= Central Field, Giza =

Area of archaeological interest

The Central Field is an area of the Giza pyramid complex located to the east of Khafre's causeway and extending to the pyramid town of Queen Khentkaus I. It is the site of some large stone quarries that provided the stones for the construction of the first two pyramids built at Giza (the Great Pyramid and the Pyramid of Khafre). Hence the tombs there date to the later part of the Fourth Dynasty and later. The tombs from the 4th Dynasty include those of queens Persenet, Khamerernebty II, Rekhetre, Khentkaus I and Bunefer, as well as several royal sons.

The Central Field area was originally excavated and documented by Selim Hassan in the period from 1929 to 1939.

== 4th Dynasty tombs ==
The tombs form the 4th Dynasty include several royal wives, sons and daughters.

Tomb number	Type	Name of owner	Title owner	Time Period	Comments
G 8080; LG 92	Mastaba and rock-cut	Iuenmin	Eldest king's son of his body, chief justice and vizier, treasurer of the King of Lower Egypt, etc.	End of Dynasty 4	Wife: Khamerernebty
G 8090; LG 90	Rock-cut tomb	Debehen	Sole companion, secretary of the House of Morning, keeper of the headdress, adorner of Horus, director of the palace, etc.	4th Dynasty (Menkaure)	
G 8140	Rock-cut tomb	Niuserre	King's Son of His Body, Treasurer of the King of Lower Egypt, Sole Confidant.	4th Dynasty	Tomb contains 2 shafts and a chapel.
G 8154	Rock-cut tomb	Sekhemkare	Eldest King's Son of His Body, Treasurer of the King of Lower Egypt, Director of the Palace, Director of the Scribes of the Book of His Father, etc.	4th Dynasty (Khafre) to early 5th Dynasty	Son of Queen Hekenuhedjet and Khafre, the partial name of his wife was preserved as Khufu[..]t; Sons: Sekhemkare, Saf-Khafre, Herkhaf, and Khafre-ankh
G 8156	Rock-cut tomb	Persenet	King's beloved wife, king's daughter of his body, etc.	4th Dynasty (Khafre)	Possibly daughter of Khufu and wife of Khafre.
G 8158	Rock-cut tomb	Nikaure	King's eldest son of his body, chief justice and vizier	4th Dynasty (Khafre) and later	Possibly a son of Queen Persenet and King Khafre
G 8172	Rock-cut tomb	Nebemakhet	King's Eldest Son and Chief Justice and Vizier	4th Dynasty: Khafre to Menkaure or later	Son of Khafre and Queen Meresankh III. Nebemakhet's wife Nubhetep and several brothers and a sister are mentioned.
G 8210	Rock-cut tomb	Irsekhu	Captain of the two Divine Boats, Overseer of the Army, Overseer of the Tutors of the King's Children of His Body, etc.	Late 4th Dynasty	
G 8260	Stone Mastaba	Babaef	King's Son, Director of the Palace, etc.	Middle to end of 4th Dynasty	
G 8400; LG 100	Burial complex	Khentkaus I	Mother of the two kings of Upper and Lower Egypt (or king of Upper and Lower Egypt, mother of the king of Upper and Lower Egypt), daughter of the god	End of 4th to early 5th Dynasty	The complex includes a pyramid, a solar boat, a valley temple, a washing tent, a house of embalming, a libation tank, and a mud-brick pyramid town.
G 8408	Rock-cut tomb	Bunefer	King's wife, great one of the hetes-sceptre, priestess of Shepses-Nebty (Shepseskaf), seer of Horus and Seth, king's daughter of (his body), etc.	End of 4th to 5th Dynasty	
G 8460	Rock-cut tomb	Ankhmare	Eldest King's son of his body, chief justice and vizier, etc.	End of 4th Dynasty	
G 8464	Rock-cut tomb	Hemetre	King's daughter of his body, priestess of Hathor	Mid to end 4th Dynasty or early 5th dynasty	Several children of Hemetre are depicted in her tomb.
G 8466	Rock-cut tomb	Iunre	the King of Upper and Lower Egypt, Khafre, His Eldest Son of His Body, director of the palace, etc.	End of 4th Dynasty	Son of Khafre.
G 8496	Stone Mastaba	Sekhemka	The Overseer of the Army (General), The Divine Treasurer (Boat-captain), etc.	End of 4th Dynasty or later	A son named Iufi and two daughters named Iynefert and Meritefes are named.
G 8530	Stone Mastaba	Rekhetre	King's Daughter of His Body, King's Wife, etc.	Late 4th Dynasty	Daughter of King Khafre, possibly wife of King Menkaure.
G 8976	Rock-cut tomb	Washptah	Overseer of craftsmen of the wabet, priest of Ptah, priest of Sokar, priest of Khufu, etc.	End of 4th to 5th dynasty	Queen Khamerernebty II is mentioned on the entrance lintel. Washptah's wife Wemtetka and several children are attested in the tomb.
G 8978; Galarza Tomb	Rock-cut tomb	Khamerernebty II	King's daughter of his body, king's wife, seer of Horus and Seth	Middle to end 4th Dynasty	The tomb may have been started for Khamerernebty II's mother Khamerernebty I, but the tomb was completed for the daughter. Khamerernebty II was likely a daughter of King Khafre and a wife of Menkaure.
G 8980	Stone Mastaba	Wetetj-hetep	Royal acquaintance	Late 4th or early 5th Dynasty	
