= Pyramid G2-a =

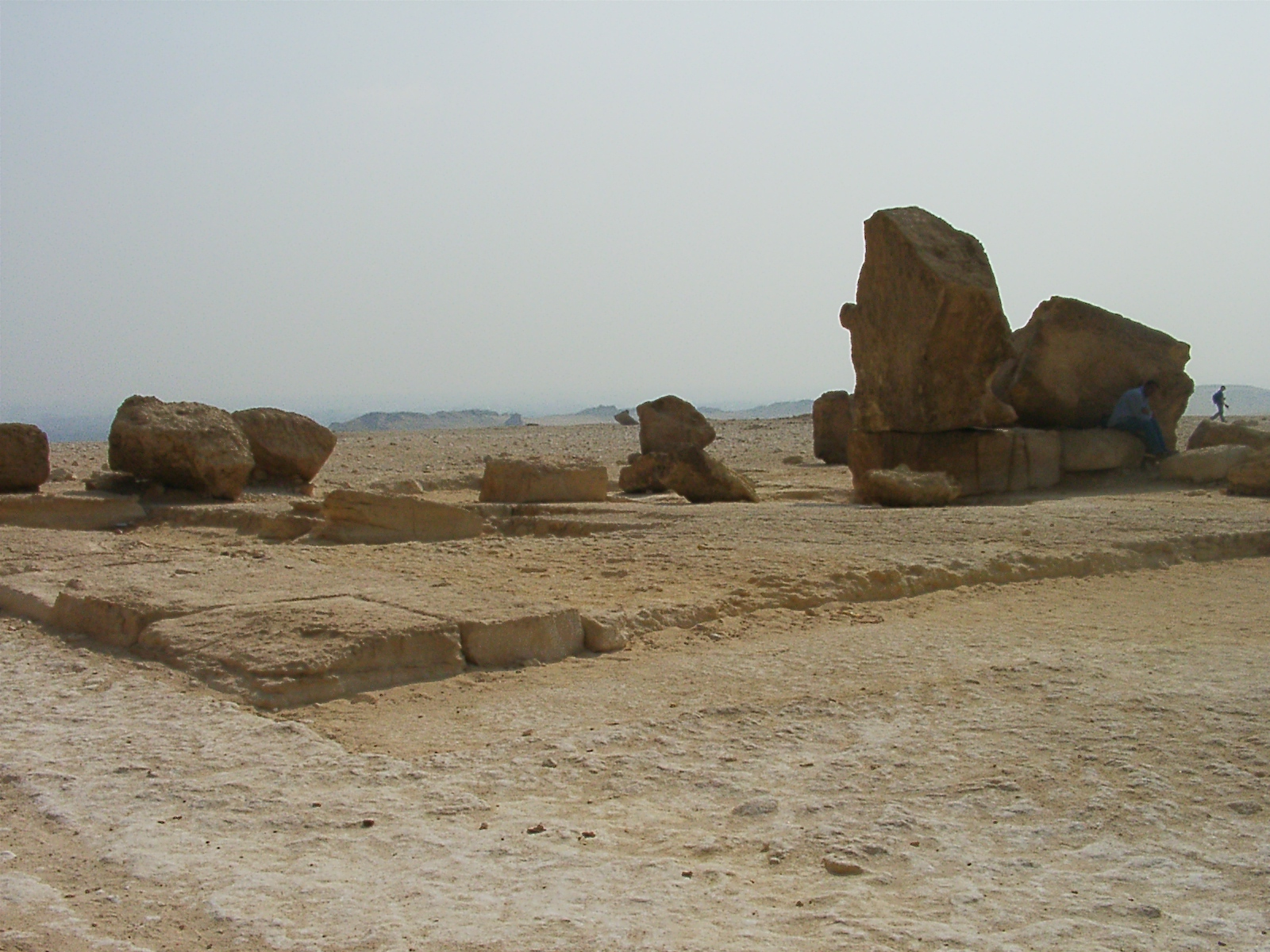
- The destroyed foundations of Pyramid G2-a, along with a few core blocks, 2004

Khafre
- Coordinates: 29°58′29″N 31°07′52″E
- Constructed: Built c. 2550 BC; Destroyed c. 1180
- Type: Satellite pyramid

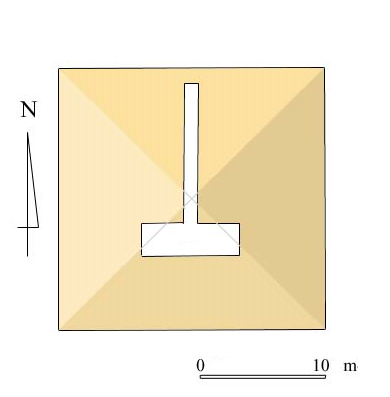
A diagram of the pyramid's interior

Pyramid G2-a is the name of the satellite pyramid of Khafre located in the Giza pyramid complex. The structure was built south of the main pyramid along its centerline, and likely contained a statue dedicated to the king's ka. The structure contains two descending passages: The first opened on the north side of the pyramid and terminated in a small chamber. The second passage, discovered in 1960 by Abdel Hafez Abd el-'Al, is located four meters to the west of the ruin, ending in a niche that contained pieces of ritualistic furniture.

The pyramid was likely dismantled by the Emir Karakoush of the Ayyubid Sultanate (serving in the 12th century under Saladin), who used the structure's stone for other construction projects. After centuries of exposure to the elements and further stone robbing, almost nothing remains of G2-a other than some core blocks and the outline of the foundation.

== See also ==
- List of Egyptian pyramids

== Bibliography ==
- Lehner, Mark (1997). The Complete Pyramids: Solving the Ancient Mysteries. London, UK: Thames & Hudson. ISBN 9780500050842.
- Lehner, Mark; Lacov, Peter (1985). "An enigmatic object explained" (PDF). The Journal of Egyptian Archaeology. 71: 169–174. doi:10.1177/030751338507100118. S2CID 192447364.
- Monnier, Franck (2017). L'ère des géants: Une description détaillée des grandes pyramides d'Egypte. Paris: Éditions De Boccard. ISBN 9782701804934.
