= Iunmin I =

Ancient Egyptian prince and vizier

Iunmin
- Vizier of Egypt
- Tenure: c. 2520 BC
- Burial: Giza, Giza Governorate, Egypt
- Spouse: Khamerernebti

Iunmin (also written as Yunmin, Iuenmin, Minuen; fl. c. 2520 BC) was a vizier from the Fourth Dynasty of Egypt. He was possibly a son of king Khafre. He served as vizier towards the end of the dynasty, possibly during the reign of his brother Menkaure.

== Tomb ==
The tomb of Iunmin is known as G 8080 (= LG 92), located in the Central Field which is part of the Giza Necropolis. The name of his wife Khamerernebti is recorded in the tomb. The lintel at the entrance of the tomb contains offering texts and the name and titles of Iunmin.

The tomb was excavated from the rock of the western cliff, while the chapel and facade were made of limestone. The entrance hall opens up on the right into a small antechamber which contains two uninscribed false doors. In front of the false doors are two burial shafts (1547 and 1632).

From the entrance hall, one can move further into the tomb and to the entrance to the outer chapel. To the left of the outer chapel is a passage which leads to a serdab which may have contained wooden statues in the past as traces of decayed wood was found. In the floor another shaft (1551) was dug.

From the outer chapel a door leads to the inner chapel. The inner chapel contains two pillars. To the left is a chamber with another burial shaft (1550), while to the right there is a room with an offering table. Behind the pillars is another small chamber with two more burial shafts (1549 and 1687).

=== Decoration ===
The pillared hall contains a scene showing Iunmin and his wife Khamerenebty before a table of offerings. Iunmin is called the hereditary prince, chief justice and vizier, greatest of the five in the temple of Thoth, and the King's Son Iunmin.

=== Burial shafts ===
- 1547 – The shaft opens up to a burial chamber containing a sarcophagus of white limestone. The sarcophagus was empty.
- 1632 – The shaft opens up to a burial chamber. A box was hewn out of the floor and covered with a limestone slab meant to serve as a sarcophagus lid. The chamber was empty.
- 1550 – The shaft opens up to a burial chamber with the box of a sarcophagus dug out of the floor. The earth in the shaft contained decomposed bones.
- 1551 – Shaft opens up to a simple rock hewn chamber. Nothing was found.
- 1549 – Shaft opens up into a burial chamber, but nothing was found.
- 1687 – Shaft opens up to a simple rock hewn chamber. Disturbed human bones were found in this chamber.
