= Iunre =

4th Dynasty Egyptian prince

r a O28
- Burial: Mastaba LG 87 in Giza, Egypt
- Father: Khafre

Iunre or Yunre was an ancient Egyptian prince of the 4th Dynasty. He was the son of king Khafre. He was named after Ra.

== Titles ==
His titles include:

- the king of Upper and Lower Egypt, Khafre, his eldest son of his body
- chief ritualist of his father, scribe of the god's book of his father, sole confidant of his father
- director of the palace
- guardian of the secrets of the house of the horning
- priest of the souls of Nekhen ..., high priest
- overseer of all the works
- honored by his father, secretary of his father, he who is in [the heart] of his father

== Tomb ==
Iunre's tomb is G 8466, located in the Central Field which is part of the Giza Necropolis. The tomb is rockcut and the courtyard contains a life-size statue of a man. The courtyard also contains a shaft. An entrance leads one from the courtyard to the chapel which consists of just one rock cut room. Another burial shaft is located in the corner of this chapel. This shaft leads into a burial chamber. A large number of bodies were found in the burial chamber.
