= Hemetre =

Egyptian royal woman

Hemetre in hieroglyphs
r a Hm t
Hemetre
Ḥm.t-Rꜥ

Hemetre (Hemetra) was an ancient Egyptian royal woman of the Fourth Dynasty. Hemetre may have been a daughter or granddaughter of Khafre. She did not hold the title king's wife and may have even married a non-royal. She is mainly known from her tomb, which is located in the central field of Giza. Her name honors the god Ra.

== Titles ==
Hemetre was a King's daughter of his body and thus a daughter of one of the kings of the Fourth dynasty of Egypt. Hemetre was also a priestess of the goddess Hathor. One inscription mentions that she is "an honored one by the great god" and "she who does what her father likes every day".

== Family ==
The location of her tomb (Central Field in Giza) suggests that she may be a daughter of Khafre. His name is attested in her tomb. Hassan suggests she may be a daughter or granddaughter of Khafre, but may have been married to a commoner. Hemetre is never called a King's wife in her tomb.

Several children of Hemetre are depicted in her tomb. Included are her sons Shepseska(u), Akhetre and Shepsesre(-sheri), and her daughters Hetepheres, Khentkaus, and Meresankh. Hemetre is depicted with her sons and daughters on one of the pillars in the chapel. Hemetre is faced by her sons Akh(et)re and Shepsesre-sheri in one register, while her daughters Hetepheres and Meresankh are depicted below their brothers. Her daughter Khentkaues is shown behind her mother. All five children appear as adults in this scene.

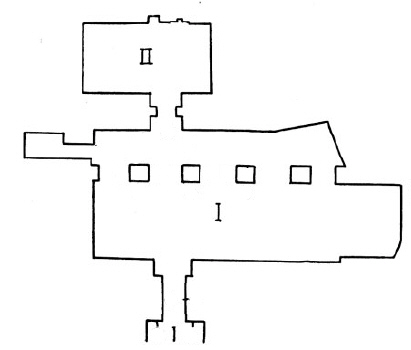
The tomb of Hemetre

== Tomb ==
Hemetre's tomb (G 8464) is located in the Central Field which is part of the Giza Necropolis. The entrance of the tomb leads to a pillared hall. The hall contains a large burial chamber as well as two smaller shafts. Off the chapel is another smaller chapel, again containing a burial shaft. Scenes in the tomb include offering bearers representing offerings from royal estates. These are all related to Khafre.

In the passageway of the tomb the upper part of a false door belonging to the Royal chamberlain Nebsen was found. One of the offering bearers shown in the tomb is named Senebuka. This official was buried nearby.
