= Ankhmare =

Egyptian prince and vizier

- Vizier of Egypt
Egyptian name
r a S34 m&a
- Tenure: c. 2525 BC
- Pharaoh: Menkaure
- Burial: Giza, Giza Governorate, Egypt
- Father: Khafre

Ankhmare (fl. c. 2525 BC) was an ancient Egyptian prince and vizier of the 4th Dynasty. His titles include king's eldest son of his body (sA-nswt n Xt=f), as well as chief justice and vizier (smsw tAjtj sAb TAtj). Ankhmare was a son of King Khafre and was named after the god Ra.

== Titles ==
His titles include:

- Hereditary prince, count, the eldest King's son of his body
- Chief Ritualist of His Father
- Chief justice and vizier
- Treasurer of his father, the King of Lower Egypt.

== Tomb ==
Ankhmare's tomb is G 8460, located in the Central Field, which is part of the Giza Necropolis. The entrance leads to a rock-cut chapel. Two pillars divide the chapel into two parts. In the area behind the pillars three burial shafts are dug into the floor.

- Shaft no 1350 contained a skeleton. Foot prints of a man and a boy were found in the area around the body. These presumably belonged to the grave robbers who violated the burial chamber in antiquity.
- Shaft no 1351 was a simple pit.
- Shaft no 1352 contained a limestone sarcophagus which was placed against the west wall.
