= Khafre Enthroned =

Funerary statue

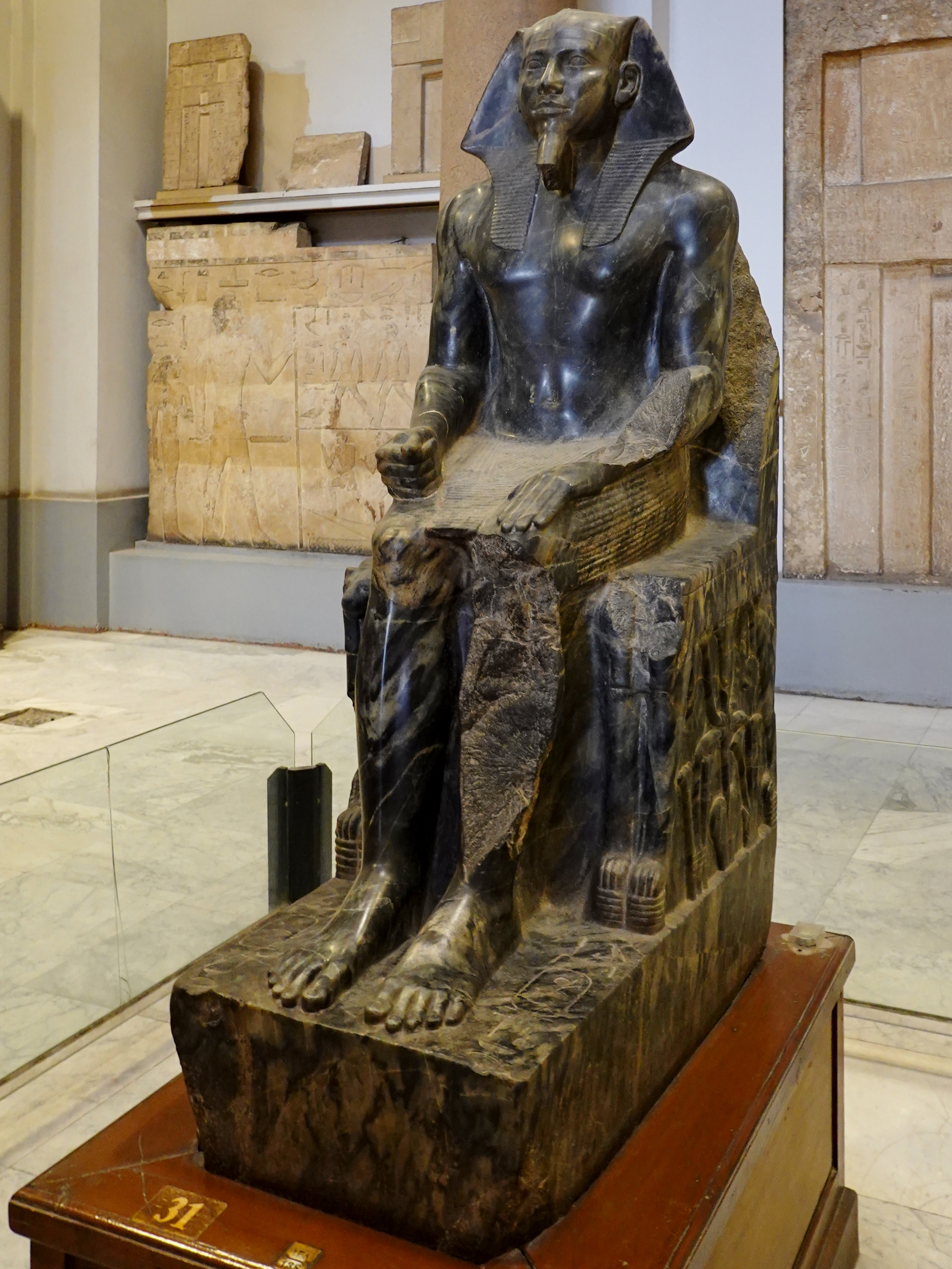
- Statue on display in the French National Museum of Prehistory in a 2019 exhibition
- Material: Anorthosite gneiss
- Height: 1.68 meters
- Created: c. 2550 BC
- Discovered: 1860; Giza, Giza Governorate, Egypt
- Discovered by: Auguste Mariette
- Present location: Egyptian Museum, Cairo, Cairo Governorate, Egypt
- Registration: CG 14

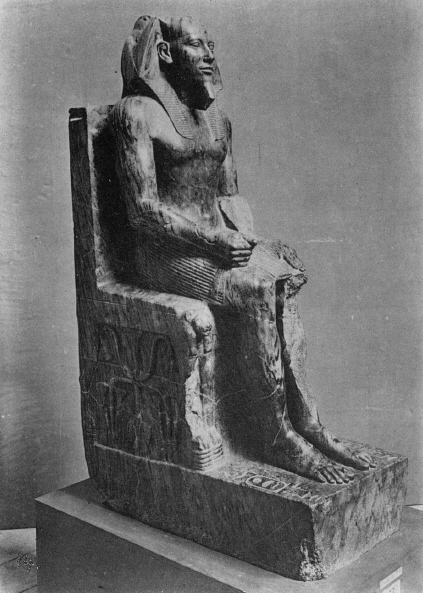
Khafre Enthroned, as photographed in 1911.

Khafre Enthroned is a Ka statue of the pharaoh Khafre, who reigned during the Fourth Dynasty of ancient Egypt. It is now located in the Egyptian Museum in Cairo. Made of anorthosite gneiss, a valuable, extremely hard, and dark stone, it was brought 1,000 km (620 mi) down the Nile River from the "Khafre quarries" west of Gebel el-Asr. The statue was carved for the Pharaoh's valley temple near the Great Sphinx, a part of the necropolis used in funeral rituals.

This sculpture, depicted in-the-round (versus relief sculpture), shows Khafre seated, one of the basic formulaic types used during the Old Kingdom to show the human figure. Mummification played a huge role in the Egyptian culture, a 70-day process to ensure immortality for the king. Starting in the 3rd millennium BCE, if the king's mummy was damaged, a ka statue was created to "ensure immortality and permanence of the deceased's identity by providing a substitute dwelling place for the ka".

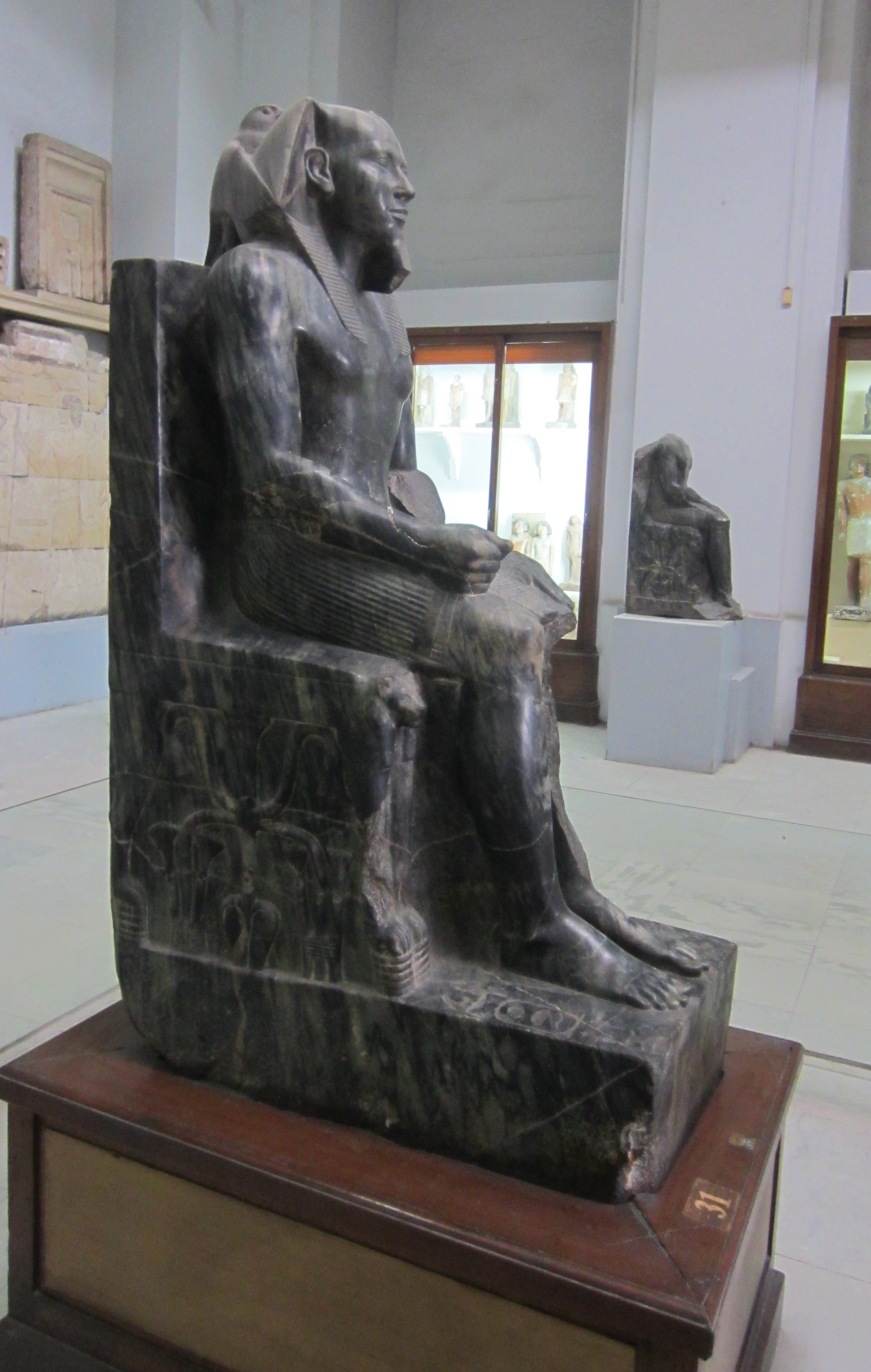
The same statue, currently located at the Egyptian Museum in Cairo, as photographed from a similar angle in 2015.

Khafre rigidly sits on his royal throne, gazing off into the distance. The pharaoh wears a linen nemes headdress, which covers most of his forehead and folds over his broad shoulders. He also wears the royal false beard attached at the end of his chiseled chin. Khafre wears a kilt covering his waist, revealing his idealized upper body and muscle definition. The Egyptian idealized portraiture is not meant to record individualized features, but instead proclaim the divine nature of Egyptian kingship. Two stylized lions' bodies form the throne Khafre sits on, creating a sturdy base. Lotus plants (symbolic of Upper Egypt) and papyrus plants (symbolic of Lower Egypt) grow between the legs of the throne, referring to the unification of Upper and Lower Egypt which ended the Egyptian predynastic period. The god Horus, depicted as a falcon, protects the backside of Khafre's head with his wings, another reference to the united Egypt. Besides the striking view of the falcon (unseen from the front) resting behind Khafre's head, Khafre's feet are emplaced upon a flat platform, engraved with nine archery bows, representing the king's and kingdom's dominance over foreign/domestic enemy tribes, the nine bows.

The symmetrical king shows no movement or change, suppressing all motion and time to create an eternal stillness; his strong build and permanent stance demonstrate no notion of time—Khafre is timeless, and his power will exist even in the afterlife. The statue is based upon compactness and solidity with few projecting parts; Khafre's block-like body is attached to the throne to last for eternity, creating one single structure. His arms rest on his thighs, directly facing the viewer in a rigid, frontal pose. The bilaterally symmetric statue, symbolizing order and control in the pharaoh, is the same on either side of the vertical axis of the statue, only differing in Khafre's clenched right fist. The tight profile and block-like aspect represent Khafre as a permanent being and part of the stone to keep his ka safe. Khafre will always exist, on earth and in the afterlife. The pharaoh's sculpture can be described as absolutely frontal, utterly immobile, and perfectly calm: the characteristics of Egyptian block statue.

The diorite statue stands at a final height of five foot six.
