= Khafre =

Ancient Egyptian pharaoh of 4th dynasty

- Khefren, Suphis II, Saophis
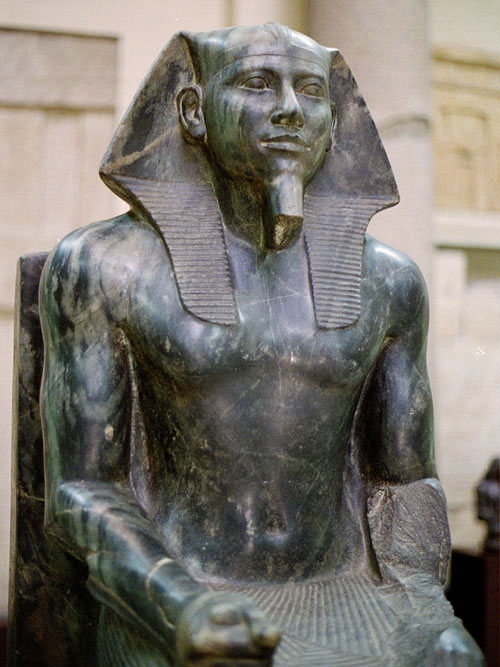
- Khafre Enthroned, a funerary statue of Khafre in diorite. Egyptian Museum in Cairo

Pharaoh
- Reign: Around 25 years, c. 2558 – c. 2532 BC
- Predecessor: Djedefre
- Successor: Bikheris (?), Menkaure
Royal titulary
Horus name
Hor-User-ib
Wsr-jb
Strong heart of Horus
G5	F12 F34
Nebty name
User-im-nebti
Wsr-m-nb.tj
Strong for the Two Ladies
G16	F12 G17
Golden Horus
Netjer-nub-sekhem
Nṯr-nb.w-sḫm
Powerful golden falcon
S42 G7 S12
Prenomen
Khafre
Ḫꜥ.f-Rꜥ
He appears like Ra
< N5 N28 f >
Other variations:
Abydos King List
Khafre
Ḫꜥ.f-Rꜥ
He appears like Ra
< N5 N28 D36 f >
Saqqara Tablet
Khafre
Ḫꜥw.f-Rꜥ
He appears like Ra
< N5 N28 G43 f >
- Consorts: Meresankh III, Khamerernebty I, and Hekenuhedjet
- Children: Nebemakhet, Duaenre, Niuserre, Khentetka, Shepsetkau, Sekhemkare, Menkaure, Khamerernebty II, Ankhmare, Akhre, Iunmin, Iunre, and Rekhetre
- Father: Khufu
- Mother: Meritites I or Henutsen
- Died: c. 2532 BC
- Burial: Pyramid of Khafre
- Monuments: Pyramid of Khafre; Great Sphinx of Giza
- Dynasty: 4th Dynasty

Khafre (Note: /ˈkæfreɪ, ˈkɑːfreɪ/ KA(H)F-ray) or Khafra (Ancient Egyptian: ḫꜥ.f-rꜥ, lit. 'He appears as Ra') or Chephren (Note: also known as Khephren /ˈkɛfrən/ KEF-rən; Ancient Greek: Χεφρῆν, romanized: Chephrên) (died c. 2532 BC) was an ancient Egyptian monarch who was the fourth king of the Fourth Dynasty, during the earlier half of the Old Kingdom period (c. 2700–2200 BC). He was son of the king Khufu, and succeeded his brother Djedefre to the throne.

Khafre's enormous pyramid at Giza, the Pyramid of Khafre, is surpassed only by his father's (the Great Pyramid). The Great Sphinx of Giza was also built for him, according to some Egyptologists, although this remains unconfirmed. Little is known about Khafre aside from the reports of Herodotus, a Greek historian who wrote 2,000 years later.

== Family ==
Khafre was a son of king Khufu and the brother and successor of Djedefre. Khafre is thought by some to be the son of Queen Meritites I due to an inscription where he is said to honor her memory.

Kings-wife, his beloved, devoted to Horus, Mertitytes.
King's-wife, his beloved, Mertitytes; beloved of the Favorite of
the Two Goddesses; she who says anything whatsoever and it is done
for her. Great in the favor of Snefr[u]; great in the favor
of Khuf[u], devoted to Horus, honored under Khafre. Merti[tyt]es.

[Breasted; Ancient Records]

Others argue that the inscription just suggests that this queen died during the reign of Khafre. Khafre may be a son of Queen Henutsen instead.

Khafre had several wives and he had at least 12 sons and 3 or 4 daughters.

=== Children with Meresankh III ===
Queen Meresankh III was the daughter of Kawab and Hetepheres II and thus a niece of Khafre.

- Nebemakhet
- Duaenre
- Niuserre
- Khentetka
- Shepsetkau

=== Children with Hekenuhedjet ===
- Sekhemkare

=== Possible children with Khamerernebty I ===
- Menkaure
- Khamerernebty II

Persenet may have been a wife of Khafre based on the location of her tomb. She was the mother of Nikaure.

Other children of Khafre are known, but no mothers have been identified. Further sons include Ankhmare, Akhre, Iunmin, and Iunre. A daughter named Rekhetre is known and Hemetre may have been a daughter or granddaughter as well.

== Reign ==
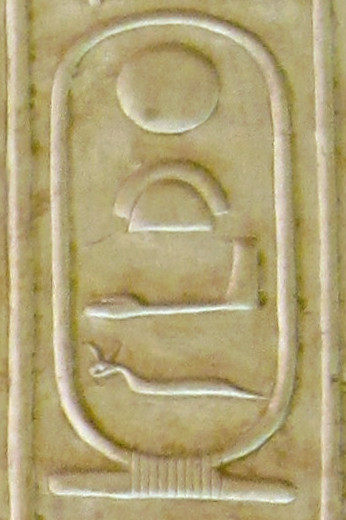
Cartouche name Kha'afre in the Abydos King List

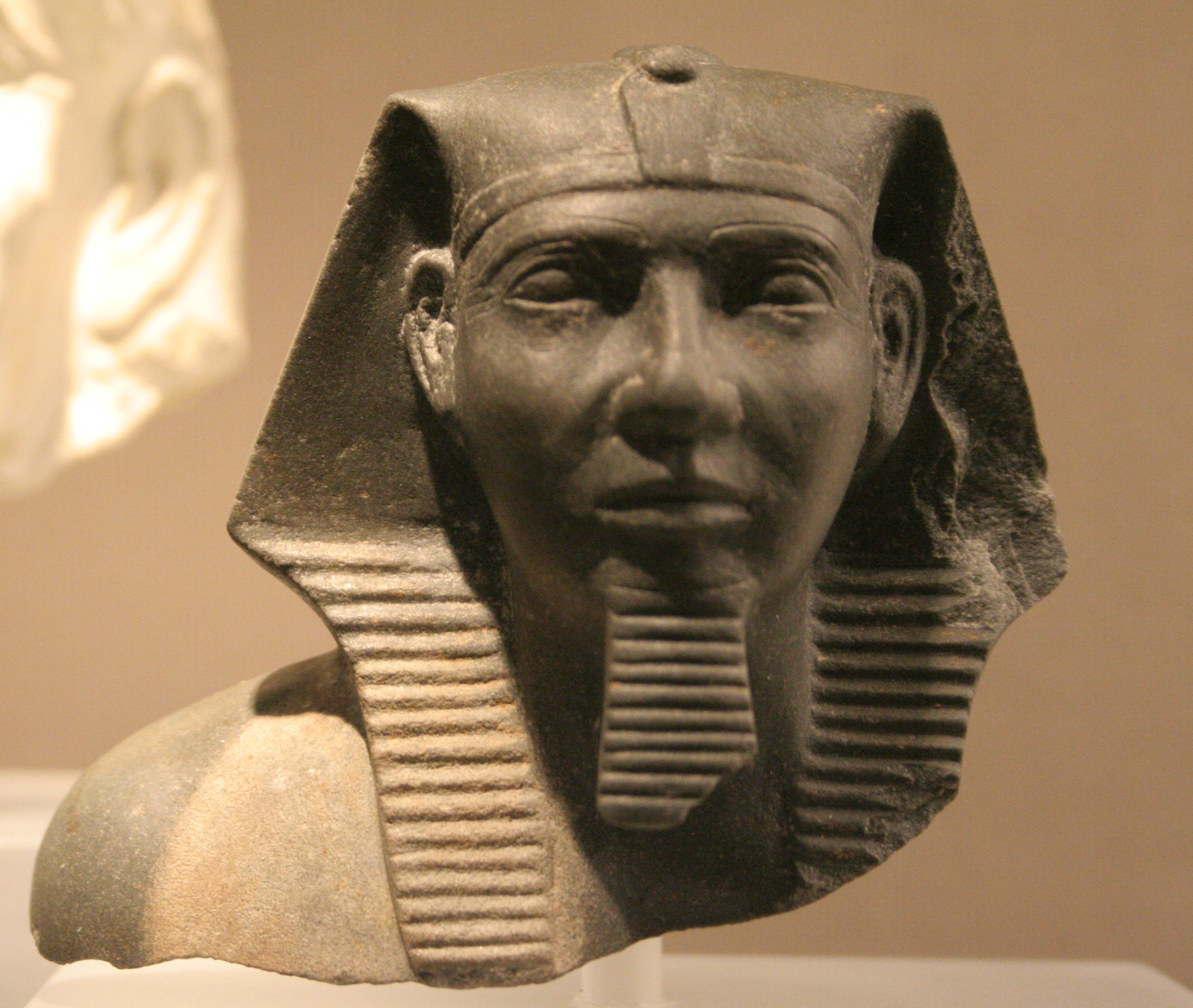
King Khafre In Ägyptisches Museum Georg Steindorff, Leipzig

There is no agreement on the date of his reign. Some authors say it was between 2558 BC and 2532 BC. While the Turin King List length for his reign is blank, and Manetho exaggerates his reign as 66 years, most scholars believe it was between 24 and 26 years, based upon the date of the Will of Prince Nekure which was carved on the walls of this Prince's mastaba tomb. The will is dated anonymously to the Year of the 12th Count and is assumed to belong to Khafre since Nekure was his son. Khafre's highest year date is the "Year of the 13th occurrence" which is a painted date on the back of a casing stone belonging to mastaba G 7650. This would imply a reign of 24–25 years for this king if the cattle count was biannual during the Fourth Dynasty.

== Pyramid complex ==
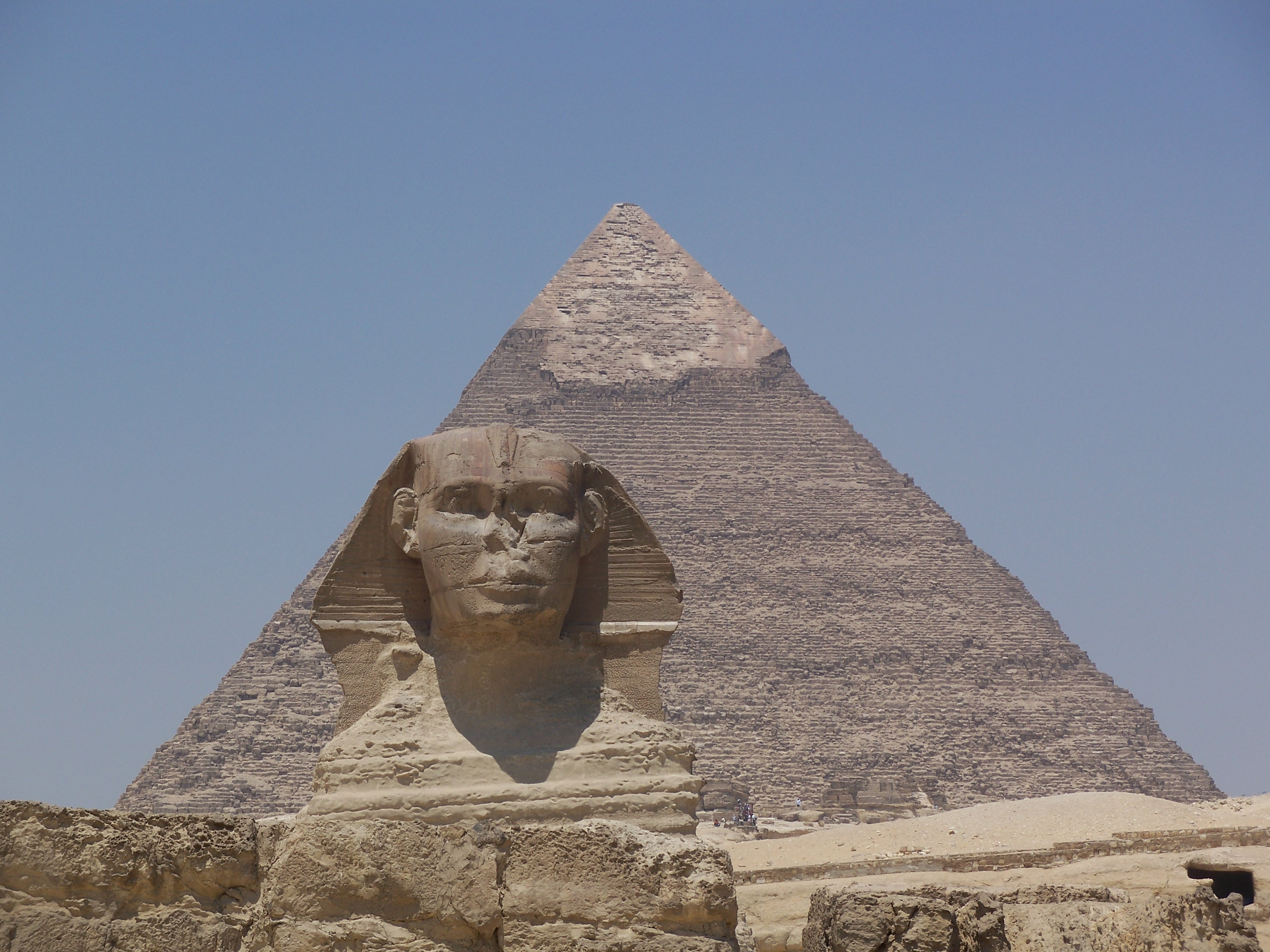
Khafre's Pyramid and the Great Sphinx in 2007

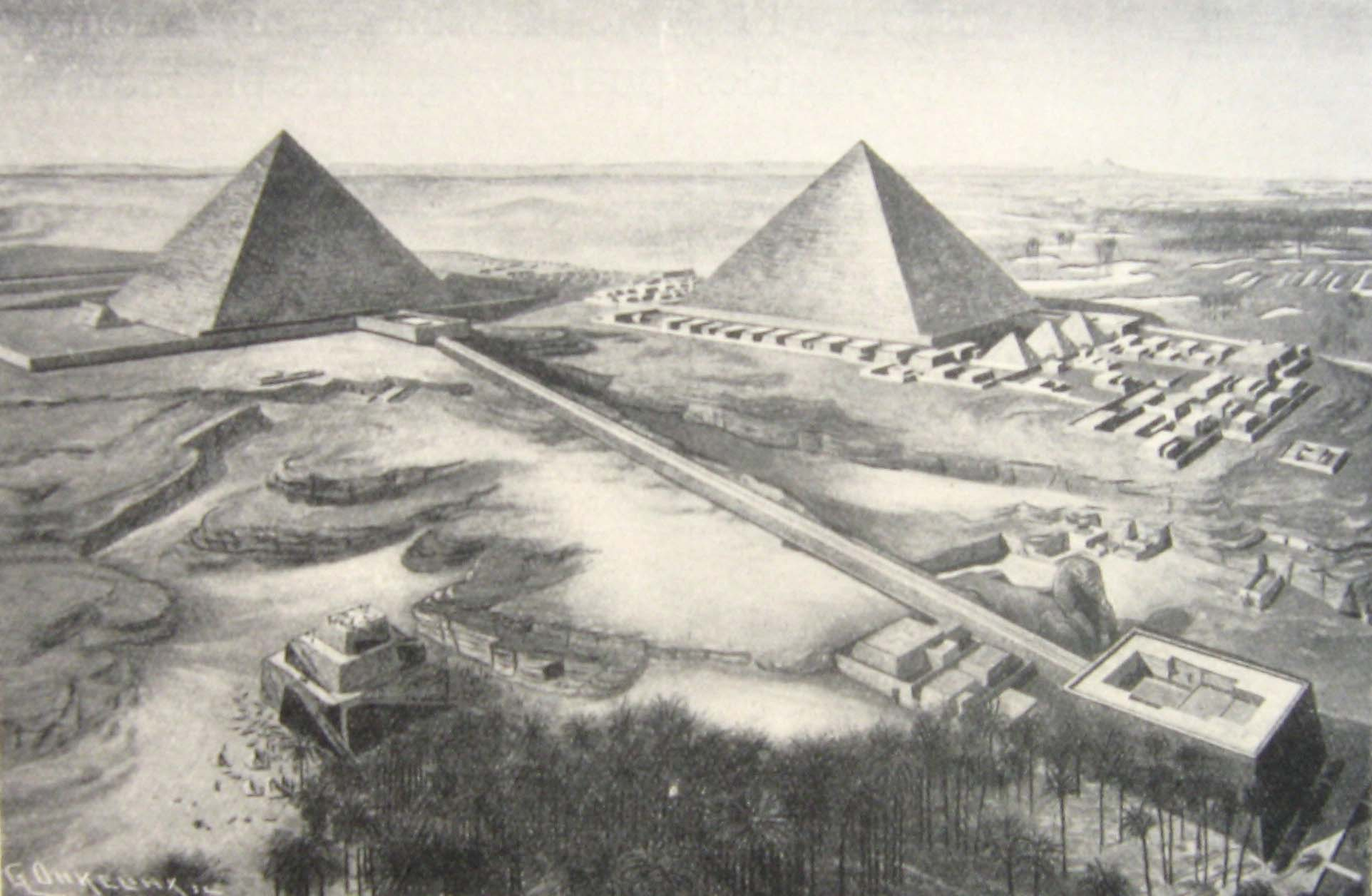
1910 Drawing of Khafre's pyramid complex. A causeway connected the Valley Temple (bottom-right) to the Pyramid Temple (top-left).

Khafre built the second-largest pyramid at Giza. The Egyptian name of the pyramid was Wer(en)-Khafre which means "Khafre is Great".

The pyramid has a subsidiary pyramid, labeled G2-a. It is not clear who was buried there. Sealings have been found of a King's eldest son of his body etc. and the Horus name of Khafre.

=== Valley Temple ===
The valley temple of Khafre was located closer to the Nile and would have stood right next to the Sphinx temple. Inscriptions from the entrance way have been found which mention Hathor and Bubastis. Blocks have been found showing the partial remains of an inscription with the Horus name of Khafre (Weser-ib). Mariette discovered statues of Khafre in 1860. Several were found in a well in the floor and were headless. But other complete statues were found as well.

=== Mortuary Temple ===
The mortuary temple was located very close to the pyramid. From the mortuary temple come fragments of maceheads inscribed with Khafre's name as well as some stone vessels.

=== Great Sphinx and Sphinx temple ===
The sphinx is said to date to the time of Khafre. This is supported by the proximity of the sphinx to Khafre's pyramid temple complex, and a certain resemblance (despite damage) to the facial structure seen in his statues. The Great Sphinx of Giza may have been carved out as a guardian of Khafre's pyramid, and as a symbol of royal power. It became deified during the time of the New Kingdom.

== Khafre in ancient Greek traditions ==
The ancient Egyptian historian Manetho called Khafre "Sûphis II". and credited him with a rulership of 66 years, but didn't make any further comments about him.

Contrary to modern Egyptologists and archaeological findings, Greek historians Diodorus and Herodotus, writing more than 2,000 years after King Khafre, depicted him as a tyrant who had followed his father Khêops on the throne. Herodotus and Diodorus say that Khafre ruled for 56 years.

They describe a king Menkaure (whom they call "Mykerînós") as the follower of Khafre and that this king was the counterpart of his two predecessors: Herodotus describes Menkaure as bringing peace and piety back to Egypt.

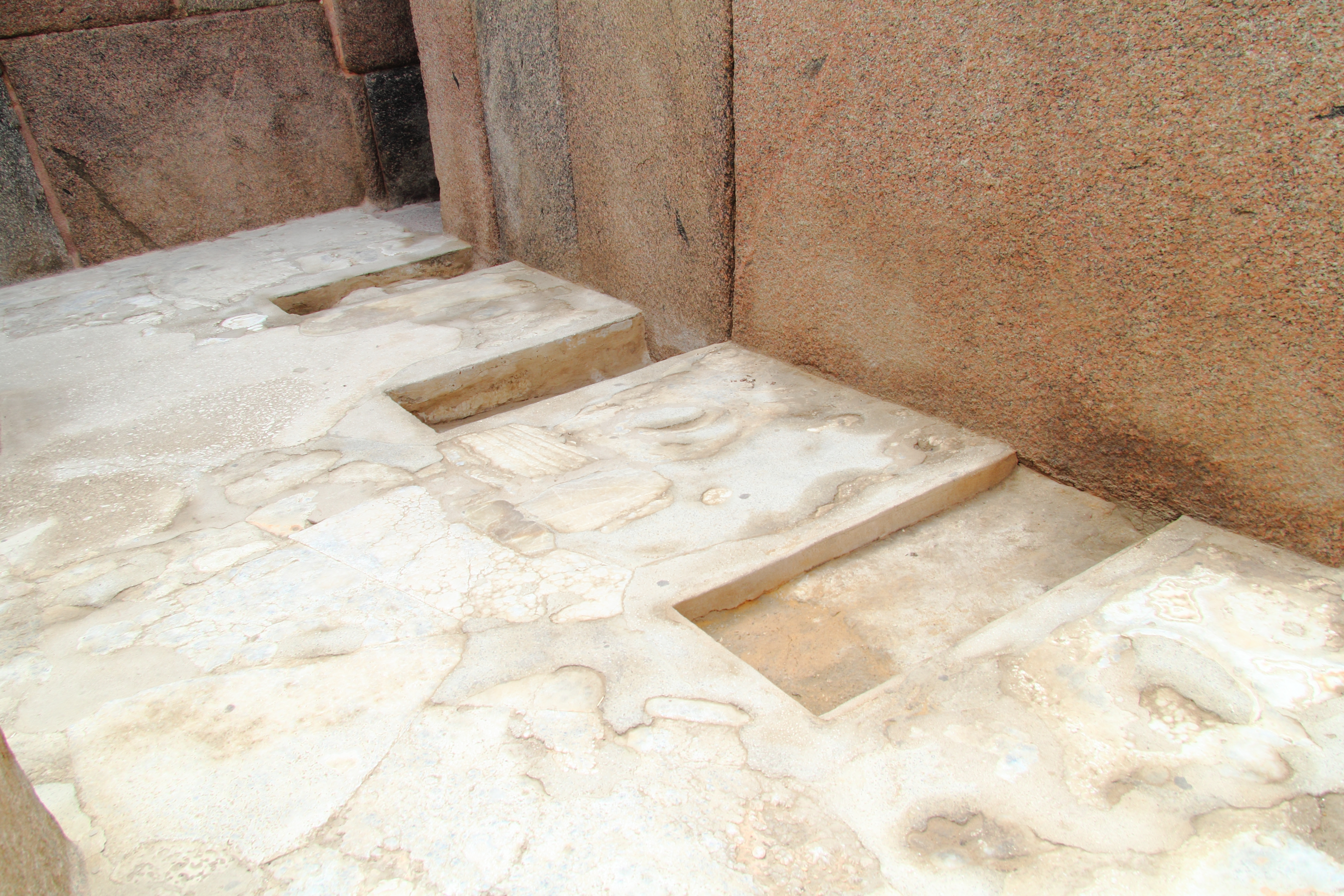
Depressions for statues in the mortuary temple of King Khafre in Giza

Of all the rulers of the Old Kingdom, Khafre is evidenced by the greatest number of statues. Almost all of them come from Giza, partly from the official necropolis there, but mainly from the area around the temple complexes of the Khafre pyramid. In a large hall of the valley temple, 23 depressions have been made in the ground, in which originally life-size statues stood. One of these depressions is wider than the others, there may have been two statues here. It has been suggested that these 24 statues are related to the hours of the day. All of these statues were removed from their location at some point after the reign of Khafre. Auguste Mariette found nine of them during excavations in 1860 (Inv.No. CG 9 to CG 17) and fragments of a tenth (CG 378) in a pit within the valley temple. These statues are now in the Egyptian Museum in Cairo.

== Gallery ==
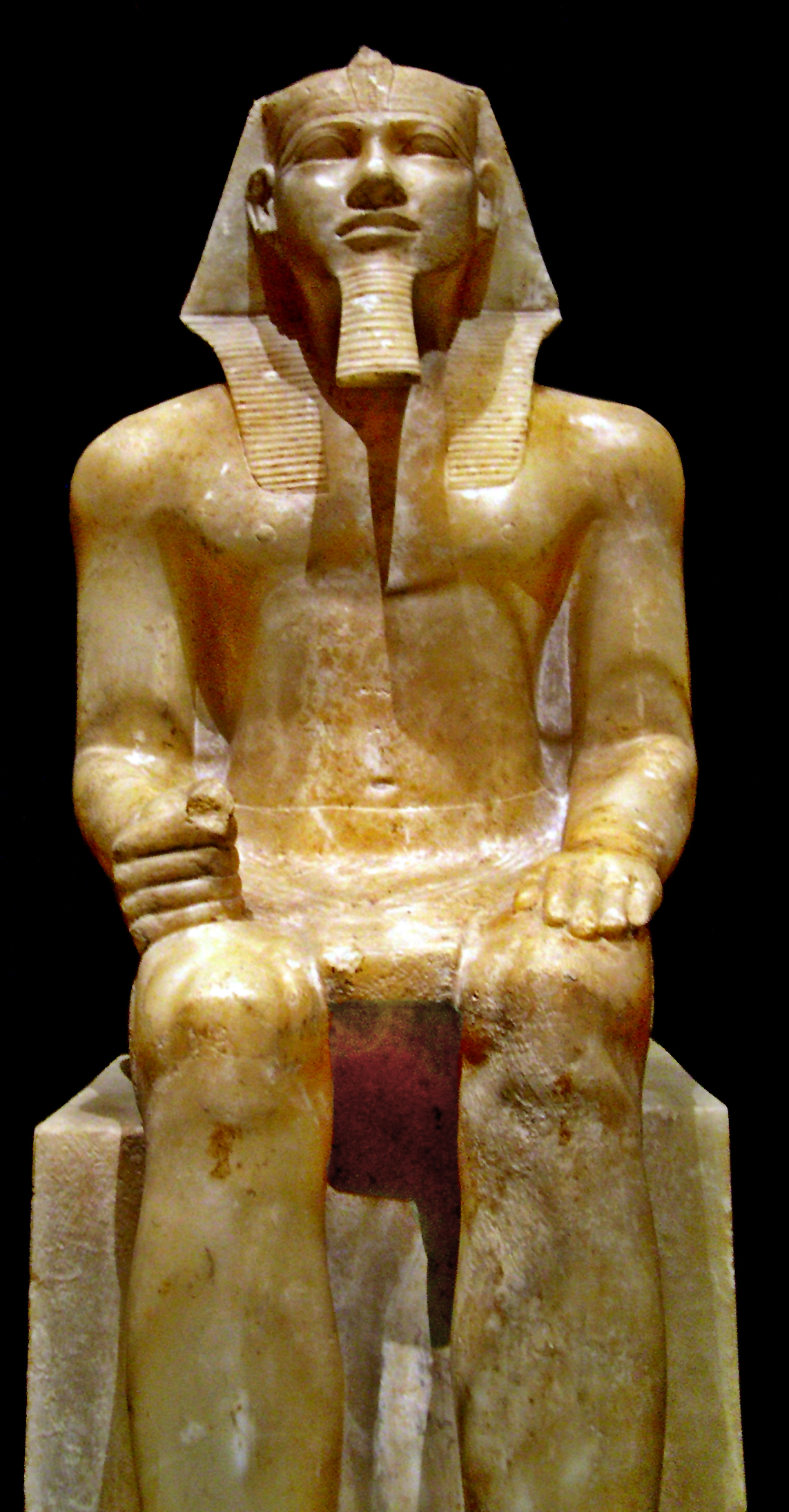
Colossal alabaster statue of Khafre in the Cairo Egyptian Museum

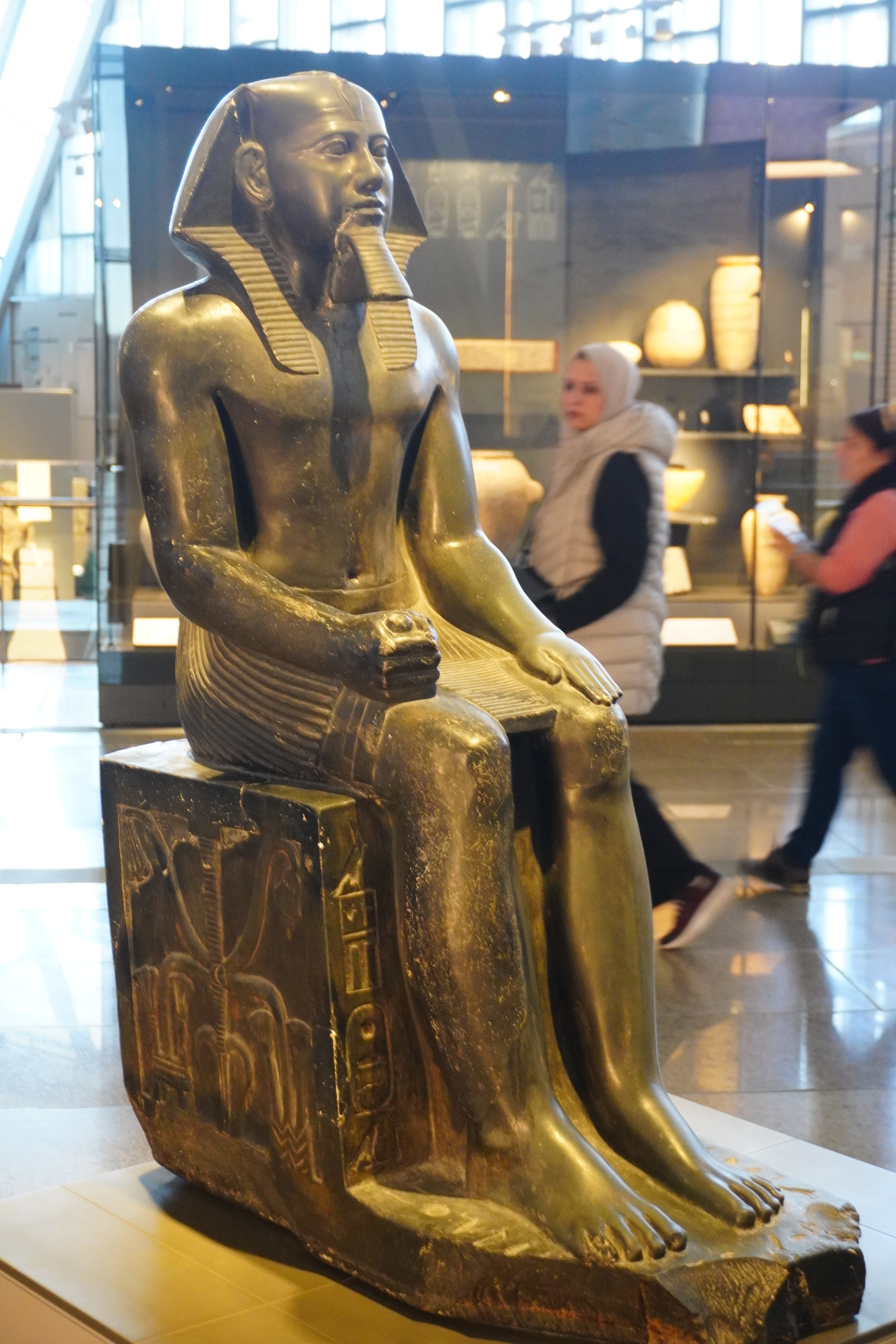
Statue of Khafre at the Grand Egyptian Museum

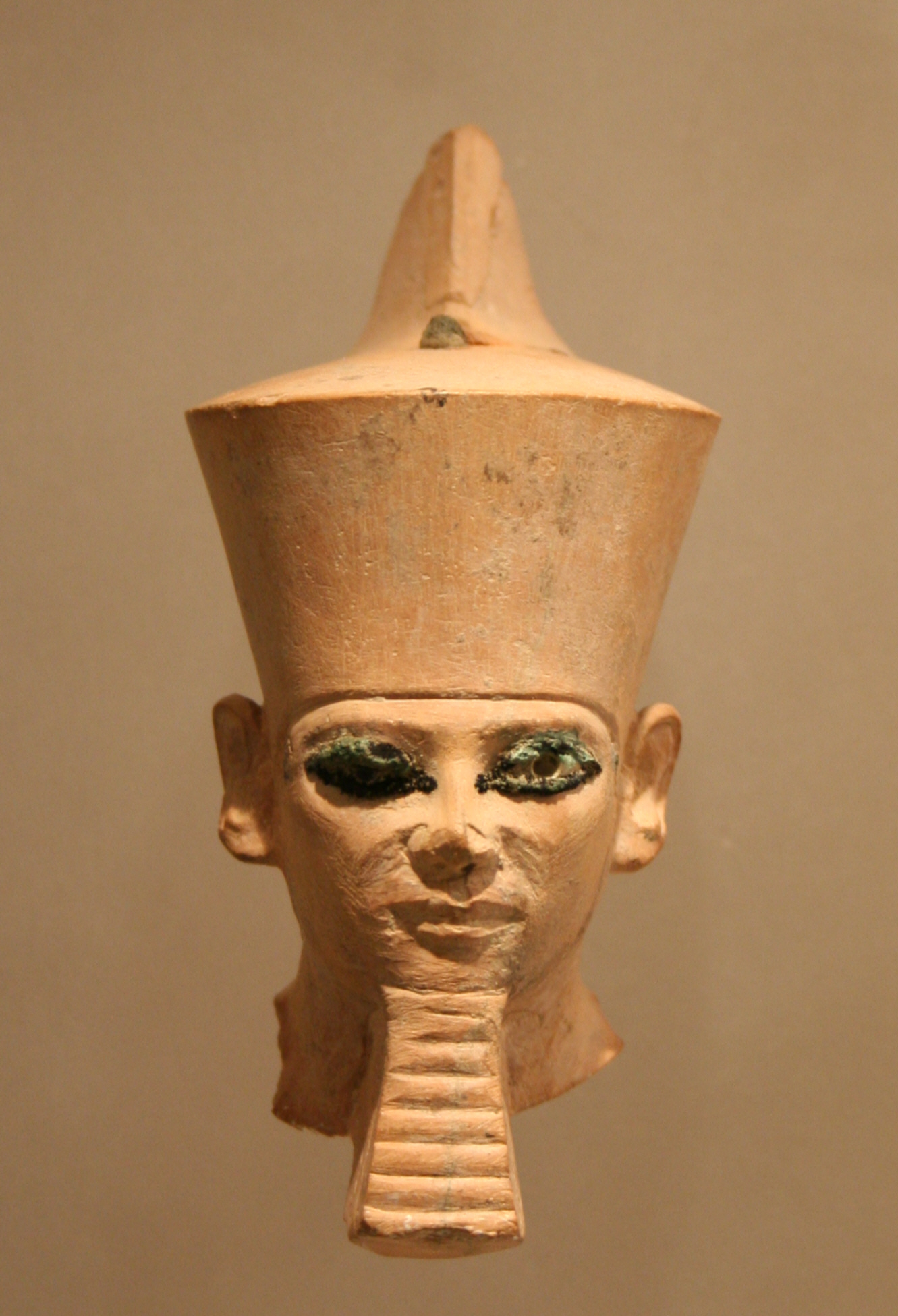
Statue head of Khafre with the Red crown (deshret) of Lower Egypt, in the Ägyptisches Museum, Leipzig

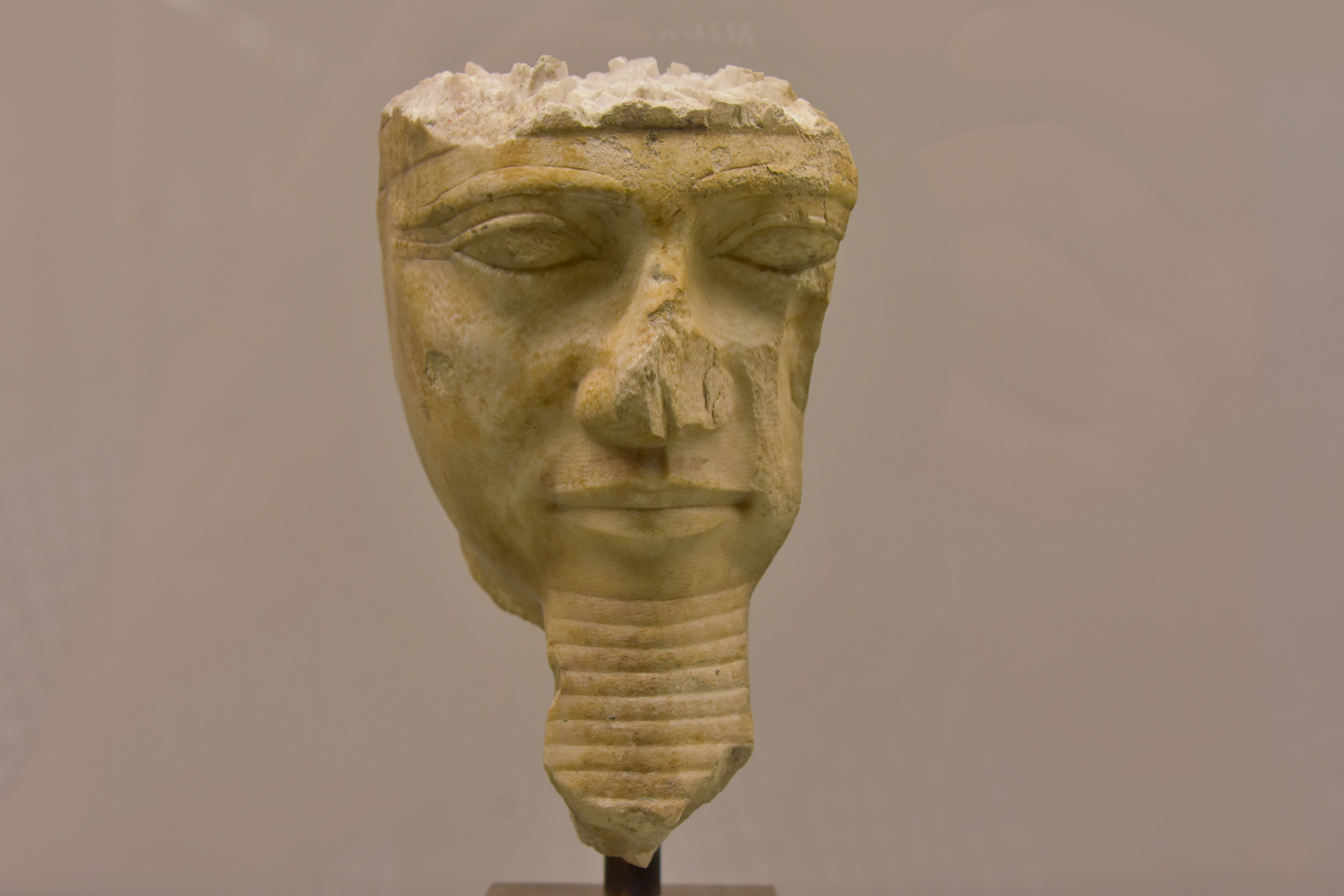
Fragment of statue of Khafre, c. 2510-2485 BCE, Ny Carlsberg Glyptotek, Copenhagen

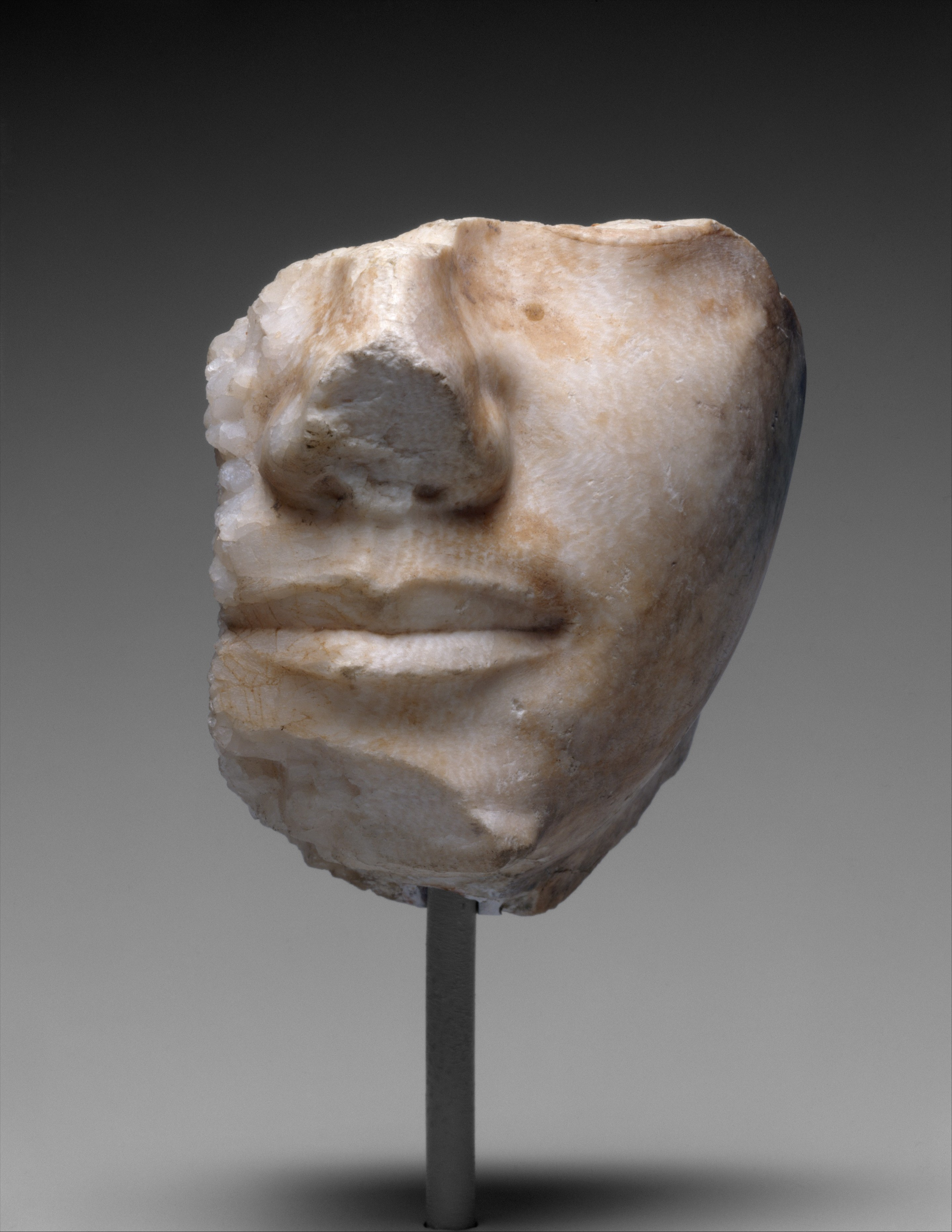
Fragment of statue of Khafre, Metropolitan Museum of Art, New York City

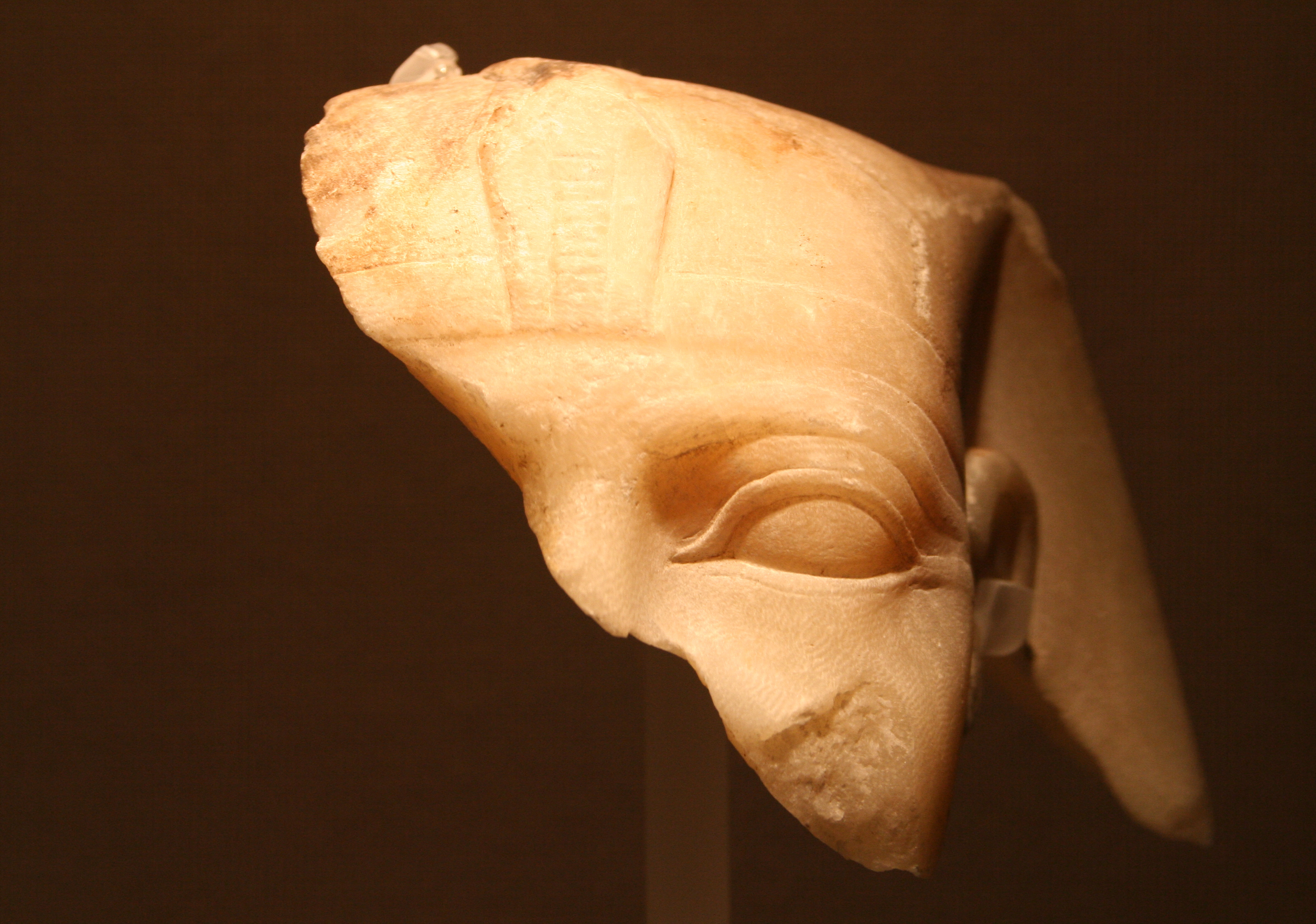
Fragment of statue of Khafre In Ägyptisches Museum, Leipzig

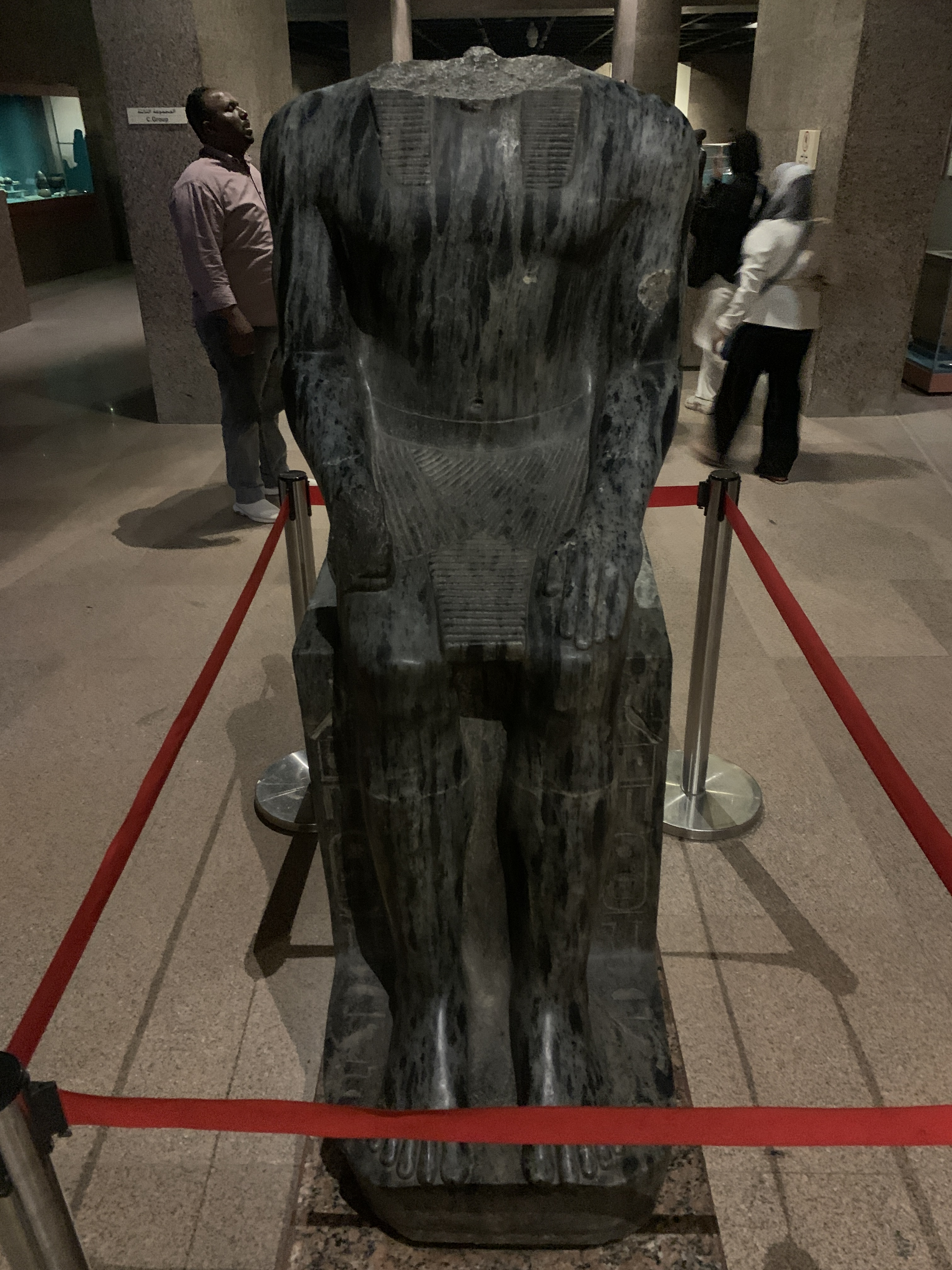
Headless statue of Khafre in the Nubian Museum, Aswan

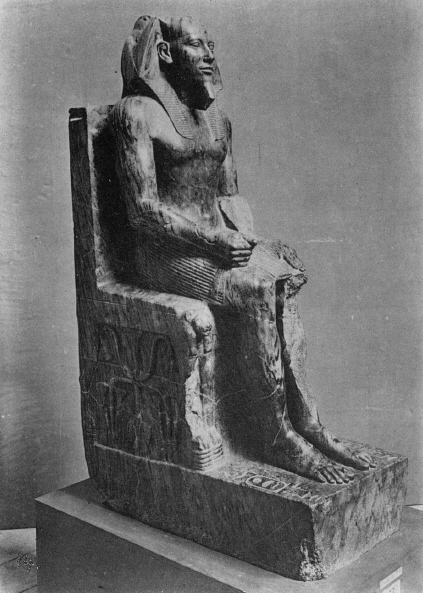
Khafre Enthroned, from his valley temple at Giza, now in the Egyptian Museum, Cairo (CG 14)

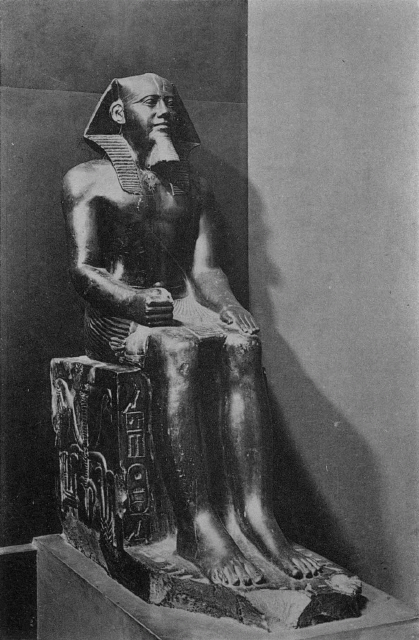
Intact statue of Khafre from his valley temple at Giza, previously in the Egyptian Museum, Cairo (CG 15); has since been relocated to the Grand Egyptian Museum

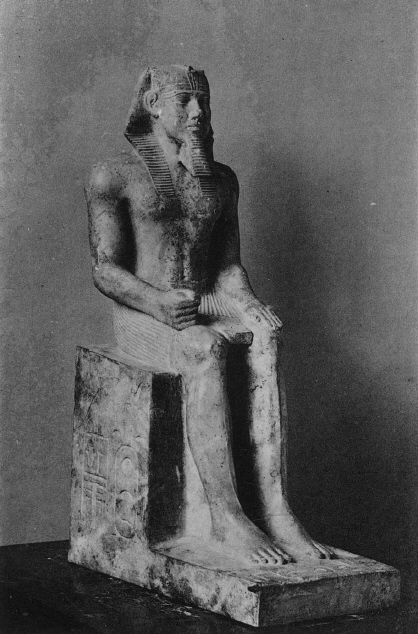
Alabaster statue of Khafre from Memphis, previously in the Egyptian Museum, Cairo (CG 41); has since been relocated to the Grand Egyptian Museum

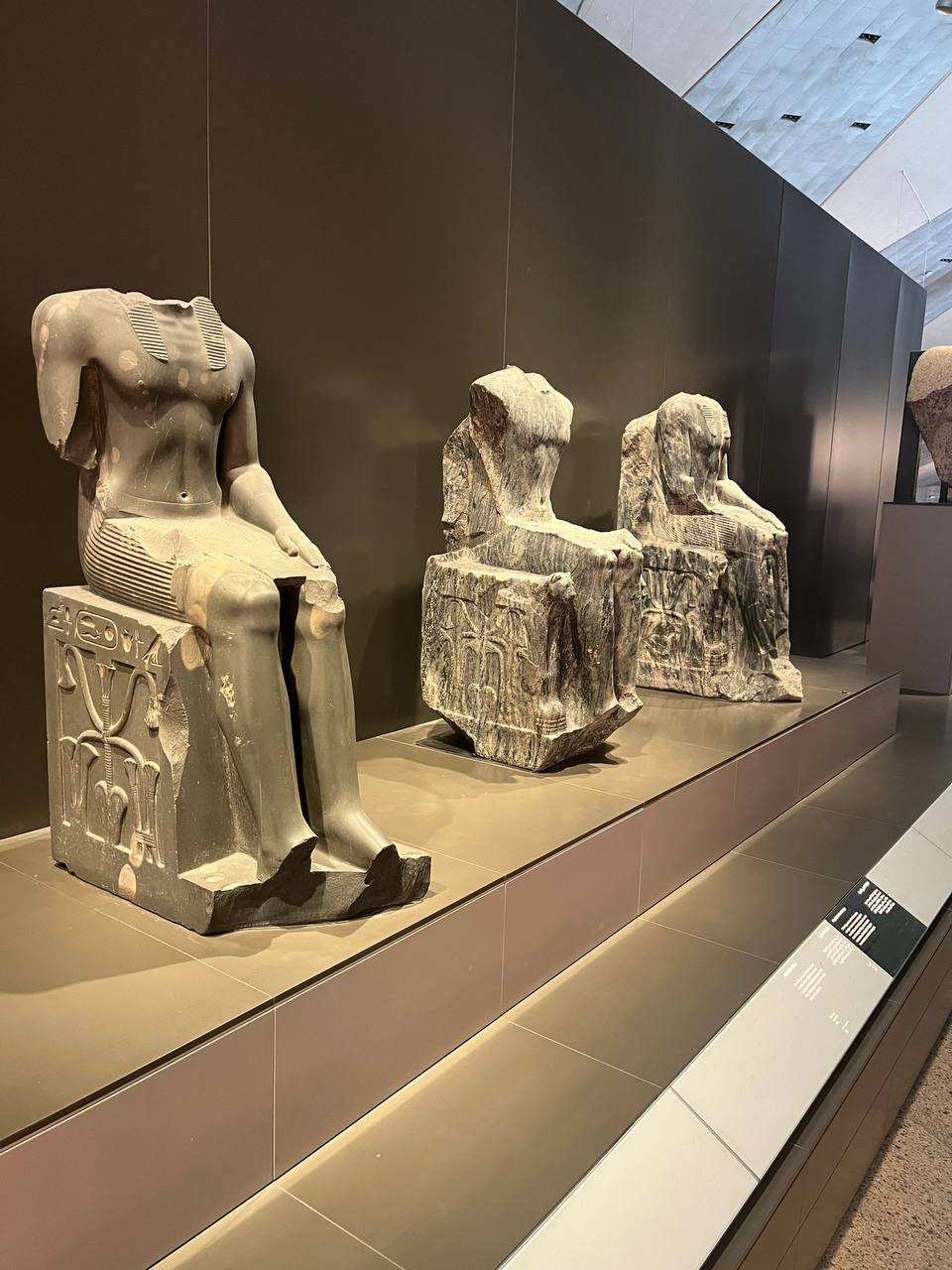
Headless statues of Khafre from his valley temple at Giza, now in the Grand Egyptian Museum

Pharaoh Khafre's sarcophagus in the burial chamber in his pyramid at Giza
