= Pyramid of Khafre =

Smooth-sided pyramid in Giza, Egypt

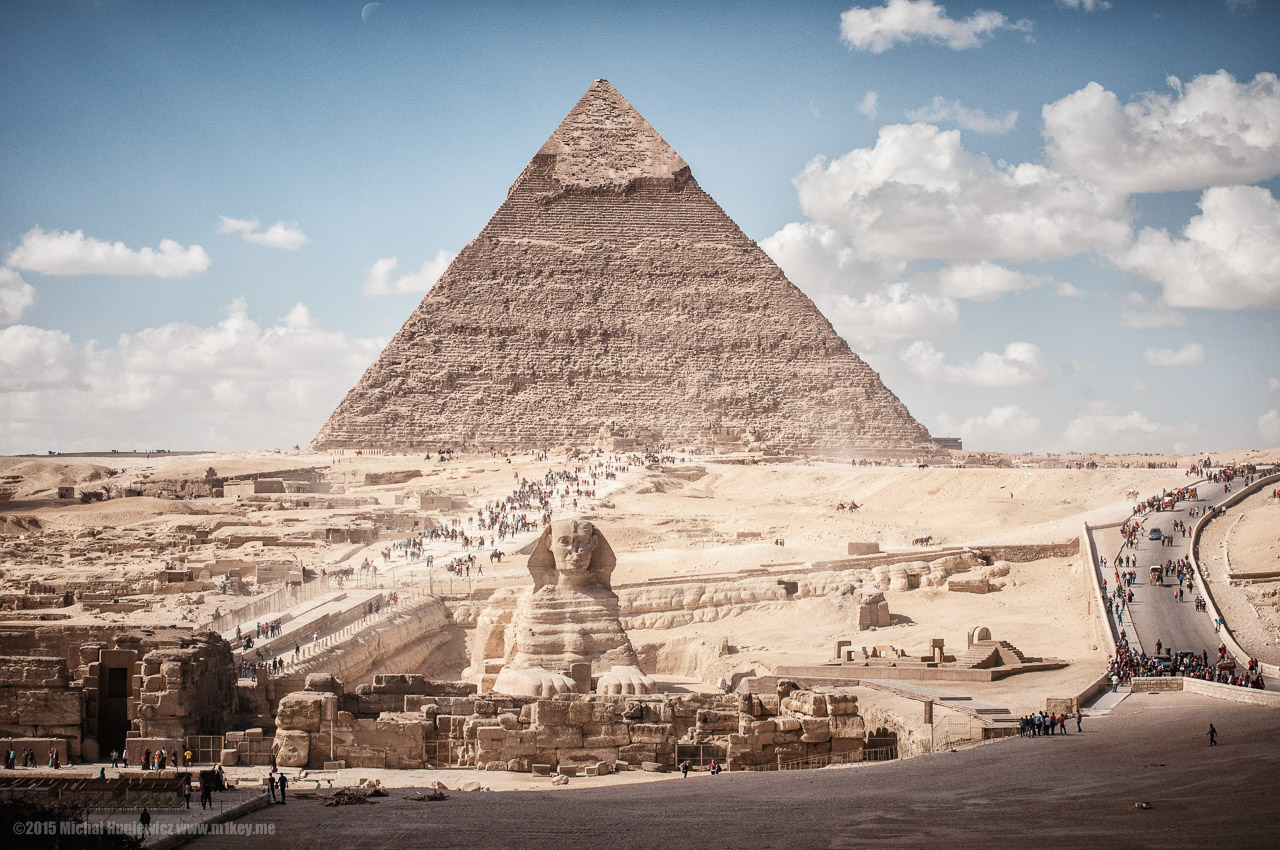
- The pyramid in 2014
- Interactive map of Pyramid of Khafre
- 29°58′34″N 31°07′51″E
- Owner: Khafre
Ancient name
< N5 N28 I9 > G36 O24
Wr Ḫa-f-re
Wer Khafre
Khafre is Great
- Constructed: c. 2550 BC
- Type: True pyramid
- Height: Currently: 136.4 metres (448 ft); Original: 143.5 m (471 ft; 274 cu)
- Base: 215.25 metres (706 ft; 411 cu)
- Volume: 2,211,096 cubic metres (78,084,118 ft^{3})
- Slope: 53°10'

The pyramid of Khafre or of Chephren (Arabic: هرم خفرع, romanized: Haram Khafraʿ) is the middle of the three Ancient Egyptian Pyramids of Giza, the second tallest and second largest of the group. It is the only pyramid out of the three that still has cladding at the top. It is the tomb of the Fourth-Dynasty Pharaoh Khafre (Chefren), who ruled c. 2558−2532 BC.

== Size ==
The pyramid has a base length of 215.5 m (706 ft) or 411 cubits and rises up to a height of 136.4 metres (448 ft) or 274 cubits. It is made of limestone blocks weighing more than 2 tons each. The slope of the pyramid rises at a 53° 08' angle, steeper than its neighbor, the pyramid of Khufu, which has an angle of 51° 50' 24". Khafre's pyramid sits on bedrock 10 m (33 ft) higher than Khufu's pyramid, which makes it appear to be taller.

Modern survey work using Total Station measurements shows that Khafre's pyramid is aligned very close to the cardinal directions, with minimal deviations from true north. The same study found small systematic differences between the alignments of Khafre's and Khufu's pyramids. This level of precision is usually considered as evidence that Old Kingdom builders used astronomical or advanced surveying methods to establish orientation.

== Construction ==
Like the Great Pyramid, a rock outcropping was used in the core. Due to the slope of the plateau, the northwest corner was cut 10 m (33 ft) out of the rock subsoil, and the southeast corner was built up.

The stones used at the bottom are very large, but as the pyramid rises, the stones become smaller, becoming only 50 cm (20 in) thick at the apex. The courses are rough and irregular for the first half of its height but a narrow band of regular masonry is clear in the midsection of the pyramid. At the northwest corner of the pyramid, the bedrock was fashioned into steps. Casing stones cover the top third of the pyramid, but the pyramidion and part of the apex are missing.

The bottom course of casing stones was made out of pink granite but the remainder of the pyramid was cased in Tura limestone. Close examination reveals that the corner edges of the remaining casing stones are not completely straight, but are staggered by a few millimeters. One theory is that this is due to settling from seismic activity. An alternative theory postulates that the slope on the blocks was cut to shape before being placed due to the limited working space towards the top of the pyramid.

== History ==
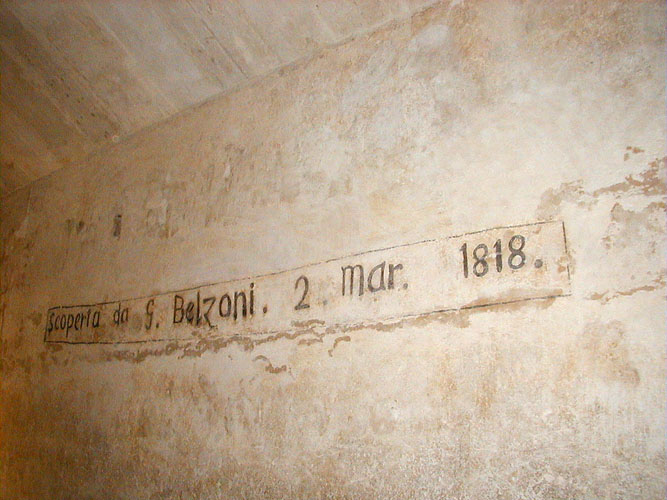
Inscription by Giovanni Belzoni, the first explorer of the pyramid in modern times

The pyramid was likely robbed as early as the First Intermediate Period, given that authors Bob Brier and Hoyt Hobbs claim that "all the pyramids were robbed" by the New Kingdom, when the construction of royal tombs in the Valley of the Kings began.

Arab historian Ibn Abd al-Salam recorded that the pyramid was opened in 1372. On the wall of the burial chamber, there is an Arabic graffito that probably dates from the same time.

It is not known when the rest of the casing stones were robbed; they were presumably still in place by 1646, when John Greaves, professor of Astronomy at the University of Oxford in his Pyramidographia, wrote that, while its stones were not as large or as regularly laid as in Khufu's, the surface was smooth and even free of breaches or inequalities, except on the south.

The pyramid was first explored in modern times by Giovanni Belzoni on March 2, 1818, when the original entrance was found on the north side. Belzoni had hopes of finding an intact burial but the chamber was empty except for an open sarcophagus and its broken lid on the floor.

The first complete exploration was conducted by John Perring in 1837. In 1853, Auguste Mariette partially excavated Khafre's valley temple, and, in 1858, while completing its clearance, he managed to discover a diorite statue of Khafre.

In 1932, American mountaineer Elbridge Rand Herron fell from the pyramid while climbing its outside surface and was killed instantly.

== Interior ==
Passageways and chambers inside the pyramid of Khafre

Two entrances lead to the burial chamber; one is located 11.54 m (37.9 ft) up the northern face of the pyramid, and the other at the base of the pyramid on the same axis. These passageways do not align with the centerline of the pyramid but are offset to the east by 12 m (39 ft). The lower descending passageway is carved completely out of the bedrock, descending, running horizontal, then ascending to join the horizontal passage leading to the burial chamber.

One theory as to why there are two entrances is that the pyramid's northern base was intended to be shifted 30 m (98 ft) further to the north which would make Khafre's pyramid much larger than his father's. This would place the entrance to the lower descending passage within the masonry of the pyramid. While the bedrock is cut away farther from the pyramid on the north side than on the west side, it is not clear that there is enough room on the plateau for the enclosure wall and pyramid terrace. An alternative theory is that, as with many earlier pyramids, plans were changed and the entrance was moved midway through construction.

There is a subsidiary chamber, equal in length to the King's Chamber in Khufu's pyramid, that opens to the west of the lower passage, the purpose of which is uncertain. It may be used to store offerings, store burial equipment, or it may be a serdab chamber. The upper descending passage is clad in granite and descends to join with the horizontal passage to the burial chamber.

The burial chamber was carved out of a pit in the bedrock. The roof is constructed of gabled limestone beams. The chamber is rectangular, 14.15 by 5 m (46.4 by 16.4 ft), and is oriented east–west. Khafre's sarcophagus was carved out of a solid block of granite and sunk partially in the floor, in it, Belzoni found bones of an animal, possibly a bull. Another pit in the floor likely contained the canopic chest, its lid would have been one of the pavement slabs.

There are two small rectangular holes in the walls of the burial chamber facing each other, greatly resembling the openings of the 'air shafts' found in the Great pyramid burial chambers.

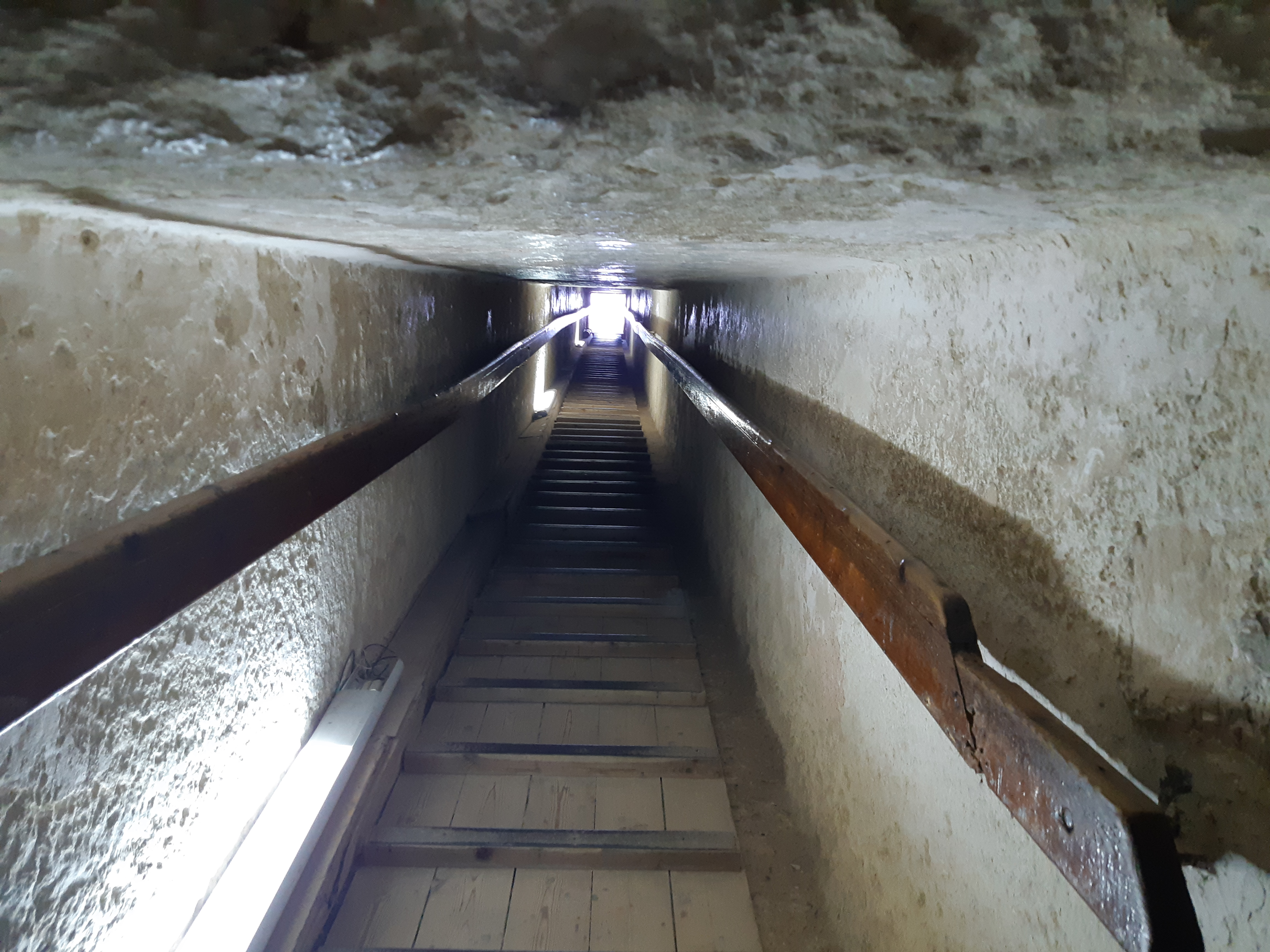
Initial ramp pass

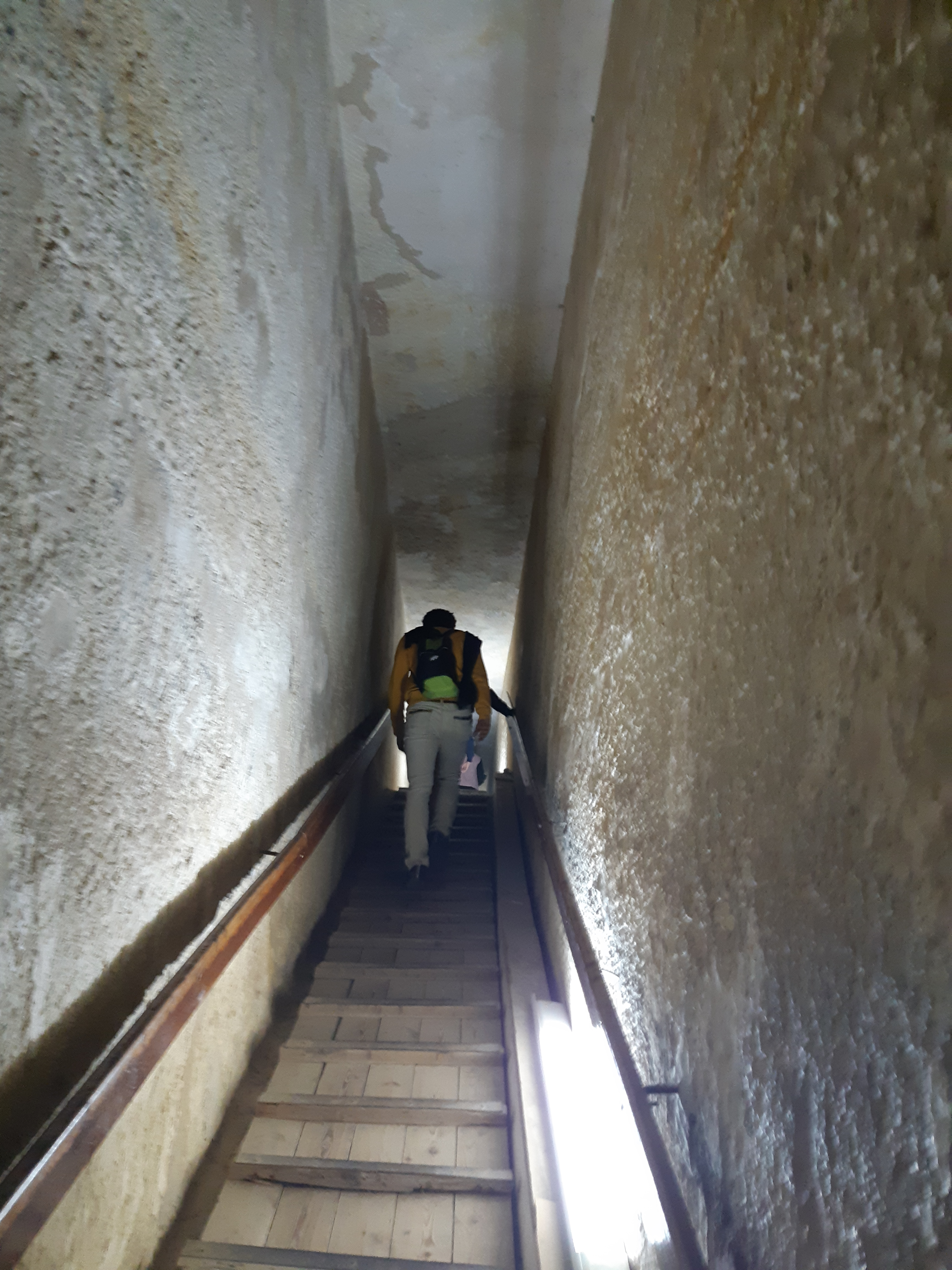
Top part of the inclined passage, with high ceiling

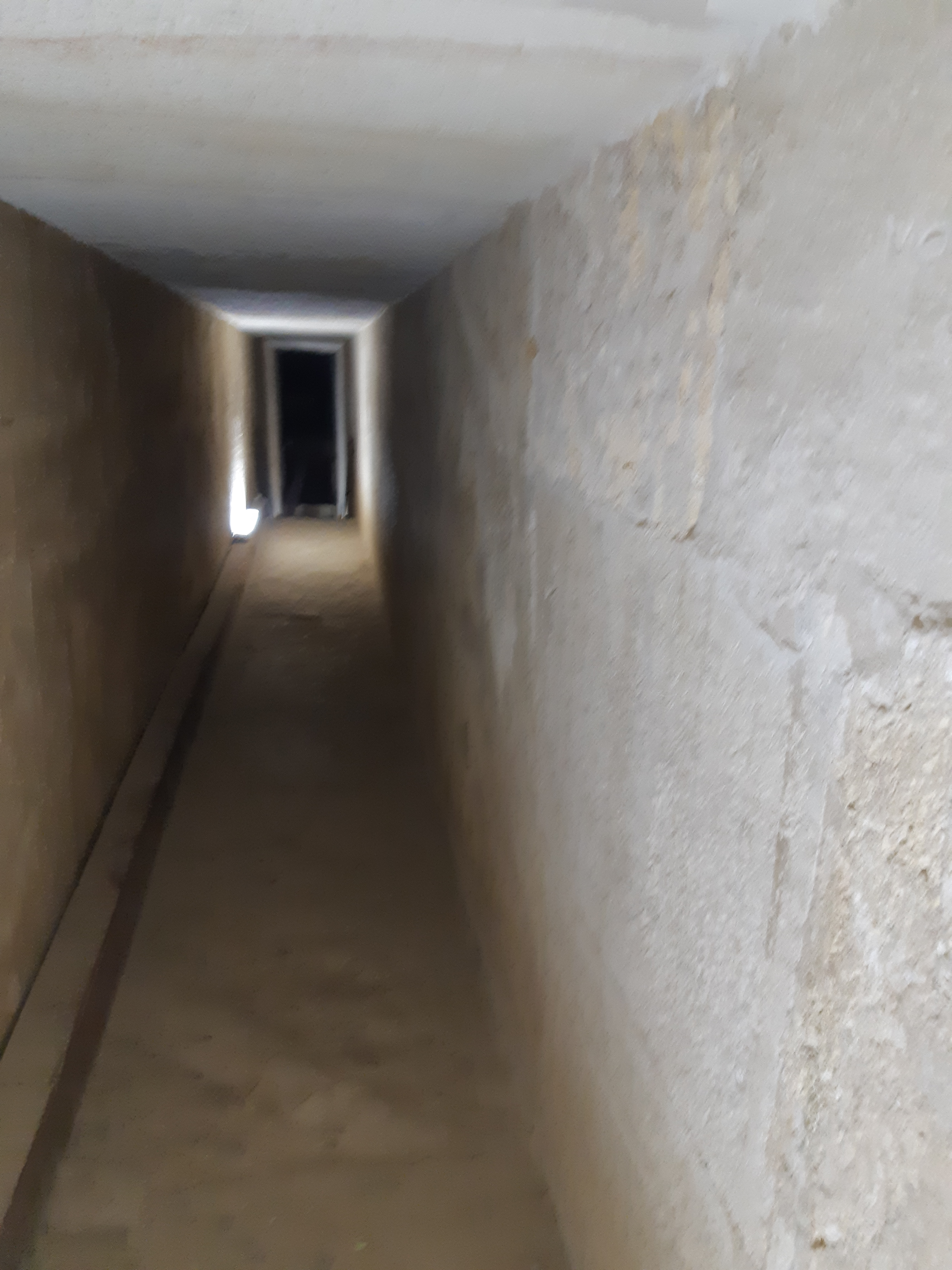
Straight section of the passage

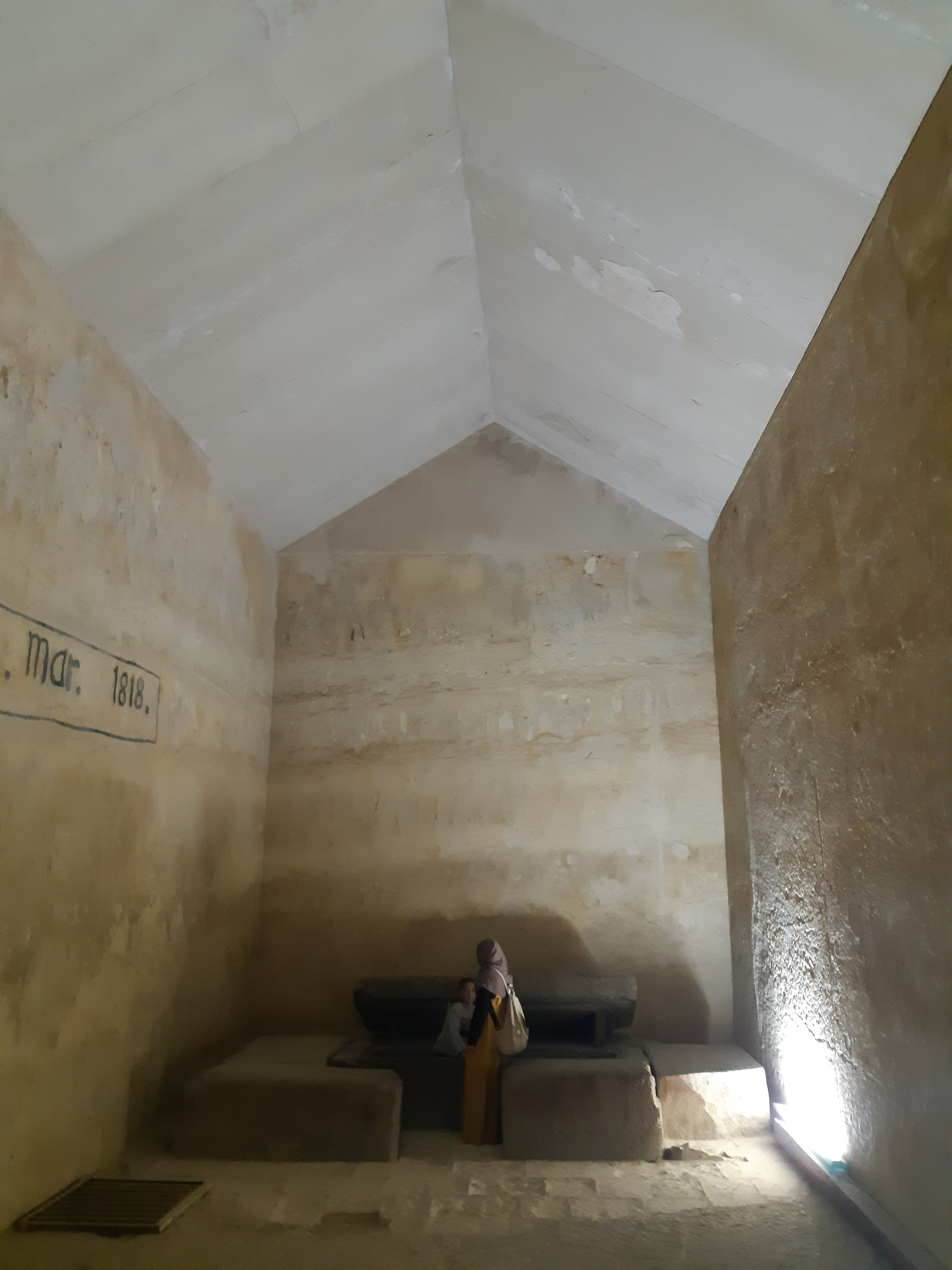
Burial chamber

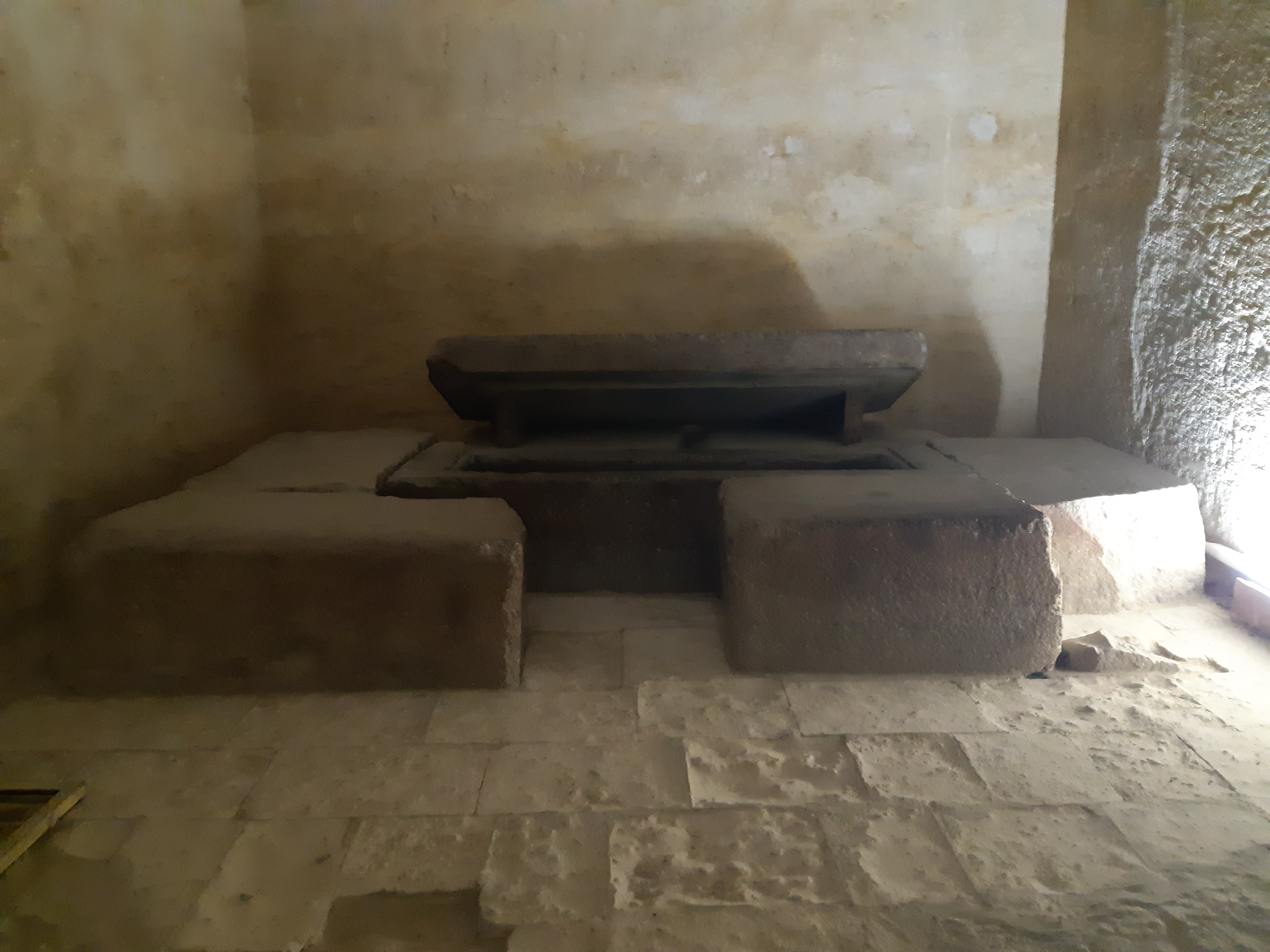
Khafre's sarcophagus

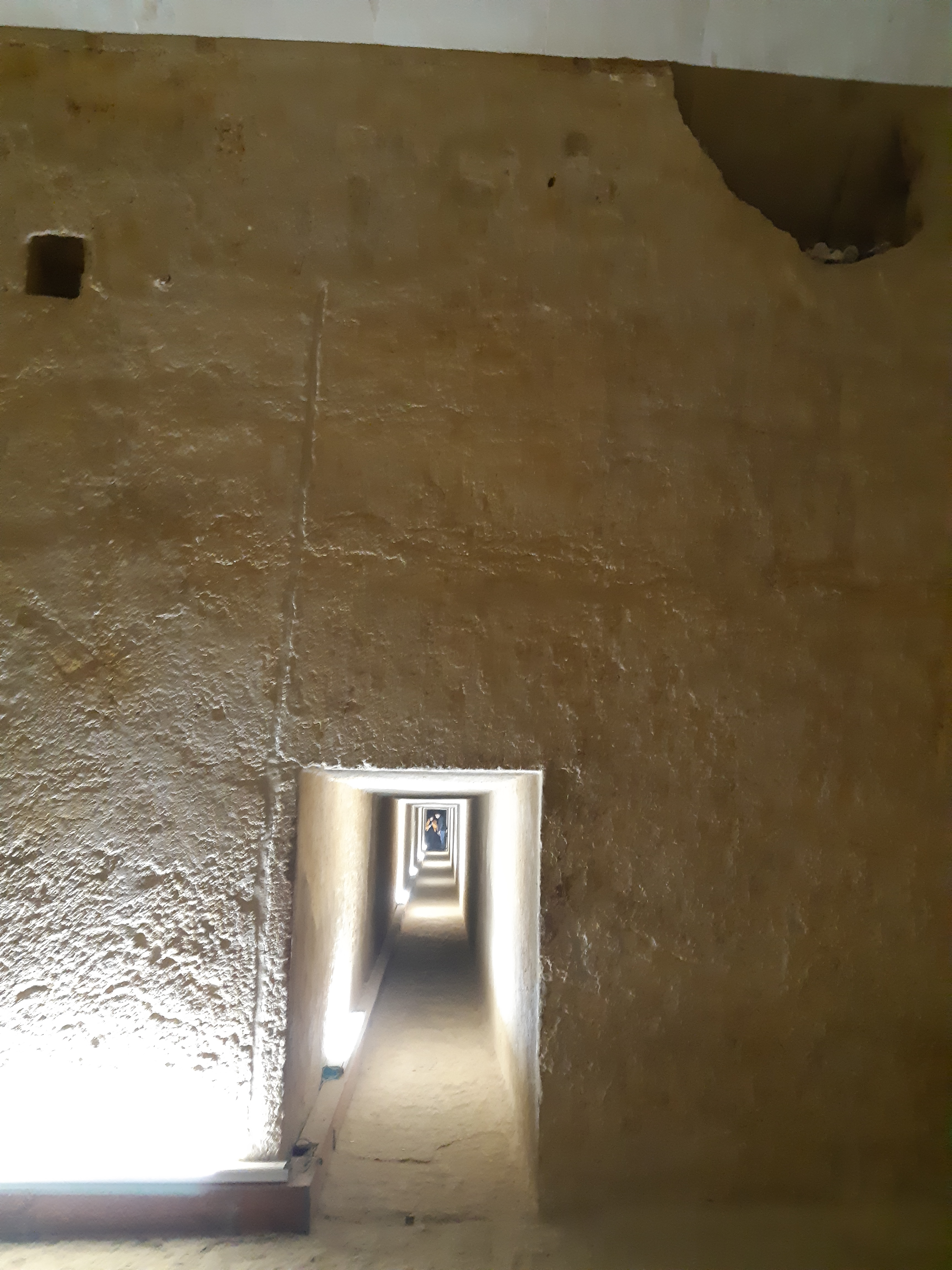
Exit from burial chamber; square hole: possible 'air shaft'

=== Muon scan ===
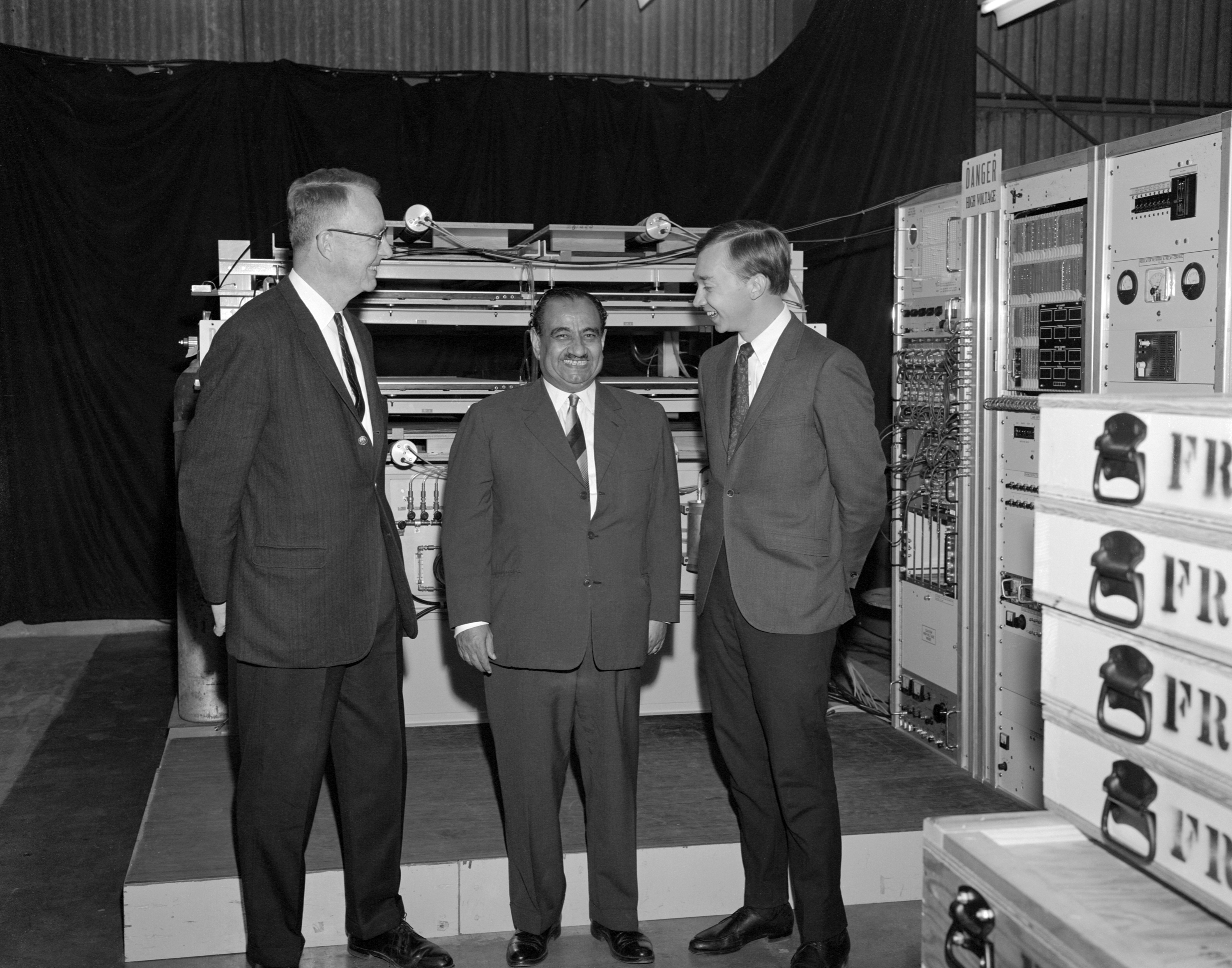
X-Raying the Pyramids with Egyptologist Ahmed Fakhry and Team Leader Jerry Anderson, Berkeley, 1967

In the 1960s, Luis Alvarez used muon transmission imaging to search for hidden chambers in the pyramid. Alvarez assembled a team of physicists and archeologists from the United States and Egypt. The recording equipment was constructed and the experiment carried out, though it was interrupted by the 1967 Six-Day War. After the war, the effort continued, recording and analyzing the penetrating cosmic rays until 1969, when he reported to the American Physical Society that no chambers had been found in the 19% of the pyramid surveyed.

== Pyramid complex ==
=== Satellite pyramid ===
Along the centerline of the pyramid on the south side was a satellite pyramid, but almost nothing remains other than some core blocks and the outline of the foundation. It contains two descending passages, one of them ending in a dead end with a niche which contained pieces of ritualistic furniture.

=== Khafre's temples ===
The temples of Khafre's complex survive in much better condition than Khufu's, this being especially true to the Valley Temple, which is substantially preserved. To the east of the Pyramid sits the mortuary temple. Though it is now largely in ruins, enough of it survives to understand the plan. It is larger than previous temples and is the first to include all five standard elements of later mortuary temples: an entrance hall, a columned court, five niches for statues of the pharaoh, five storage chambers, and an inner sanctuary. There were over 50 life size statues of Khafre, but these were removed and recycled, possibly by Ramses II. The temple was built of megalithic blocks (the largest is an estimated 400 tonnes).

A causeway runs 494.6 metres (541 yd) to the valley temple, which is very similar to the mortuary temple. It is built of megalithic blocks sheathed in red granite. The square pillars of the T-shaped hallway were made of solid granite, and the floor was paved in alabaster. The exterior was built of huge blocks, some weighing over 100 tonnes. Though devoid of any internal decoration, this temple would have been filled with symbolism: two doors open into a vestibule and a large pillared hall, in which there were sockets in the floor that would have fixed 23 statues of Khafre. These columns have since been plundered. The interior, made of granite of the Valley Temple, is remarkably well preserved. The exterior made of limestone is much more weathered.

The so-called temple of the Sphinx is not attested to any king, but structural similarities to Khafre's mortuary temple point to him as its builder. Opening to a hall with 24 columns, each with its own statue, two sanctuaries and symmetric design, it is possible but unsure if this temple had any symbolism attached to the finished plan.

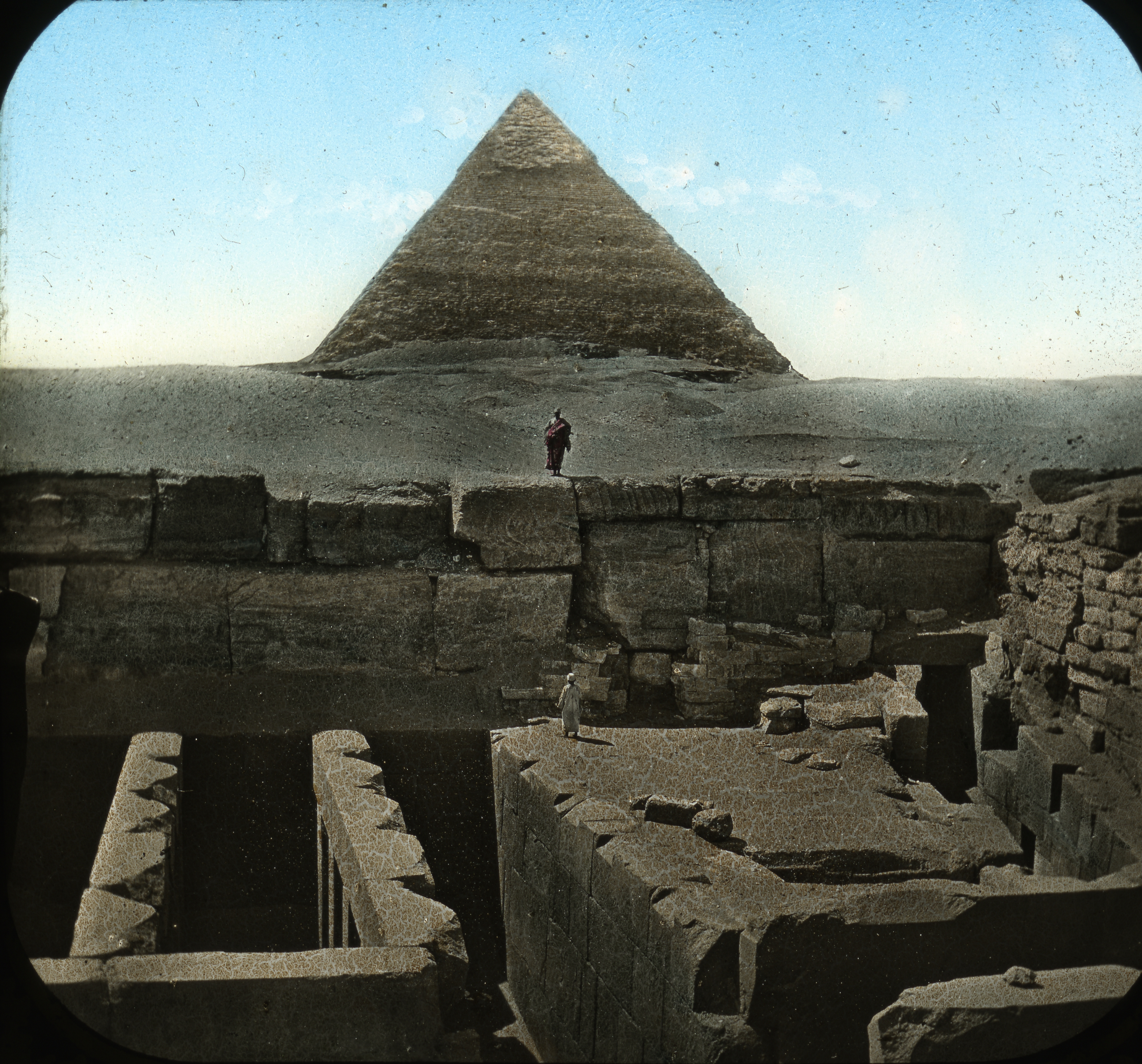
Valley Temple to the east of the pyramid of Khafre

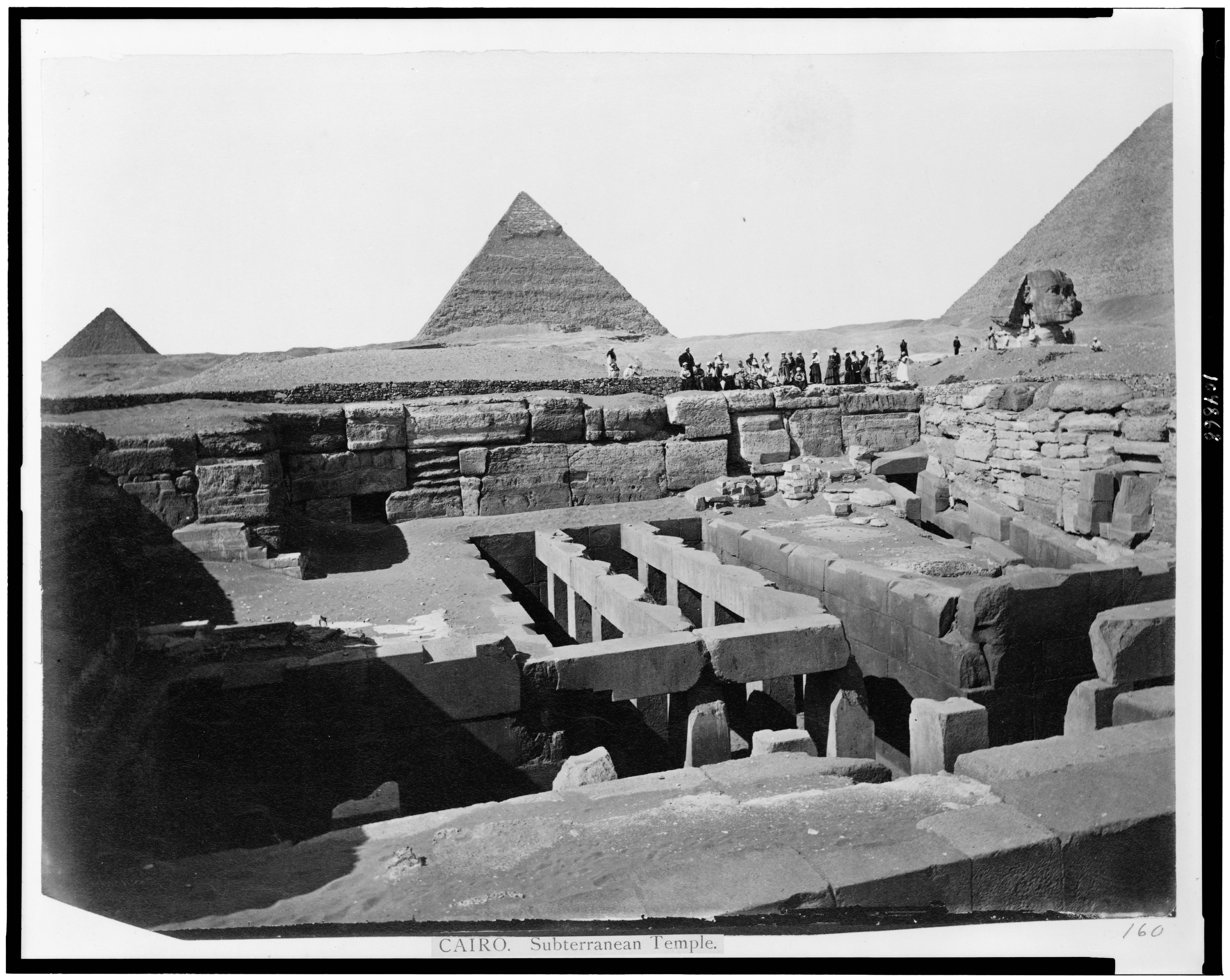
Subterranean temple, 1860

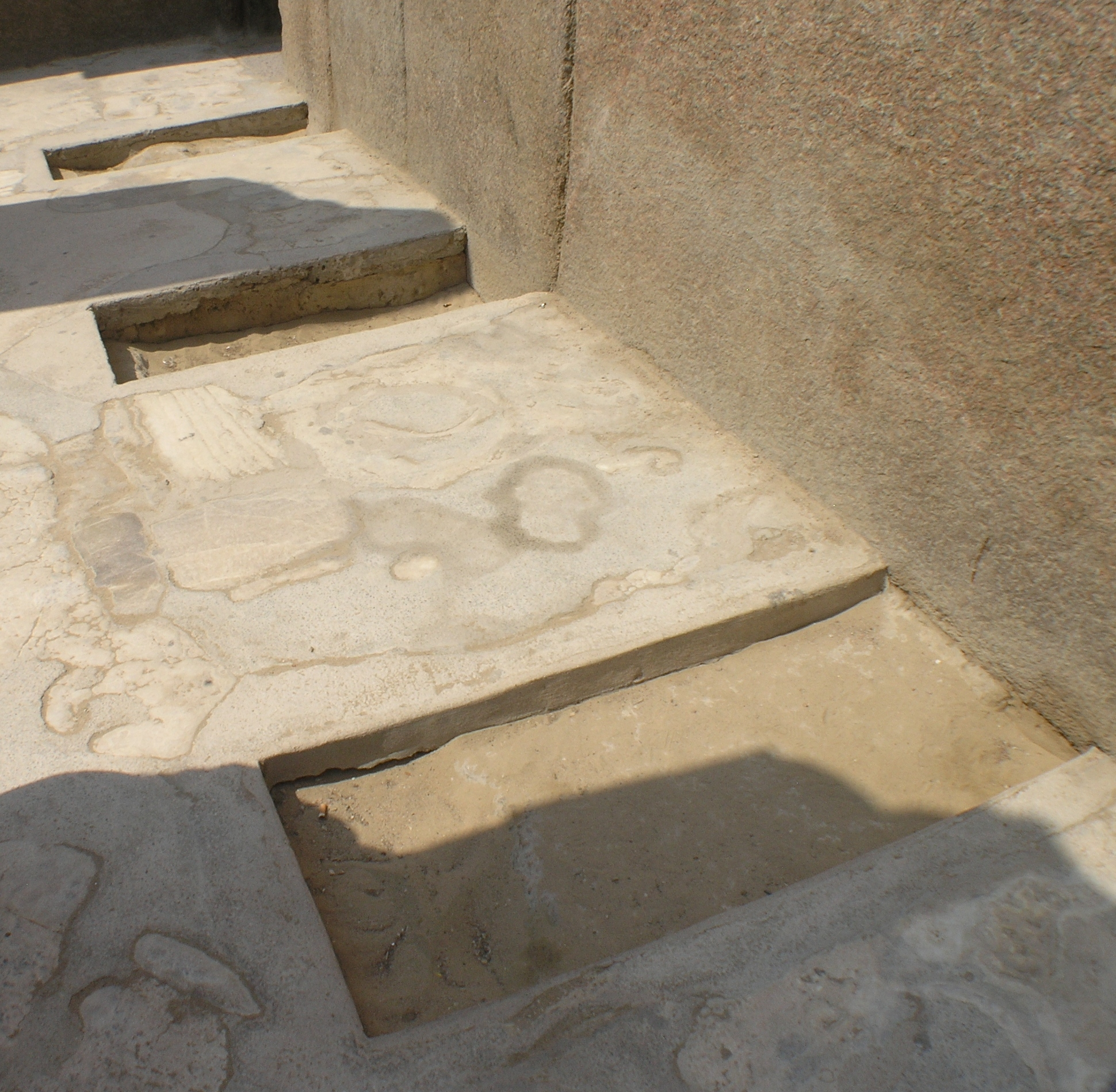
Depressions in the floor of the Valley Temple that once held the statues of Khafre

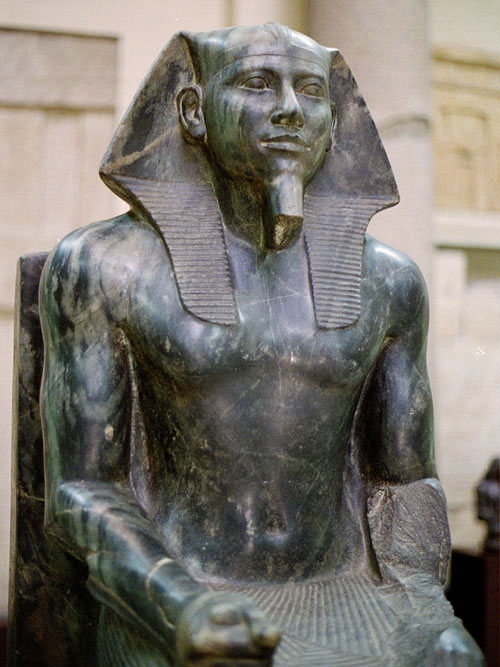
Khafre Enthroned, one of the statues of the Valley Temple

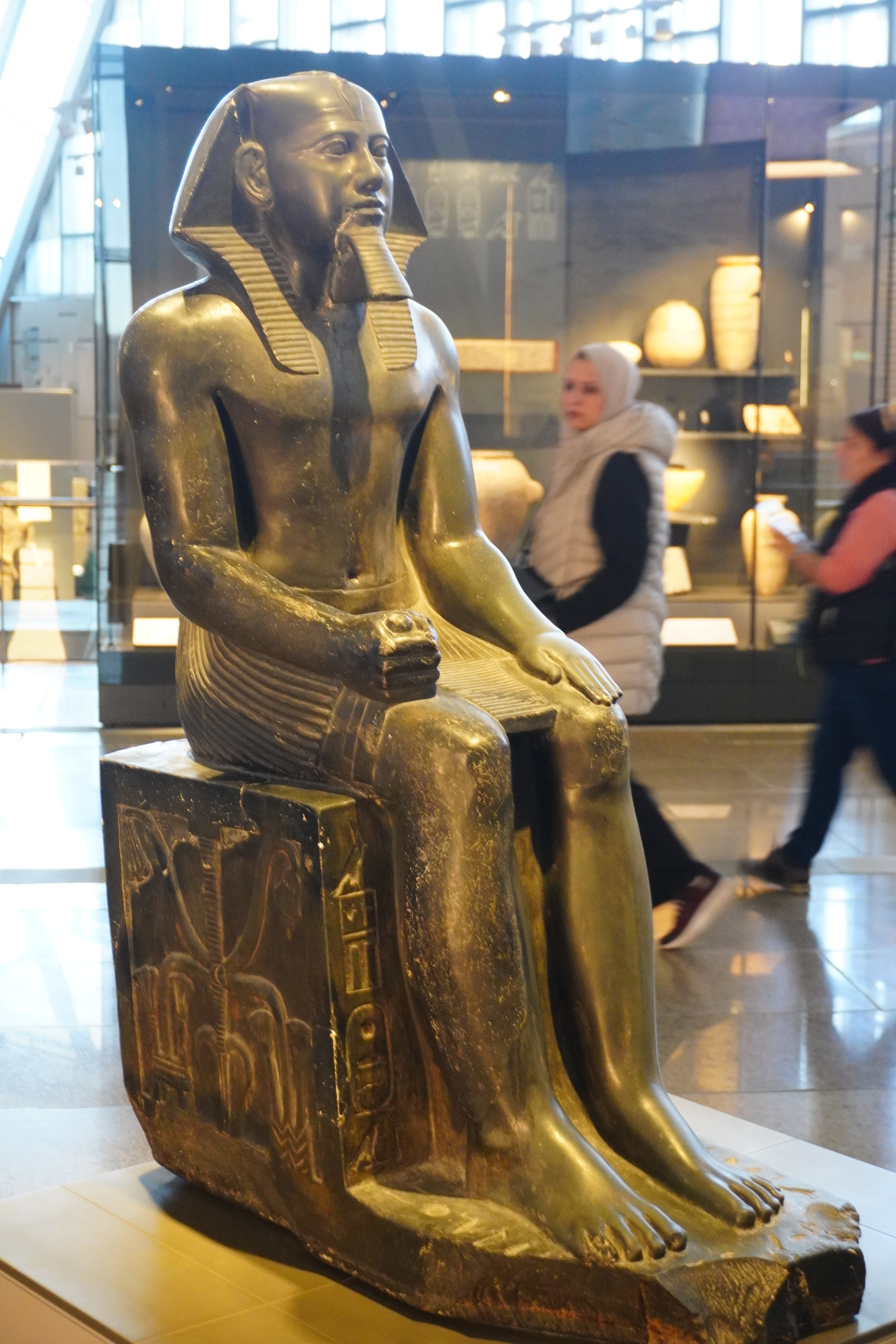
Another statue of Khafre from the Valley Temple, now at the Grand Egyptian Museum

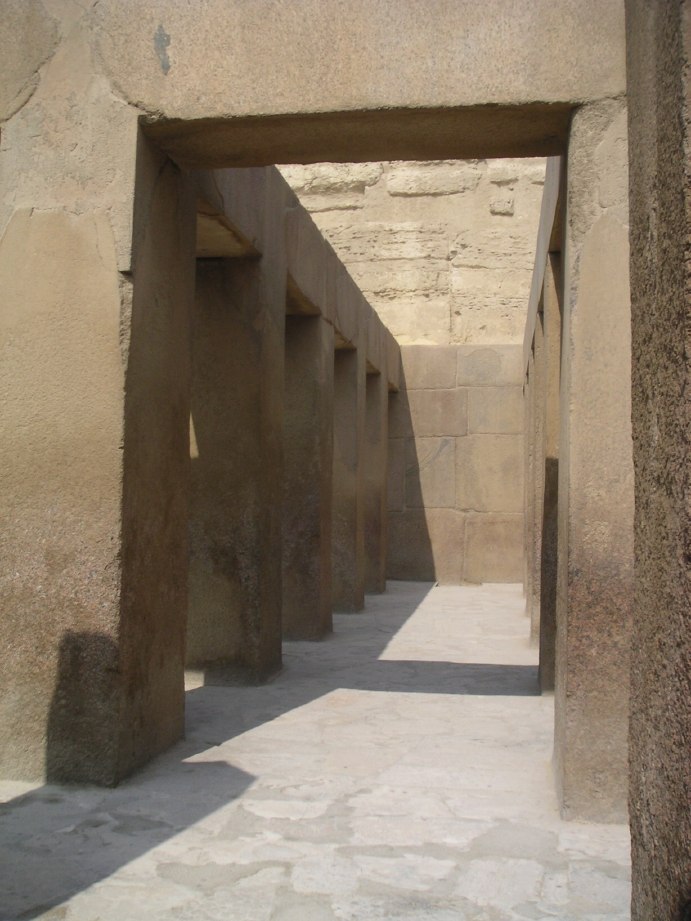
Pillared hallway of the Valley Temple

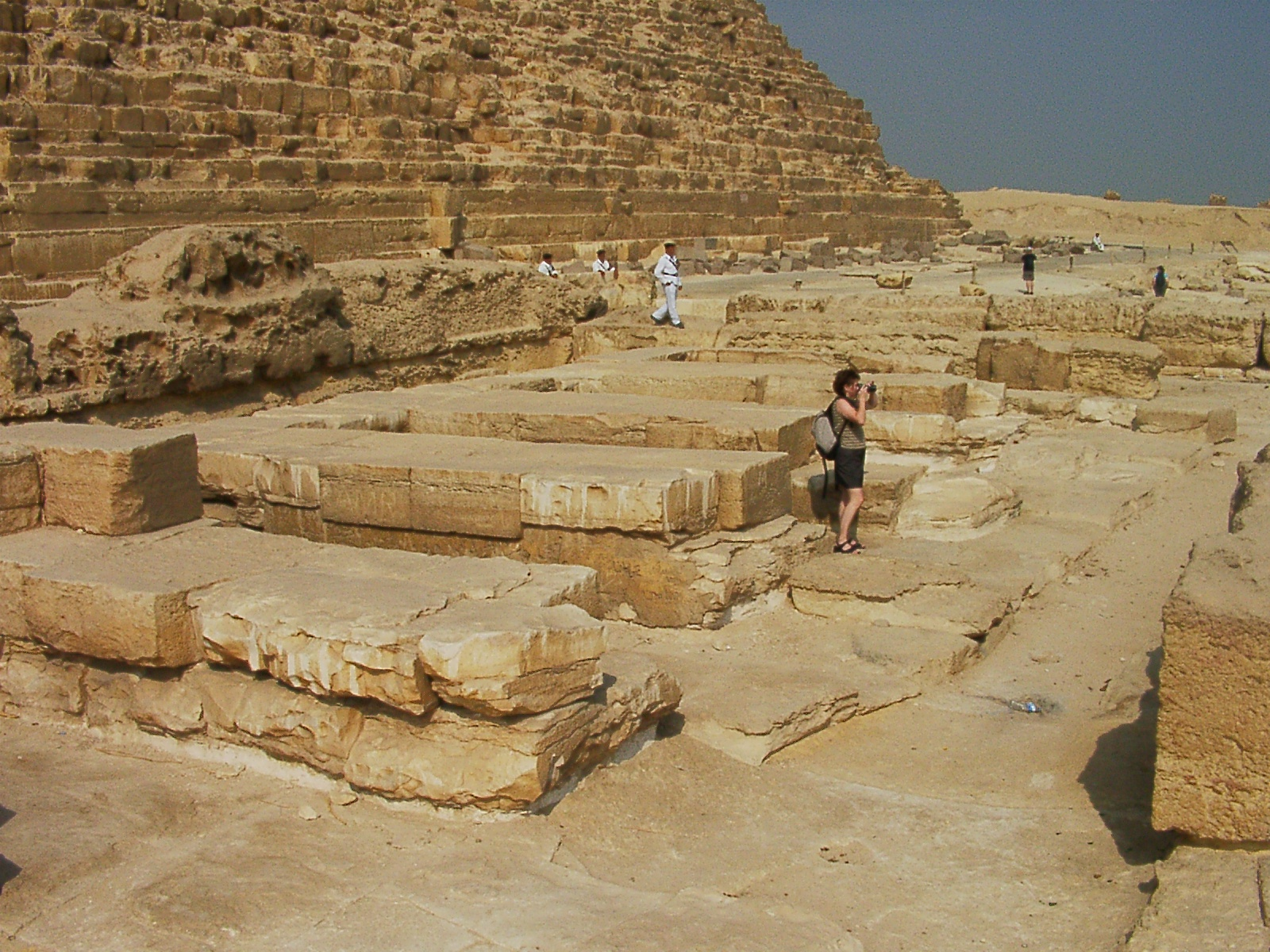
Remains of the magazines of the Mortuary Temple

=== Sphinx ===
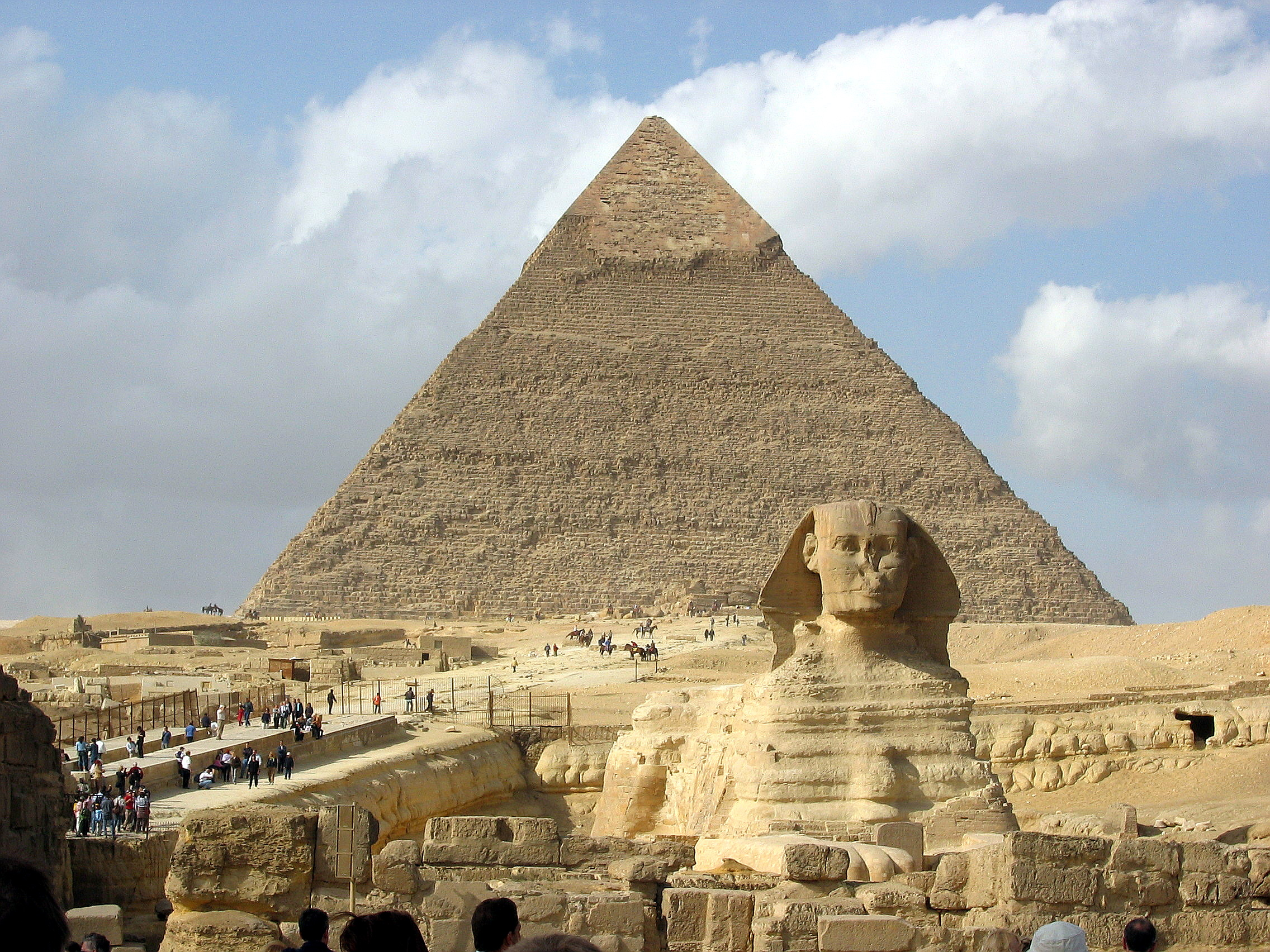
The pyramid of Khafre and the Great Sphinx of Giza, 2005

The Great Sphinx may have been part of the complex. It was carved out of a rock formation used to cut the blocks for the pyramid itself.

Comparison of approximate profiles of the Pyramid of Khafre with some notable pyramidal or near-pyramidal buildings. Dotted lines indicate original heights, where data is available. In its SVG file, hover over a pyramid to highlight and click for its article.

== See also ==
- Egyptian pyramid construction techniques
- List of Egyptian pyramids
- List of megalithic sites
- List of tallest structures built before the 20th century

== Sources ==
- Lehner, Mark (2008). The Complete Pyramids. New York: Thames & Hudson. ISBN 978-0-500-28547-3.
- Verner, Miroslav (2001d). The Pyramids: The Mystery, Culture and Science of Egypt's Great Monuments. New York: Grove Press. ISBN 978-0-8021-1703-8.
