= Pyramid of Khentkaus I =

Step tomb of a Fourth Dynasty queen

Step tomb of Khentkaus I
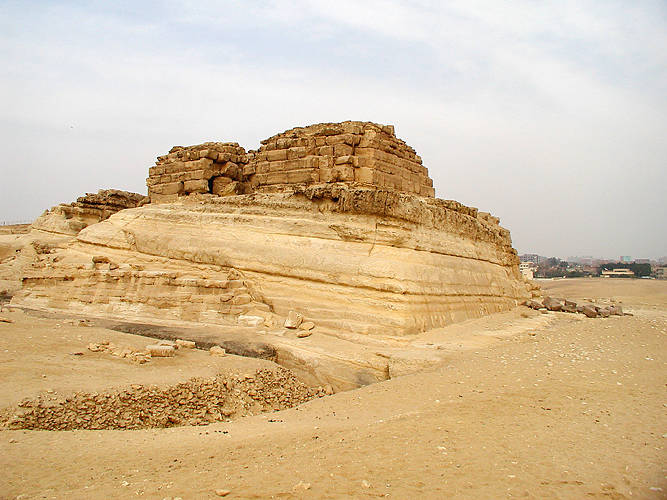

- Location within Egypt
- 29°58′23.9″N 31°8′7.3″E
- Owner: Khentkaus I
Ancient name
W17 X1 D28 D28 D28 S29
Ḫnt-kꜣw.s
Khent-kaus
- Constructed: Fourth Dynasty of Egypt
- Type: Step tomb
- Material: Bedrock, Limestone
- Height: 10 m (33 ft; 19 cu) (1st step); 7 m (23 ft; 13 cu) (2nd step); 17.5 m (57 ft; 33.4 cu) (total)
- Base: 45.8 m (150 ft; 87.4 cu) by 45.5 m (149 ft; 86.8 cu) (1st step); 28.5 m (94 ft; 54.4 cu) by 21 m (69 ft; 40 cu) (2nd step)
- Volume: 6,372 m^{3} (8,334 cu yd) (2nd step)
- Slope: 74°

The pyramid of Khentkaus I or step tomb of Khentkaus I is a Fourth Dynasty two-stepped tomb built for the Queen Mother Khentkaus I in Giza. The tomb, built in two phases coinciding with its two steps, was originally known as the fourth pyramid of Giza. In the first phase, a nearly square block of bedrock, around which the stone had been quarried for the Giza pyramids, was utilised to construct her tomb and encased with fine white Tura limestone. In the second phase, most likely in the Fifth Dynasty, her tomb was enlarged with a large limestone structure built on top of the bedrock block. The Egyptologist Miroslav Verner suggests that this may have been intended to convert her tomb into a pyramid, but was abandoned as a result of stability concerns. South-west of the tomb was a long boat pit, which housed the Night boat of Re. A companion day boat has not been found. A chapel was built into the tomb superstructure, with a large granite entrance bearing the queen's name and titles. One of her titles was of particular interest because it had not been known of prior to its discovery at her tomb.

The chapel connected to a three-niched statuary room to its west, and a long hall to its north. The hall to the north housed two pink granite false doors, below one of which was a sloped passage into the tomb substructure comprising an antechamber and a bisected burial chamber. In the east half of the burial chamber were entrances to six storage magazines, and two more pink granite false doors in its west wall. The west half of the chamber was once occupied by a large alabaster sarcophagus, fragments of which constituted the only significant finds by Selim Hassan. Carved into the north wall was a shelf which once stored the canopic jars of the burial. A small square niche had been cut into the south wall.

A settlement was built around Khentkaus' tomb, and probably occupied by priests of her mortuary cult until the end of the Sixth Dynasty. The settlement was bounded to the north and south by long perimeter walls running east then south. Along a causeway leading from the chapel through the town, ten carefully planned homes were built, suggesting that the town was designed and not the result of natural urban development. The town was further outfitted with granaries and a large water tank. To the south-west were Menkaure's valley temple, and an annex described by Hassan as Khentkaus' valley temple.

== Location and excavation ==
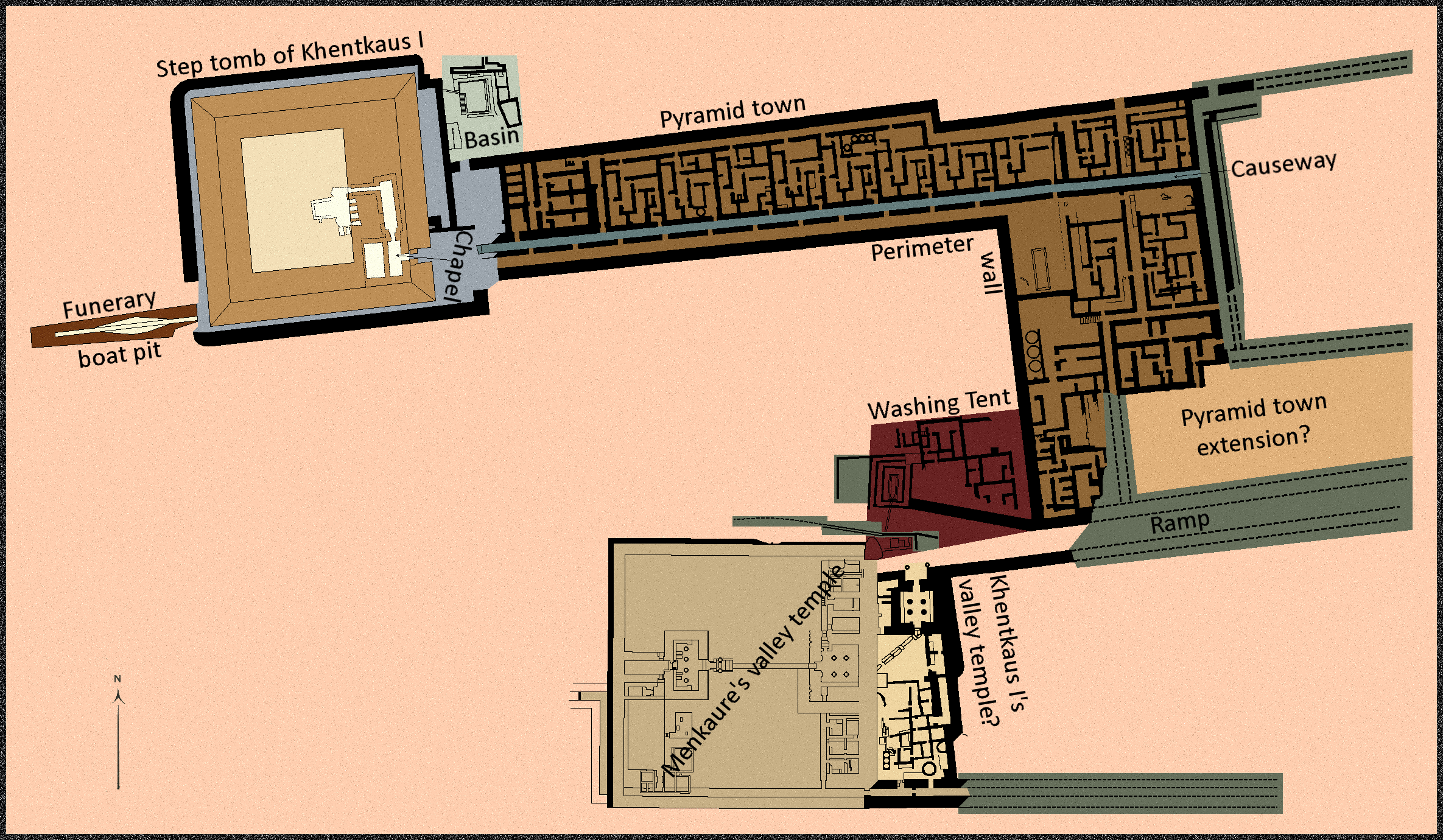
Khentkaus I's mortuary complex

The tomb, located on the Giza Plateau, was originally believed by some Egyptologists to be a "fourth pyramid of Giza". It was identified as a pyramid by John Shae Perring and Colonel Howard Vyse who visited the site in 1837–1838. The site was visited the following year by Karl Richard Lepsius, on sponsorship from King Frederick William IV of Prussia. He believed the tomb was a private one, and designated it 100 on his map. In 1912, Uvo Hölscher identified the structure as "the unfinished pyramid of Shepseskaf". (Note: [...] unfertige Pyramide des Schepes-kaf [...]) George Andrew Reisner identified it as a king's pyramid, believing it to be an incomplete construction of Shepseskaf, in Mycerinus, the temples of the third pyramid at Giza (1931). In 1932, Selim Hassan was able to demonstrate that the tomb belonged to Khentkaus I. The name and titles of the queen were found inscribed on blocks of red granite from the doorjambs of the chapel. Hers was the last royal monument built on the plateau.

== Mortuary complex ==
=== Superstructure ===
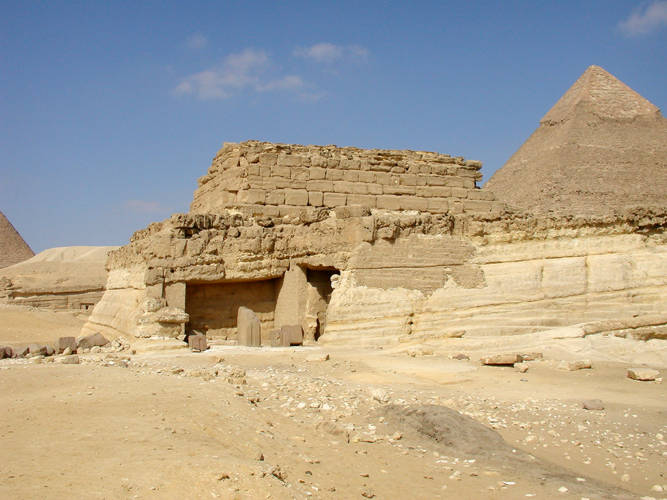
South-east corner of and entrance to Khentkaus I's tomb

The tomb has a two-stepped superstructure, which can not properly be classified either as a mastaba or as a pyramid. Selim Hassan compared it to Djoser's step pyramid, which had a square base in its early development, to favour a pyramid designation. (Note: Djoser's step pyramid underwent a series of developmental stages, beginning with a square base of 63 m (207 ft; 120 cu) to a side, labelled by Jean-Philippe Lauer as M1.)

The lower step is nearly square in shape and has dimensions 45.8 m × 45.5 m (150 ft × 149 ft; 87.4 cu × 86.8 cu) with a height of 10 m (33 ft; 19 cu). This step had a north-south orientation, and was cut into bedrock – reserved for the tomb whilst the stone around it was quarried for the Giza Pyramids – and encased in fine white Tura limestone with a given slope of about 74°. The casing was well preserved on the west and north faces, but near totally destroyed on the south face. At this time, it had the appearance of a truncated pyramid, and was adorned on all four sides with niches resembling false doors, in the motif of the palace façade.

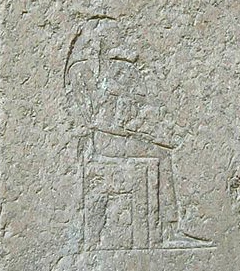
Relief of Khentkaus I sitting on a throne while wearing a vulture crown and holding a scepter

Most likely in the first half of the Fifth Dynasty of Egypt, Khentkaus' tomb was significantly altered and a second step, constructed entirely of limestone, built over the west half of the superstructure. The structure was composed of seven courses of locally quarried limestone, with blocks larger than those used in the construction of Khufu's pyramid, but becoming gradually smaller towards the top. The displacement was intentional, as the structure's weight might have collapsed the tomb altogether had it been centred. The step is mastaba-like having dimensions of 28.5 m × 21 m (94 ft × 69 ft; 54.4 cu × 40.1 cu) with a height of 7 m (23 ft; 13 cu), and was slightly vaulted, in a fashion similar to Shepseskaf's mastaba. Overall, the structure was 17.5 m (57 ft; 33.4 cu) tall, and was fully encased in white Tura limestone. The Egyptologist Miroslav Verner believes this expansion was intended to convert the tomb into a full pyramid, possibly up to three steps high, but that concern over the tomb's stability prevented its construction.

The tomb was enclosed on three sides – north, west, and south – by a 2.75 m (9.0 ft) thick, whitewashed mudbrick perimeter wall. The south wall starts with a bend at the edge of the solar boat pit, runs for 61 m (200 ft) along the entire east wall, and then along the north wall for 4 m (13 ft) terminating at the southern jamb of the courtyard entrance. The east side had a high wall cut into the rock, which formed a chamber with the pyramid where the queen was embalmed.

The expansion project appears to coincide with an elevation in the status of Khentkaus I. She had a title that had not previously been found anywhere else in ancient Egypt, which has been interpreted as either "Mother of two kings of Upper and Lower Egypt" or "King of Upper and Lower Egypt, and Mother of the King of Upper and Lower Egypt". An inscription bearing that title was uncovered at the pyramid of Khentkaus I along with an image that depicts Khentkaus I wearing the Vulture crown, ritual beard, and wielding a scepter, indicators of possible kingship. However, her name does not appear in cartouche, nor in any king list, indicating against a reign. It appears that her monument was constructed by her sons, speculatively proposed to be Shepseskaf and Userkaf.

M23 L2 X1 X1 M23 L2 X1 X1 G14 R8 G39 X1 I10 D46 X1 Aa1 X1 V30 F35 D21 X1 D4 X1 N35 S29 W17 X1 D28 D28 D28 S29
nswt-bỉty mwt nswt-bỉty sꜣ.t-nṯr ḏd.t ḫt nb.t nfr.t ỉr.t n.s. Ḫnt-kꜣw.s
'The King of Upper and Lower Egypt, the Mother of the King of Upper and Lower Egypt, every good thing which she orders is done for her, Khent-kawes'
—as translated by Selim Hassan

=== Causeway ===
A covered causeway, composed of three parallel walls, led from the valley to a chapel, situated on the south-east side of the tomb. Originally, the north causeway wall and the south perimeter wall left a passage 5–5.2 m (16–17 ft) wide. This was later split into two with the construction of a southern causeway wall which left a causeway passage around 1.6 m (5.2 ft) wide and a southern street passage around 2.2 m (7.2 ft) wide. The southern perimeter wall was dismantled, either naturally or from human interference, and later rebuilt. The original construction was made of large mudbrick brick of dark silt, the rebuild was made of small mudbricks of sandy silt, cased with limestone chips.

=== Chapel ===
The chapel has a paved courtyard in front of it, and is entered through a large pink granite gate – its southern jamb measured 1.25 m (4.1 ft) wide by 2 m (6.6 ft) tall – which bear Khentkaus I's name and titles. Although both jambs were severely damaged by stone thieves, their inscription and the image of the queen have been preserved. The entrance, recessed 2.85 m (9.4 ft) deep into the superstructure bedrock, led into the chapel, 2.6 m (8.5 ft; 5.0 cu) by 2.7 m (8.9 ft; 5.2 cu), paved and lined with fine white Tura limestone. To the west was a three-niched statuary room, lined with fine white limestone and decorated with bas-relief scenes and inscriptions. To the north was a second chamber, 11.8 metres (39 ft; 22.5 cu) by 4.5 metres (15 ft; 8.6 cu), entered through a black granite doorway. It housed two pink granite false doors in its west wall, below one was a shaft which led into the substructure.

=== Substructure ===
The substructure of the tomb bears semblance to both a private and a royal tomb. It was accessed though a 5.6 m (18 ft) long, 0.9 m (3.0 ft) wide, granite paved and lined, down-sloped passage terminating at an antechamber. The burial chamber was split into two halves. The eastern chamber was 7.85 m (25.8 ft) long, 2.7 m (8.9 ft) wide, and 3.7 m (12 ft) high. In its east and south walls were six storage rooms, with entrance passages generally 1 m (3.3 ft) by 0.5 m (1.6 ft), and cells between 1.5 m (4.9 ft) and 1.6 m (5.2 ft) deep, 1 m (3.3 ft) wide, and 1.4 m (4.6 ft) high. On the west wall of the chamber are two more false doors, 3.3 m (11 ft) tall and 0.95 m (3.1 ft) wide, that had been cut into the wall, and probably cased in high quality stone. The western chamber, 4.60 m (15.1 ft; 8.78 cu) by 3.96 m (13.0 ft; 7.56 cu), contained the sarcophagus of the queen, along with a square niche to the south and a rock-carved shelf, which probably stored canopic jars, to the north. Most of the western chamber was occupied by a 3.6 m (12 ft) by 3 m (9.8 ft) depression cut into the ground. The only significant remains of the burial that Selim Hassan discovered were fragments of an alabaster sarcophagus, along with a brown limestone scarab from the Twelfth Dynasty.

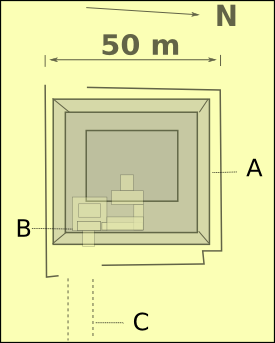
Layout of the interior of Khentkaus I's tomb

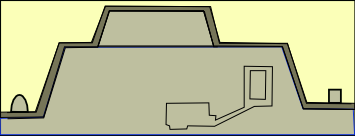
Interior and exterior structure of Khentkaus I's tomb

=== Solar barque ===
Situated at the south-west corner of the tomb, is an east-west oriented, 30.25 m (99.2 ft; 57.73 cu) long and 4.25 m (13.9 ft; 8.11 cu) deep boat pit. The walls of this pit were built of mortared rubble. It contained a vessel with an upraised prow and stern. Based on findings of white limestone and black granite blocks, Hassan concluded that the ship was roofed, and therefore the night boat of Re for passage through the Duat. A corresponding day barque was not found, but may be located on the west side of the tomb.

== Pyramid town ==
An L-shaped settlement of mudbrick houses was built in a linear fashion east and south of the tomb, and enclosed by a perimeter wall. The south perimeter wall runs east for 104 m (341 ft) from the courtyard doorjamb, turns south for 43 m (141 ft), before bending back to the east after which the wall is lost under a cemetery. The north wall starts from the other courtyard doorjamb, runs east for 97 m (318 ft), turns south for 5 m (16 ft), continues east for a further 51 m (167 ft), before a final turn south where it too is lost under the cemetery. The two walls form the boundary of the pyramid town of Khentkaus' complex.

The pyramid town was carefully planned by architects for Khentkaus I's complex, rather than resulting from natural urban development, and was built entirely from mudbrick. Ten houses were lined eastwards against the causeway, and split into two groups. The first six homes each had two entrances – north leading to a street, and south leading to the causeway – a porter's lobby, a reception, a living room, two bedrooms, an open court, a kitchen, a water reservoir and a domestic office. Minor deviations existed between homes, such as a granary occupying the kitchen of one house and the reception area of another, but they otherwise conformed to this standard plan. The remaining four have a similar plan, but omit the porter's lobby and reception room, and the last of these homes is separated from the preceding three by an intersecting, north-south oriented street. In Hassan's opinion, the priests of the queen's mortuary cult occupied the lodgings, tending to the cult until the end of the Sixth Dynasty. Lehner et al. (2011) suggest that, although concrete evidence is lacking, the occupants of the southern homes of the town may have served either or both Khentkaus' and Menkaure's mortuary cults. Despite this, the layout and orientation of Menkaure's and Khentkaus' structures suggest a separation between their monuments and estates.

There was originally a limestone double-leaved door where the street intersected with the perimeter wall, and it was outfitted with a subway passing under the causeway. The subway was cut into the bedrock to a maximum depth of 2.47 m (8.1 ft) and had a passageway 0.9 m (3.0 ft) wide. Thirteen steps were cut into the north side, but the less steep south side was left smooth. The passage was not completed, as evidenced by 0.5 m (1.6 ft) bulges left at the bottom of the subway, and may have had limited utility to the town dwellers. The street, 2 m (6.6 ft) wide, continues south for 17 m (56 ft) to an intersection with an east-west running street. Here another double-leaved door originally stood. To the west, a staircase led to the granaries, and separated by a mudbrick wall to the north, a massive 29 m (95 ft) by 8.5 m (28 ft) water tank. The granaries were tucked behind a thin retaining wall, beyond which was a courtyard and two long narrow rooms. From the granary courtyard a passage leads south to a T-shaped court with two storage rooms, and further south to a large home, probably the abode of the official in charge of the granaries.

Near the west end of the southern lodgings was a house with thicker walls, suggesting that it held some particular significance, possibly even as a token palace. Due south-west of it, merged into Menkaure's valley temple and pyramid town, was a building labelled by Hassan as Khentkaus I's valley temple.

== Valley temple ==
According to Hassan, Khentkaus' valley temple was accessed by a long "wide, brick-paved causeway" which passed between the south perimeter wall of the pyramid town and the north wall of the temple, and continued along the entirety of the east face of Menkaure's valley temple. The archaeologist Barry Kemp identifies the temple as an annex of Menkaure's valley temple, and the vestibule as a second gatehouse. Inside a storage room, Hassan uncovered a fragment of an alabaster offering table which bore the partial inscription "... her father, king's daughter", and hieroglyphs which Hassan interpreted as being the triple Ka hieroglyph of Khentkaus' name. The Egyptologist Mark Lehner concedes that this is a very plausible reading, but not entirely certain, and does not prove that the temple itself was built for Khentkaus. During excavations between 2005 and 2009, Hassan's "wide, brick-paved causeway" was revealed to be an ascending ramp. The ramp does not appear to interface with Khentkaus' causeway, which itself traverses east-west and has no identifiable deviation to the south. The most direct identifiable path from her pyramid town to this ramp would be via an exit in the south-east corner of her town, an area which has not yet been cleared.

The main entrance to the temple is on the north side – highly atypical, as a valley temple is usually entered from the east, but this may have been impractical owing the possible presence of buildings on that side – underneath a portico supported by twin columns. The portico had a limestone paved floor, whitewashed walls, and limestone bases which held the two columns. The bases have been retained, but the columns themselves – possibly manufactured from wood – have not been preserved. The remains of a diorite statue of Khafre were found near the doorway of the temple, brought here at some later time.

Through the doorway lay a vestibule with a roof supported by four columns. The column's bases built of alabaster were found in situ, but the columns they held have been lost. The walls were given simple colour washes: whitewash in the upper section, and black for the dado with a red upper trim. A limestone incense burner, and fragments of two schist statuettes, one belonging to a king and the other in the form of a sphinx, were found inside the vestibule, along with several other objects. To the south, a doorway led into the court.

The court, measuring 10.5 m (34 ft; 20.0 cu) by 9.9 m (32 ft; 18.9 cu), was paved with mudbrick save for a limestone pathway leading south-west from the doorway, under the wall, and into the vestibule of Menkaure's temple. There was originally a doorway into the temple, but this was bricked up during the construction of Khentkaus' temple. North-west of the courtyard was an elongated storage room, and to the east a long corridor with two, later three, entrances. The corridor was converted into a set of three dwellings, as was the southern half of the temple beyond the court.

North-west of the valley temple was a rectangular 6.05 m (19.8 ft) by 3.1 m (10 ft) mudbrick building, called the "Washing-tent" by Hassan. The building was used in the purification process before Khentkaus' corpse was transported through the necropolis to the embalming house. The chamber was found filled with debris, containing copious fragments of stone vessels, potsherds, and flint instruments. A covered, sloped white limestone drain was carved into the floor of the chamber, leading north for 7.2 m (24 ft) where it terminated into a large, rectangular stepped-basin. The first two steps of the basin were constructed from rubble with plaster, with the top step measuring 9.68 m (31.8 ft) by 1.6 m (5.2 ft). The third, and bottom, step was built from limestone and measured 8.8 m (29 ft) by 0.8 m (2.6 ft).

== See also ==
- Egyptian pyramid construction techniques
- List of Egyptian pyramids
- Lepsius list of pyramids

== Sources ==
- Hassan, Selim (1943). Excavations at Giza (1932–1933). Vol. 4. Cairo: Faculty of Arts of the Egyptian University. OCLC 645004242.
- Hölscher, Uvo (1912). Das Grabdenkmal des Königs Chephren (in German). Leipzig: Hinrichs. doi:10.11588/diglit.26793. OCLC 15927607.
- Lauer, Jean-Philippe (1962). L'Histoire monumentale des pyramides d'Egypte. Bibliothèque générale (Institut français d'archéologie orientale du Caire) (in French). Vol. 1. Le Caire: l'Institut français d'archéologie orientale. OCLC 18402034.
- Lehner, Mark (2008). The Complete Pyramids. New York: Thames & Hudson. ISBN 978-0-500-28547-3.
- Lehner, Mark; Jones, Daniel; Yeomans, Lisa; Mahmoud, Hanan; Olchowska, Kasia (2011). "Re-examining the Khentkaues Town". In Strudwick, Nigel; Strudwick, Helen (eds.). Old Kingdom, New Perspectives: Egyptian Art and Archaeology, 2750-2150 BC. Oxford: Oxbow Books. pp. 143–191. ISBN 9781842174302.
- Lepsius, Karl Richard (1970) [1849]. Denkmäler aus Ägypten und Äthiopen (in German). Osnabruck: Biblio Verlag. OCLC 13836851.
- Peck, William H. (2001). "Lepsius, Karl Richard". In Redford, Donald B. (ed.). The Oxford Encyclopedia of Ancient Egypt, Volume 2. Oxford: Oxford University Press. pp. 289–290. ISBN 978-0-19-510234-5.
- Stadelmann, Rainer (2001). "Giza". In Redford, Donald B. (ed.). The Oxford Encyclopedia of Ancient Egypt, Volume 2. Oxford: Oxford University Press. pp. 25–30. ISBN 978-0-19-510234-5.
- Verner, Miroslav (2001). The Pyramids: The Mystery, Culture and Science of Egypt's Great Monuments. New York: Grove Press. ISBN 978-0-8021-1703-8.
- Verner, Miroslav (2015). "The miraculous rise of the Fifth Dynasty – The story of Papyrus Westcar and historical evidence". Prague Egyptological Studies (XV): 86–92. ISSN 1214-3189.
