= Sekhemkare (vizier) =

- Vizier of Egypt
Egyptian name
r a s sxm kASḫm kꜣ Rꜥ
- Tenure: c. 2490 BC
- Pharaoh: Userkaf; Sahure
- Burial: Giza, Giza Governorate, Egypt
- Father: Khafre
- Mother: Hekenuhedjet
- Children: Sekhemkare; Horkhaf; Khafre-ankh; Khafre-bab

Sekhemkare (fl. c. 2490 BC) was a vizier from the Fifth Dynasty of Egypt. He was a son of king Khafre and queen Hekenuhedjet. He served as vizier during the beginning of the next dynasty, during the reigns of Userkaf and Sahure. Sekhemkare is the only son of Khafre whose death can be fairly securely dated to a precise reign, here that of Sahure.

== Family ==
Sekhemkare was the son of Khafre and Hekenuhedjet, who are both mentioned in his tomb. A number of offspring are also mentioned:

- Sekhemkare II, the eldest son and royal acquaintance.
- Horkhaf, son and royal acquaintance.
- Khafre-ankh, son and royal acquaintance.
- Khafre-bab, son and royal acquaintance.

== Tomb ==
The tomb of Sekhemkare is known as G 8154 (= LG 89), located in the Central Field which is part of the Giza Necropolis. His tomb is located to the southwest of that of his brother Nikaure and to the northwest of the tombs of Niuserre and Niankhre. The rock-cut tomb is situated to the northwest of the complex of Queen Khentkaus I and southeast of the Pyramid of Khafre.

On the doorjambs at the tomb entrance Sekhemkare is identified as "the king's son of his body, hereditary prince, count, councilor, sealer of the king of Lower Egypt, chief lector-priest of his father, sole companion, secretary of the House of Morning, assistant of (the god) Duau, secretary of his father". In other scenes he has the additional titles of chief justice and vizier and director of the palace. In one of the rooms an inscription records his career at court during the reigns of successive kings:

- revered before his father the king, before the Great God, before the king of Upper and Lower Egypt Khafre
- before the king of Upper and Lower Egypt Menkaure
- before the king of Upper and Lower Egypt Shepseskaf
- before the king of Upper and Lower Egypt Userkaf
- before the king of Upper and Lower Egypt Sahure

== Ancestry ==
Ancestors of Sekhemkare (vizier)

Khufu
Khafre
Sekhemkare
Hekenuhedjet
