= Bunefer =

Ancient Egyptian queen

b nfr f r
B(w)-nfr

Queen consort of Egypt
- Tenure: c. 2500 BC
- Died: Aged c. 35
- Burial: Giza, Giza Governorate, Egypt
- Religion: Ancient Egyptian Religion

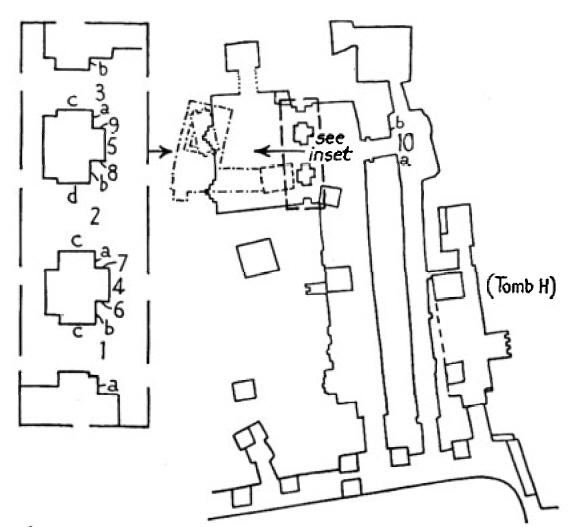
Tomb of Bunefer

Bunefer (fl. c. 2500 BC) was an ancient Egyptian queen from the 4th or 5th dynasty. It is not known which king she was married to. Bunefer was buried in tomb G 8408 in the Central Field of the Giza Necropolis.

== Life ==
Bunefer's titles were preserved in her tomb in Giza: King’s wife (ḥmt-nisw), Great one of the hetes-sceptre (wrt-hetes), Great one of the hetes-sceptre of the two ladies (wrt-hetes-nbti), She who sees Horus and Seth (m33t-ḥrw-stẖ), King’s wife, his beloved (ḥmt-nisw mryt.f), King’s daughter of his body (z3t-niswt-nt-ẖt.f), Priestess of Hathor (ḥmt-ntr-ḥwt-ḥrw), Priestess of Tjazepef (ḥmt-ntr-t3-zp.f), Priestess of the Horus Shepsesket (ḥmt-ntr-hrw-špss-ht), and Beloved and revered priestess of Shepses-nebti (ḥmt-ntr-špss-nbti-mryt.f-im3ḫt.f).

Bunefer's titles as a priestess of Shepseskaf have led to the theory that Bunefer may have been a wife or daughter of Shepseskaf. Her tomb is located near the complex of Khentkaus I which further suggests she lived towards the end of the 4th or beginning of the 5th dynasty. It has also been suggested she was the wife of enigmatic king Thamphthis.

Janosi has pointed out that the construction of Bunefer's tomb dates to some time after the tomb of Khentkaus was constructed. But the precise date of that monument is similarly not clear. It seems that Bunefer's tomb is more likely to date to the 5th dynasty however.

== Burial ==
Bunefer's rock-cut tomb is located to the north of the funerary complex of Queen Khentkaus I in the central field. The facade of the tomb opens to the south and a large doorway leads to a large chapel. Off to the east, another doorway leads to the tomb. Bunefer's name and titles appear on the walls and the pillars of the room. A son is mentioned in one of the scenes, but he has the simple titles of judge and inspector of the scribes. The burial chamber of Bunefer contained a white limestone sarcophagus. Inside the sarcophagus, a female skull was found of a woman estimated to be in her mid thirties. It is possible this is Queen Bunefer's skull.
