= Shepseskaf =

Last Egyptian pharaoh of the 4th dynasty

- Shepseskhaf, Sebercherês, Σεβερχέρης, Severkeris
- Alabaster statue head of Shepseskaf, Grand Egyptian Museum

Pharaoh
- Reign: Duration uncertain, probably four years but possibly up to seven, in the late 26th to mid-25th century BC (Note: Proposed dates for the reign of Shepseskaf: 2523–2519 BC, ending 2510 BC, 2511–2506 BC, 2504–2500BC, 2503–2498 BC, ending 2494 BC, 2486–2479 BC, 2472–2467 BC, ending 2465 BC, 2462–2457 BC, 2461–2456 BC, 2442–2436 BC, 2441–2438 BC, 2441–2436 BC, ending 2435 BC, 2396–2392 BC. Radiocarbon studies have yielded the following intervals for Shepseskaf's date of accession to the throne: 2538–2498 BC with 68% probability, 2556–2476 BC with 95% probability. These studies are based archaeological samples to measure fluctuations in radiocarbon activity, specific information on radiocarbon activity in the region of the Nile Valley (anchored by dendrochronology to absolute dates), direct linkages between the dated samples and historical chronology and relative dating information. Samples dated to specific reigns were collected from museum collections and excavation material while certain types of material (notably charcoal and mummified remains) were avoided owing to their susceptibility to contamination.)
- Predecessor: Menkaure
- Successor: Userkaf (most likely) or Thamphthis
Royal titulary
Horus name
- Hor-Shepsekhet
- Ḥr-špṣ-ḫt
- Horus, noble of body
G5	A50 F32
Nebty name
- Shepse-Nebty
- Nbt.j-špṣ
- The noble one of the two Ladies
- G16 A50
Prenomen
- Shepseskaf
- špṣṣ-k3.f
- His (Note: The word "his" here may refer to the god Ra rather than to the pharaoh.) Ka is noble
- M23 t L2 t < A50 S29 S29 D28 I9 >
- Abydos King List
- Shepseskaf
- špṣṣ-k3.f
- His Ka is noble
- < A50 O34 O34 D28 I9 >
- Turin King List
- No name readable, four years of reign
- < HASH HASH HASH > G7 HASH M4 X1 N33 Z1 Z1 Z1 Z1
- Consorts: Uncertain; Khentkaus I or Bunefer
- Children: Possibly Bunefer (♀), conjecturally Userkaf (♂)
- Father: Menkaure (uncertain)
- Mother: Uncertain; Khamerernebty II, Rekhetre, Khentkaus I or Neferhetepes
- Burial: Mastabat al-Fir'aun
- Monuments: Completion of the temple complex of Menkaure's pyramid, mastabat al-Fir'aun
- Dynasty: Fourth Dynasty

Shepseskaf (meaning "His Ka is noble") was a pharaoh of ancient Egypt, the sixth and probably last ruler of the Fourth Dynasty during the Old Kingdom period. He reigned most probably for four but possibly up to seven years in the late 26th to mid-25th century BC.

Shepseskaf's relation to his predecessor Menkaure is not entirely certain; he might have been his son or possibly his brother. The identity of his mother is highly uncertain as she could have been one of Menkaure's consorts or queen Khentkaus I or Neferhetepes. Similarly, Shepseskaf's relation to his probable successor on the throne, Userkaf, is not known although in the absence of clear indication of strife at the transition between the fourth and fifth dynasties, Userkaf could well have been his son or his brother. If Shepseskaf was succeeded directly by Userkaf rather than by Thampthis as claimed by some historical sources, then his death marks the end of the fourth dynasty. The transition to the fifth dynasty seems not to have been a sharp rupture but rather a continuous process of evolution in the king's power and role within the Egyptian state. Around this time, some of the highest positions of power such as that of vizier which had hitherto been the prerogative of the royal family were opened to nobles of non-royal extraction.

The only activities firmly datable to Shepseskaf's short reign are the completion of the hitherto unfinished mortuary complex of his Pyramid of Menkaure using mudbricks and the construction of his own tomb at South Saqqara, now known as the Mastabat al-Fir'aun. Shepseskaf's decisions to abandon the Giza necropolis and to build a mastaba, that is a flat-roofed rectangular structure, rather than a pyramid for himself are significant and continue to be debated. Some Egyptologists see these decisions as symptoms of a power-struggle between the king and the priesthood of Ra, while others believe purely practical considerations, possibly including a declining economy and the need to complete Menkaure's pyramid, are at fault. Alternatively, it may be that Shepseskaf intended his tomb to be a pyramid, but after his death it was completed as a mastaba. Possibly because of this, and the small dimensions of his tomb compared to those of his forebears and his short reign, Shepseskaf was the object of a relatively minor state-sponsored funerary cult that disappeared in the second half of the fifth dynasty. This cult was revived in the later Middle Kingdom period as a privately run lucrative cult aimed at guaranteeing a royal intercessor for the offerings made to their dead by members of the lower strata of society.

== Family ==
=== Parents ===
The relationship between Shepseskaf and his predecessor Menkaure is not entirely certain. The dominant view in modern Egyptology was first expounded by George Andrew Reisner who proposed that Shepseskaf was Menkaure's son. Reisner based his hypothesis on a decree showing that Shepseskaf completed Menkaure's mortuary temple. This hypothesis is shared by many Egyptologists including Aidan Dodson and Dyan Hilton, Rainer Stadelmann and Peter Clayton. Peter Jánosi nonetheless remarks that the decree does not constitute irrefutable proof of filiation since it does not describe the relationship between these two kings explicitly. (Note: Direct father-son relationships between Old Kingdom pharaohs are never explicitly reported in contemporary documents. Furthermore, no official title is known to have designated the crown prince before his accession to the throne. This makes such relationships difficult to assert beyond doubt from purely archaeological evidence.) In particular, the completion of the tomb of a deceased pharaoh by his successor does not necessarily depend on a direct father/son relation between the two. A possible alternative proposed by Miroslav Verner is that Menkaure and Shepseskaf could have been brothers, and the latter's consequently advanced age when ascending to the throne could explain his short reign. In contrast with these hypotheses, Egyptologists Ludwig Borchardt and William C. Hayes posited that Shepseskaf could have been of non-royal extraction and took the throne only thanks to his marriage to queen Khentkaus I.

The identity of Shepseskaf's mother is even more uncertain than that of his father. If the latter was Menkaure, then Shepseskaf's mother could have been one of Menkaure's royal wives Khamerernebty II, Rekhetre or a secondary wife. Alternatively Miroslav Bárta believes that Khentkaus I may have been Shepseskaf's mother and also the mother of his successor Userkaf. (Note: Of particular importance is an unusual title of Khentkaus I which seems to indicate that she was the mother of two kings.) Indeed, a close relationship between Shepseskaf and Khentkaus I has been inferred by Egyptologist Selim Hassan based on the "immense conformity" of their tombs, an opinion that is widely shared, yet what this relationship was remains unclear. Khentkaus I may instead have been the wife or the daughter of Shepseskaf. One more possibility was put forth by Arielle Kozloff, who proposed instead that it was Neferhetepes, a daughter of Djedefre, who was Shepseskaf's mother. For Egyptologist Vivienne Gae Callender there is no evidence in support of this hypothesis.

=== Queens and children ===
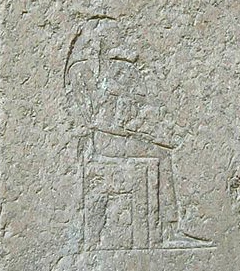
Portrait of Khentkaus I from her tomb

Inscriptions in queen Bunefer's Giza tomb (Note: Buried in Giza tomb G8408, she bore the title of njswt sA.t n Xt f, meaning "royal daughter of his body" but her father's identity remains in doubt.) demonstrate that she is related to Shepseskaf: she notably bore the title of "Great of praise, priestess of King Shepseskaf, the king's wife, the great ornament, the great favourite". Lana Troy, an Egyptologist, deduces from this title that while she married a pharaoh, she served as a priestess in the funerary cult for her father (Note: She may have participated in his burial ceremonies.) and therefore must have been Shepseskaf's daughter and the consort of another unspecified king. Indeed, all priestesses serving in a king's funerary cult were princesses, daughters or granddaughters of that king. If this hypothesis is true, it makes Bunefer the only queen known from Ancient Egypt to have served in a mortuary cult. Exceptional circumstances could explain this observation, for example if there was no other suitable female descendant to officiate in Shepseskaf's cult after his death. Bunefer's mother could have been Khentkaus I whose tomb is located near Bunefer's so that Khentkaus I might have been a consort of Shepseskaf. Bunefer's royal husband may have been pharaoh Thamphthis, whose existence is uncertain however as he is not attested archaeologically (see below for a discussion).

Hassan, who excavated Bunefer's tomb, rejects the opinion that Bunefer was Shepseskaf's daughter. He notes that most of Bunefer's titles are wifely ones and stresses "the fact that the name of Shepseskaf appears in her tomb is in favour of the assumption that he was her husband". In any case Bunefer had at least one son, whose name is lost, and whose father was not a king according to this son's titles. He was possibly an issue from a second, non-royal, marriage of Bunefer.

Princess Khamaat married to the high priest of Ptah, Ptahshepses, and is known by her titles to have been the daughter of a king. She was long thought to be a daughter of Shepseskaf following a hypothesis by 19th-century Egyptologist Emmanuel de Rougé. A consensus was reached on this issue, but in 2002 Egyptologist Peter F. Dorman published inscriptions from Ptahshepses's tomb showing that she was Userkaf's daughter instead.

Finally, Mark Lehner proposes that Shepseskaf fathered pharaoh Userkaf with queen Khentkaus I, an idea shared by Kozloff but rejected by Bárta who thinks they were brothers. Alternatively, Khentkaus I has been conjectured to be Shepseskaf's daughter.

== Reign ==
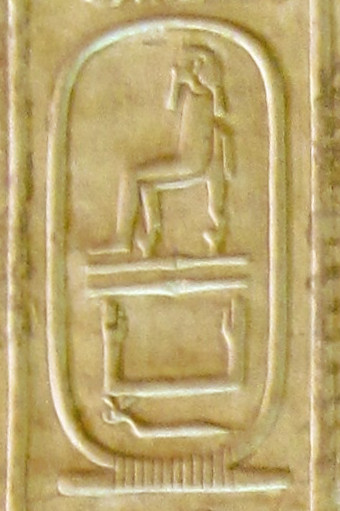
Cartouche of Shepseskaf on the Abydos king list

Shepseskaf's reign is difficult to date precisely in absolute terms. An absolute chronology referring to dates in the modern Western calendar is estimated by Egyptologists working backwards by adding reign lengths – themselves uncertain and inferred from historical sources and archaeological evidence – and, in a few cases, using ancient astronomical observations and radiocarbon dates. These methodologies do not agree perfectly and some uncertainty remains. As a result, Shepseskaf's rule is dated to some time around the late 26th to mid-25th century BC.

=== Relative chronology ===
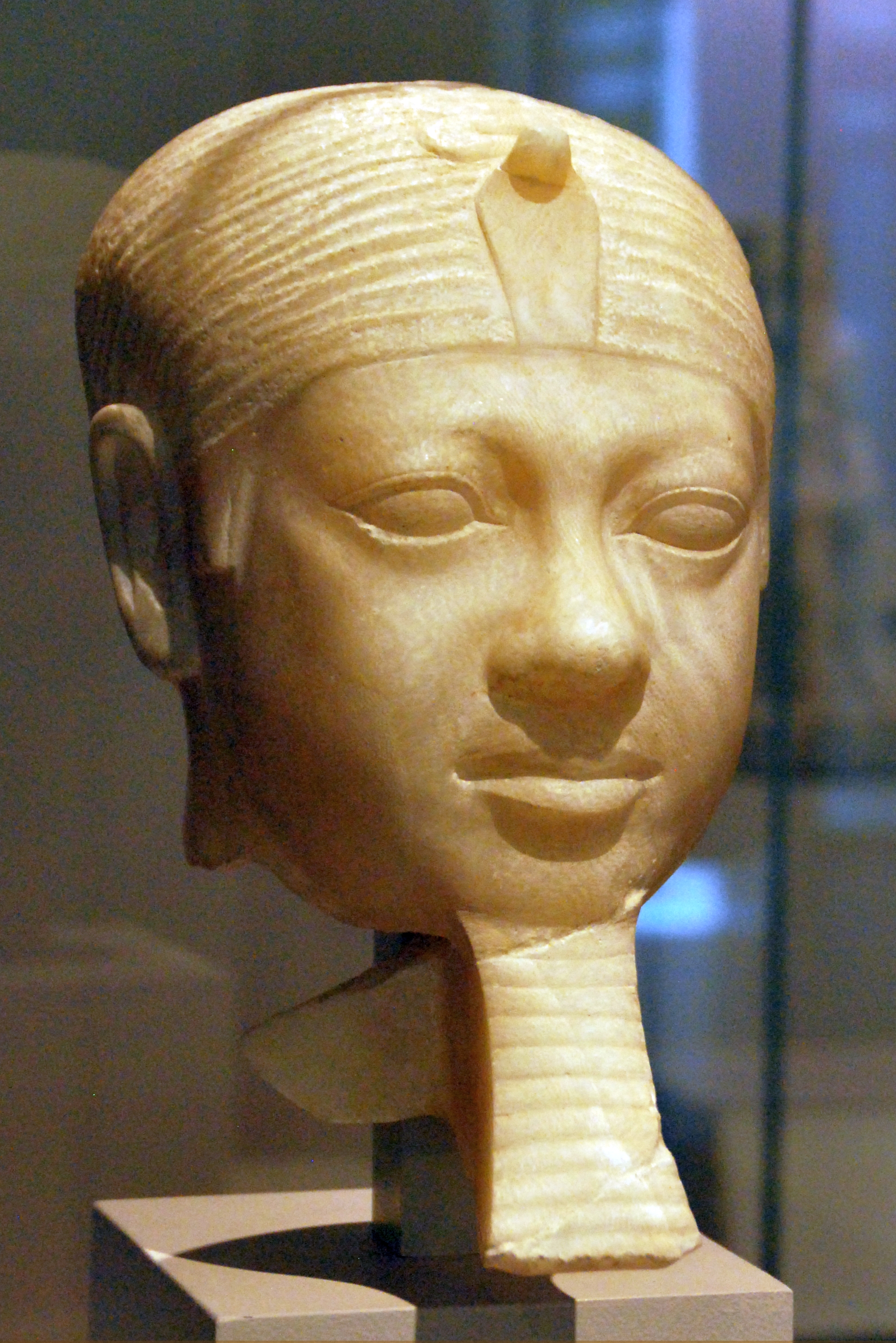
Statue head at the Boston Museum of Fine Arts believed to depict either Shepseskaf or Menkaure

The relative chronological position of Shepseskaf within the fourth dynasty is not entirely certain. The near contemporary (Note: Although the surviving fragments of the Palermo stone itself probably date to the much later 25th dynasty (fl. 760–656 BC), they were certainly copied or compiled from Old Kingdom sources. These themselves date to the first half of the fifth dynasty, possibly under Neferirkare's rule, as the annals record no event after that. In addition, Patrick O'Mara has shown that the Old Kingdom source itself used earlier royal annals probably first written in the time span between Menkaure's and Userkaf's reigns, i.e. possibly during Shepseskaf's.) fifth dynasty royal annals now known as the Palermo stone indicates unambiguously (Note: This part of the Palermo stone is actually ascribed to the Early Dynastic Period, specifically the transition between Aha and Djer.) that he succeeded Menkaure on the throne and was crowned on the 11th day of the fourth month. The identity of his successor is less certain. Archaeological evidence seems to indicate that Shepseskaf was succeeded directly by Userkaf. In particular, no intervening king is mentioned on the tombs of officials who served at the time. For example, an inscription in the tomb of the palace courtier Netjerpunesut gives the following sequence of kings he served under: Djedefre → Khafre → Menkaure → Shepseskaf → Userkaf → Sahure → Neferirkare. Similarly, in his Giza tomb prince Sekhemkare reports about his career under the kings Khafre, Menkaura, Shepseskaf, Userkaf and Sahure, while the high priest Ptahshepses describes being born under Menkaure, growing up under Shepseskaf and starting his career under Userkaf. Furthermore, Egyptologist Patrick O'Mara underlines that "no names of estates of the period [which are] compounded with royal names make mention of any other kings than these, nor do the names of [...] royal grandchildren, who often bore the name of a royal ancestor as a component of their own [name]." This reconstruction of late fourth to early fifth dynasty is also in agreement with that given on the Abydos king list written during the reigns of Seti I (c. 1292–1279 BC), where Shepseskaf's cartouche is on the 25th entry between those of Menkaure and Userkaf.

Three historical sources go directly or indirectly against this order of succession. The source in direct contradiction is the Aegyptiaca (Αἰγυπτιακά), a history of Egypt written in the 3rd century BC during the reign of Ptolemy II (283–246 BC) by Manetho. No copies of the Aegyptiaca have survived and it is now known only through later writings by Sextus Julius Africanus and Eusebius. According to the Byzantine scholar George Syncellus, Africanus wrote that the Aegyptiaca mentioned the succession "Bicheris → Sebercherês → Thamphthis" at the end of the fourth dynasty while "Usercherês" is given as the fifth dynasty's first king. Sebercherês (in Greek, Σεβερχέρης) and Usercherês are believed to be the Hellenised forms for Shepeseskaf and Userkaf, respectively, while the identities of Bicheris and Thampthis are unknown. They could refer to shadowy figures, perhaps the fourth dynasty prince Baka in the case of Bicheris and Thampthis could originate from the Egyptian name Djedefptah, or they could both be fictitious rulers. That a king might have reigned between Shepseskaf and Userkaf is also indirectly supported by the Turin canon, a king list written during the 19th dynasty in the early Ramesside era (1292–1189 BC). The canon, written on papyrus is damaged at several spots and thus many royal names are either fragmentary or completely lost in lacunae today. In column III, line 15 King Shepseskaf is listed, line 16 is wholly in a lacuna while the end of Userkaf's name is legible on line 17. The missing line 16 must have originally held the royal name of Shepseskaf's unknown successor. The Saqqara Tablet, written under Ramses II (c. 1303–1213 BC), also seems to have mentioned an unknown successor for Shepseskaf as it originally listed nine cartouches corresponding to fourth dynasty kings, when only six are otherwise known from archaeological evidence (Sneferu, Khufu, Djedefre, Khafra, Menkaure and Shepseskaf). The five cartouches between those of Khafre and Userkaf are now illegible.

For Egyptologist Nigel Strudwick, the uncertainty regarding Shepseskaf's successor and the presence of further shadowy rulers in historical sources during the late fourth dynasty point to some family instability at the time.

=== Duration ===
The duration of Shepseskaf's rule is uncertain but it is generally taken to have lasted probably four but perhaps up to seven years. Explicit archaeological evidence on this matter is reduced to six documents. Four of these are inscriptions dated to the year of his accession to the throne, three found in tombs of the Giza necropolis and one from the Palermo stone. The last two contemporary inscriptions mention his second regnal year, (Note: During the Old Kingdom period, the Egyptians did not record time as we do today. Rather, they counted years since the beginning of the reign of the current king. Furthermore these years were referred to by the number of cattle counts which had taken place since the start of the reign. The cattle count was an important event aimed at evaluating the amount of taxes to be levied on the population. This involved counting cattle, oxen and small livestock. During the first half of the fifth dynasty, this count might have been biennial although it may not always have happened at regular intervals. Following these principles, these inscriptions talk of the year after the first cattle count of Shepseskaf's reign. If the count was indeed biennial, which is uncertain, this would correspond to his second regnal year.) one of which is found on the decree of Shepseskaf concerning Menkaure's pyramid town.

Two historical sources report the duration of Shepseskaf's reign. The Turin canon credits him with a reign of four years, while Manetho's Aegyptiaca gives him seven years on the throne. Although this figure is compatible with the Palermo stone which may have had up to seven compartments relating Shepseskaf's reign according to Georges Daressy, this is considered an overestimate according to modern consensus. Verner points notably to the unfinished state of his mastaba to conclude Shepseskaf's rule did not exceed the four years attributed to him by the Turin canon. (Note: A mastaba takes time to build and the unfinished state of the tomb gives some indication on the reign duration as works on the royal tomb started in the king's first year of reign and either stopped or were interrupted at the death of the king. Depending on the final state of the originally planned tomb one can thus estimate on the maximum duration of the king's reign. Had Shepseskaf reigned longer than four years, his mastaba would have been more advanced at his death than it is, according to Verner.) A reappraisal of the Palermo stone by Jürgen von Beckerath limits the space available on it for Shepseskaf's rule to five or six compartments, corresponding to that many years. Manetho's count may be explained by a conflation of the four full years attributed to Shepseskaf by the Turin king list plus two full years and a significant monthly fraction credited to his anonymous successor on that list. This successor could correspond to Manetho's Thampthis, to whom Manetho gives nine years of reign, although as observed by Verner archaeological evidence for this ruler is nil.

=== Activities ===
Very few activities of Shepseskaf are known. The pharaoh's bench, or (mastabat El fara'un). The Palermo stone reports that in the year of his accession to the throne he participated in the "going around the Two Lands" and a "festival of the diadem" during which two images of the god Wepwawet were fashioned and the gods who unite the two lands are said to have followed the king. These events occurred at or close to the coronation of the king. The site of Shepseskaf's tomb, said to be a pyramid, was chosen that same year. On that occasion, an enclosure of Lebanese wood may have been set up to surround the perimeter of the part of the Saqqara necropolis where the tomb was to be constructed. Finally Shepseskaf probably decreed a daily offering of 20 measures of something (what was offered is lost in a lacuna of the stone) to the senuti shrine. (Note: Senuti shrine, transliteration snwt. This might designate a building perhaps marked by snake stelae, possibly at Heliopolis.)

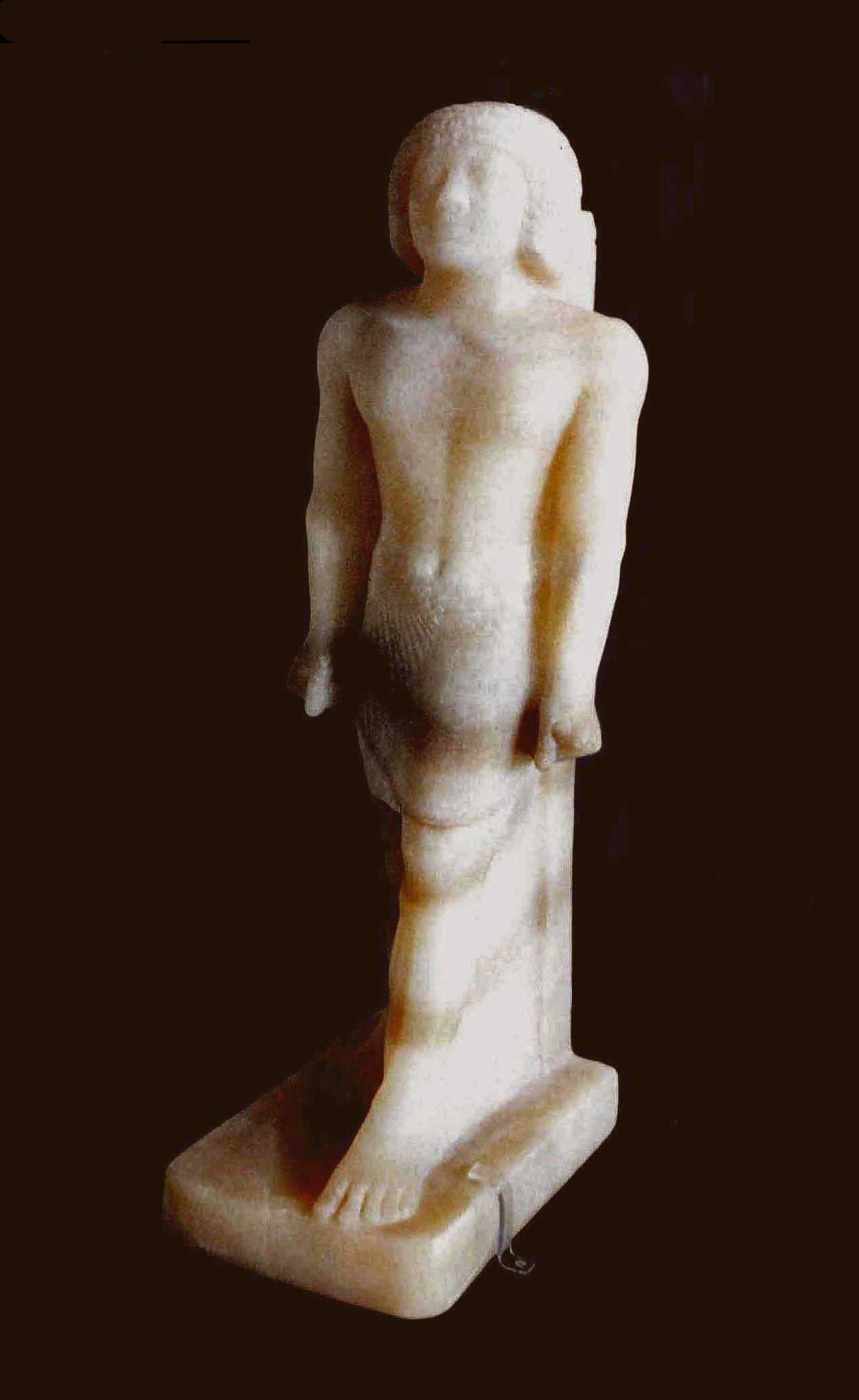
Alabaster statuette of Babaef II, a vizier of Shepseskaf, from his Giza tomb G5230, now in the Kunsthistorisches Museum, Wien

It was during his second year of rule that Shepseskaf recorded the earliest surviving decree from the Old Kingdom period. Inscribed on a limestone slab uncovered in Menkaure's mortuary temple, the decree concerns the completion of this temple, records offerings to be made there and protects the estate and staff of the pyramid of Menkaure by exempting them from taxation: (Note: The decree, now fragmentary and damaged, is currently housed in the Egyptian Museum under the temporary number 26.2.21.18.)

Horus Shepsesket, the year after the first occasion of the count of cattle and herds [...] which was done in the presence of the King himself. The King of Upper and Lower Egypt Shepseskaf. For the king of Upper and Lower Egypt [Menkaure] he set up a monument, a pekher offering [...] in the pyramid of Menkaure [...] With regard to the pekher offering brought for the king of Upper and Lower Egypt [Menkaure] [...] priestly duty [is done] with respect to it for ever. [...] [it should never be taken away by someone] in the course of his duty for ever [...] the pyramid of Menkaure [...]. My majesty does not permit [...] servants [...] priests [...]

Excavations of Menkaure's mortuary temple confirm that it was probably left unfinished at this pharaoh's death. Originally planned to be made of granite, then altered to be completed of white Turah limestone, all stone construction ceased and the temple was hastily finished in crude bricks during Shepseskaf's rule. This material allows for rapid construction. Shepseskaf's works concerned the causeway and entrance corridors of the temple, its great open court, storerooms and inner temple as well as the exterior walls. All brick constructions were covered in yellow mud then plastered white and left plain, except for the walls of the great open court which were made into a system of niches. The completed doorways were fitted with wooden doors and the temple floors were of beaten mud on packed limestone chips, while the great court received a stone flooring.

Further activities are reported in Herodotus' account of the late fourth dynasty. According to Herodotus, Menkaure was succeeded by a king, whom he calls Asukhis, (Note: Also called Aseskaf or Asychis -- Ἄσυχις in Greek.) who built an outer court of Hephaestus's (Ptah's) temple, decreed a new law on borrowing to remedy the lack of money in circulation during his reign and built a brick pyramid. (Note: Herodotus's account is as follows: "After Mycerinus, the priests said, Asukhis became king of Egypt. He built the eastern outer court of Hephaestus's temple; this is by far the finest and grandest of all the courts, for while all have carved figures and innumerable felicities of architecture, this court has far more than any. As not much money was in circulation during this king's reign, they told me, a law was made for the Egyptians' allowing a man to borrow on the security of his father's corpse; and the law also provided that the lender become master of the entire burial-vault of the borrower, and that the penalty for one giving this security, should he fail to repay the loan, was that he was not to be buried at his death either in that tomb of his fathers or in any other, nor was he to bury any relative of his there. Furthermore, in his desire to excel all who ruled Egypt before him, this king left a pyramid of brick to commemorate his name, on which is this writing, cut on a stone: 'Do not think me less than pyramids of stone; for I excel them as much as Zeus does other gods; for they stuck a pole down into a marsh and collected what mud clung to the pole, made bricks of it, and thus built me.' These were the acts of Asukhis.") Herodotus's account cannot easily be reconciled with the historical reality and seems to stem from confusion between fourth and 24th dynasty rulers, garbled references to legends regarding a second dynasty king as lawgiver and 12th dynasty brick pyramids of Dahshur, such as that of Amenemhat III. As Diodorus Siculus makes similar mistakes in reporting the history of the fourth dynasty – notably, both he and Herodotus incorrectly believed the fourth dynasty came after the 20th – it is possible that it was their sources in Egypt which were at fault.

=== Court life ===
Some of the officials who served under Shepseskaf are known from the funerary inscriptions they made on their tombs and which mention the king. These are mostly found in Giza and Saqqara. The fact that many of these inscriptions only mention Shepseskaf without further details hints at the short duration of his reign. The court officials who mentioned Shepseskaf include Babaef II, vizier under Shepseskaf and possibly his cousin; Sekhemkare, a son of Khafre, priest of the royal funerary cults; (Note: His mastaba, located in Giza and now known as G8154 yielded a list of the kings under whom he served, from Khafre down to Sahure.) Nisutpunetjer, who was a priest of the royal funerary cults; (Note: His mastaba is now known as Giza tomb G8740.) Ptahshepses I who was educated among the royal children in Shepseskaf's palace and harem, later promoted to the office of priest of Ptah by Userkaf and son-in-law of this pharaoh; and Kaunisut, a palace official, priest and director of hairdressers.

=== End of dynasty ===
The division of ancient Egyptian kings into dynasties is an invention of Manetho's Aegyptiaca, intended to adhere more closely to the expectations of Manetho's patrons, the Greek rulers of Ptolemaic Egypt. The historical reality of these dynasties is difficult to appraise and they might not correspond to the modern conception for that term: for example Djoser, the first king of the third dynasty, was the son of Khasekhemwy, final king of the Second dynasty. (Note: To quote Stadelmann on the subject: "With Userkaf, Manetho begins a new dynasty. Recent historical research, however, suggests that the delimitation of king lists into dynasties should be viewed with a certain reserve. In any case, the reason for the Manethonian division into dynasties seems to be different from that which modern historians would take as a basis. The sparse, almost exclusively archaeological knowledge of the monuments simply does not allow any clear statements as to the extent to which such dynasties actually do justice to the historical reality of the Old Kingdom.") Stadelmann and Bárta remark that Shepseskaf (which means "His Ka is noble") and Userkaf have much in common, for example their throne names both follow the same pattern qualifying the Ka of Ra as "noble" for the former and "strong" for the later and they probably belonged to the same family with Userkaf being either Shepseskaf's son or his brother. In addition, the biographies of officials serving at the time show no break in their careers at the juncture of the fourth and fifth dynasties and no traces of religious, political or economic upheavals at the time. (Note: For Jéquier though, the very fact that Shepseskaf had a mastaba built for himself rather than a pyramid could be evidence of such troubles.)

Some distinction between the fourth and fifth dynasties may nonetheless have been recognised by the ancient Egyptians, as recorded by a tradition much older (Note: This tale dates to the 17th (fl. c. 16th century BC) or possibly the 12th dynasty (fl. c. 19th century BC).) than Manetho's and found in the tale of the Westcar Papyrus. In this story, King Khufu is foretold the demise of his line and the rise of a new dynasty through the accession of three sons of Ra to the throne of Egypt. (Note: In the tale the first three kings of the fifth dynasty are said to be brothers but it is now known thanks to archaeological evidences that Userkaf, Sahure and Neferirkare Kakai had father-son relationships with one another.)

In modern Egyptology no sharp division is understood to have taken place between the fourth and fifth dynasties. Yet some transition between them is perceived through the evolution of the Egyptian state at the time, from one where all power and positions of prestige were taken by the royal family, to one where the state-administration was opened to people of non-royal descent. It is in the interval from Menkaure to Userkaf that the royal family began to step back from the highest offices, in particular that of the vizier. Shepseskaf, Userkaf and their fifth dynasty successors responded to these changes by designing new means of asserting their supremacy and religious influence, through the cult of Ra, the creation of novel offices of state and changes in the king's role. Ra's primacy over the rest of the Egyptian pantheon and the increased royal devotion given to him made Ra a sort of state-god, a novelty in comparison with the earlier fourth dynasty, when more emphasis was put on royal burials.

== Burial ==
Shepseskaf's tomb is a great mastaba at South Saqqara. Called Qbḥ-Špss-k3.f ("Qebeh Shepseskaf") by the ancient Egyptians, this name is variously translated as "Shepseskaf is pure", "Shepseskaf is purified", "Coolness of King Shepseskaf" and "The cool place of Shepseskaf". Nowadays it is known as Mastabat al-Fir'aun, meaning "bench of the pharaoh" in Egyptian Arabic. This mastaba was first recognised as such by Richard Lepsius who listed it as structure XLIII in his pioneering list of pyramids. First excavated in 1858 by Auguste Mariette, it was not before the years 1924–1925 that the mastaba was thoroughly explored by Gustave Jéquier.

=== Location ===
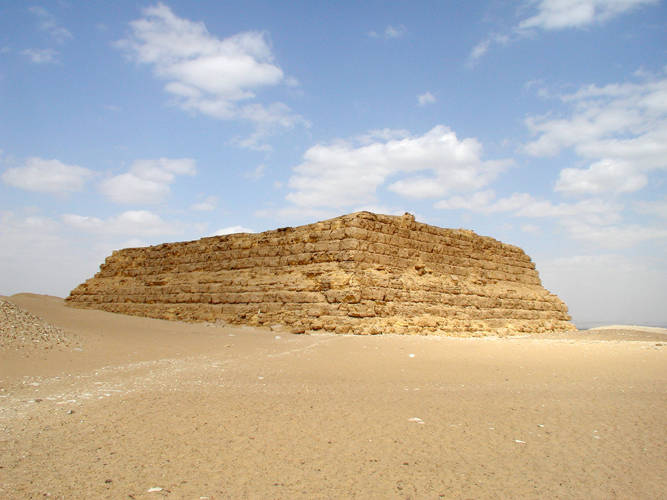
Mastabat al-Fir’aun, Saqqara

Shepseskaf's decision to be buried in South Saqqara represents a departure from the Giza necropolis used by his predecessors. The reason for this choice is debated. Verner remarks that this choice had political symbolism as it allowed Shepseskaf a greater proximity to the dynasty founder Sneferu's red and bent pyramids in Dahshur, possibly emphasising his belonging to the dynastic line. For Bárta, Shepseskaf simply decided to come back to the traditional burial grounds of Saqqara and Abusir, a choice that therefore does not need to be seen as a sign of religious conflicts within the royal family, as had been proposed by Hassan.

However, the main reason might have been economic or practical rather than political or religious. There was simply not enough space left in Giza for another large pyramid complex, and the proximity of limestone quarries to South Saqqara could have played a role. Egyptologist Adolf Erman instead conjectures that the choice of location for a pharaoh's tomb was mostly dictated by the vicinity of his palace which could change owing to economic, political and military interests. This remains unverified as no palace of an Old Kingdom king has been located so far, and it may be instead that it was the centre of the administration and royal house which followed the funerary complex rather than the other way around.

=== Decision to build a mastaba ===
As Shepseskaf chose to have a mastaba built for himself, he broke with the fourth dynasty tradition of constructing pyramids. Several theories have been put forth to explain this choice. First, Verner hypothesises that Shepseskaf may have designed a mastaba as a temporary measure because he was faced with the arduous task of completing Menkaure's pyramid complex at Giza while simultaneously having to start his own tomb. In this theory, Shepseskaf may have intended to turn the mastaba into a pyramid at a later stage. In support of this theory is the observation that the architecture and layout of the subterranean structures of the mastaba exactly follow the standard plan for royal pyramids. Shepseskaf might have been forced to take this decision if Egypt experienced economic difficulties at the time as Verner posits, or perhaps Menkaure's failure to complete his mortuary temple could have made Shepseskaf more cautious about his own tomb.

At the opposite, Egyptologist Stephen Quirke believes that Shepseskaf's tomb amounts to the first step of a planned step pyramid that was unfinished owing to its owner's early death, only to be completed by his successor or his queen in the shape of a mastaba. This theory finds some support in the Palermo stone which indicates that the emplacement and name of Shepseskaf's tomb were chosen during his first year on the throne. In this text the name of the tomb is written with the determinative of a pyramid rather than that of a mastaba, but in the tomb of Nikauhor, who worked as overseer of Shepseskaf's tomb, it appears with the determinative of a mastaba. (Note: Janák, Vymazalová and Coppens note in passing that this sign could be "a schematic depiction of the mastaba-like tomb [...] of pharaoh Shepseskaf".)

Alternatively, Hassan has put forward the idea that Shepseskaf may have deliberately chosen to build a mastaba owing to religio-political reasons, as the pyramid shape is closely associated with the solar cult. (Note: Verner is explicitly against this hypothesis, qualifying it as "erroneous".) In doing so he would have tried to undermine the growing influence of the priesthood of Ra. This hypothesis could also explain the absence of a direct theophoric reference to Ra in his name as well as in that of his probable immediate successor Userkaf. (Note: Against this opinion Stadelmann thinks that the "Ka" in Shepseskaf's and Userkaf's names does refer to the soul of Ra.) Hassan, who believes Khentkaus I was Shepseskaf's consort, further conjectures that Khentkaus was forced to marry Userkaf, the high priest of Ra, after Shepseskaf's death. This marriage would have sealed the unrivalled ascendancy of the solar cult throughout the fifth dynasty. Egyptologist Jaromir Málek concurs in part with this hypothesis, seeing Shepseskaf's decision as the symptom of a possible religious crisis. The archaeologist Joyce Tyldesley notes that if Shepseskaf really did intend his tomb to be a mastaba and regardless of his motivations, this indicates that while a pyramid may be desirable, it was not an absolute necessity for a pharaoh to reach the afterlife.

In a fourth opinion, Bárta, who stresses that the reasons for Shepseskaf's choice largely elude us, nonetheless proposes that the king may have lacked full legitimacy after ascending the throne from his position of high official through marriage. In this hypothesis Shepseskaf would be a son of Khentkaus I. While in all probability related to the fourth dynasty royal family, he may not have had the legitimacy that prince Khuenre, the firstborn son of Menkaure and queen Khamerernebty II, had enjoyed prior to his death. Possibly faced with opponents and a state-administration increasingly from outside of the royal family, he could have chosen to build a non-typical tomb fitting his peculiar status.

=== Architecture ===
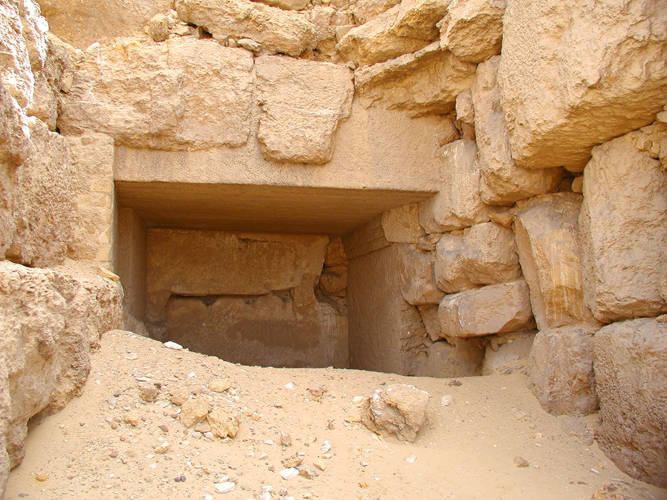
Entrance to the mastaba's subterranean chambers

The mastaba, oriented on a north–south axis, is rectangular in shape with a base of 99.6 m × 74.4 m (327 ft × 244 ft) and a height of 18 m (59 ft). The outer slope of its wall is 65° or 70° and it may have risen in two steps. The tomb dimensions are deemed very small and modest by Verner as compared with the great pyramids of Shepseskaf's fourth dynasty predecessors. Indeed, the total volume of the mastaba masonry represents no more than a third that of Menkaure's pyramid. For Verner and Egyptologist Abeer El-Shahawy, this could be explained by the decline in the economic prosperity of Egypt at the time as well as a decline in the king's power. At the opposite, for Stadelmann one should not conclude that political instability or economic difficulties prevented Menkaure, Shepseskaf and their successors from emulating the great pyramids of their forebears. Instead he proposes that the main impetus behind Menkaure's smaller pyramid and for Shepseskaf's decision to have a mastaba made for himself is a cultic change, where the pyramid is replaced as the centre of appearance and importance by the mortuary temple as the centre of the funerary ritual. In spite of its reduced size, Shepseskaf's tomb and funerary complex were probably unfinished at the death of the king, something which is taken to confirm a short reign. Excavations have shown that parts of the associated mortuary temple as well as the entirety of the causeway leading to it from the Nile valley have been "hastily" completed in mudbrick, probably by one of his successors.

The narrow ends of the mastaba were deliberately raised unlike the traditional fashion, making the tomb look like a great sarcophagus or the hieroglyphic determinative for a shrine. (Note: That is, the mastaba took the shape of a Buto shrine with a rounded vaulted top between vertical ends.) The mastaba was originally clad with white Turah limestone except for its lower course, which was clad in red granite. The entrance to the substructures is on the mastaba's northern face, from where a nearly 20.95 m (68.7 ft) long rock-cut passageway descends at 23°30' to an antechamber, the access to which was to be protected by three portcullises. To the southeast of the antechamber is a room with six niches, possibly storerooms, while west of the antechamber lies the burial chamber. Measuring 7.79 m × 3.85 m (25.6 ft × 12.6 ft) it is lined with granite and has a 4.9 m (16 ft) high arched ceiling sculpted into a false vault. Remnants of a decorated dark basalt sarcophagus were uncovered there although the burial chamber was never finished and in all probability never used.

The mastaba was surrounded by a double enclosure wall of mudbricks. On the eastern face of the tomb was a mortuary temple with an offering hall, false door and five storerooms, the layout of which later served as template for Neferirkare Kakai's temple. No niches meant to house statues of the king were found, although fragments of a statue of Shepseskaf in the style of those of Khafre and Menkaure were uncovered in the temple. To the east lay a small inner court and a larger outer one. Remnants of a causeway have been found; it is supposed to have led to a valley temple which has yet to be located.

== Legacy ==
=== Old Kingdom ===
Like other pharaohs of the fourth and fifth dynasties, Shepseskaf was the object of an official funerary cult after his death. This cult seems to have been relatively minor when compared to those given to his predecessors. Only three priests serving in this cult are known, including Shepseskaf's probable daughter queen Bunefer. This contrasts with the at least 73 and 21 priests known to have served in the cults of Khufu and Menkaure, respectively. Furthermore, no evidence for Shepseskaf's cult has been found beyond the mid fifth dynasty, while the cults of some of his close successors lasted beyond the end of the Old Kingdom. Provisions for these official mortuary cults were produced in agricultural estates set up during the ruler's reign. Possibly owing to the short duration of his reign only two such estates are known for Shepseskaf compared with at least sixty for Khufu.

In parallel to the official cult, it seems that Shepseskaf's name and memory were especially well regarded at least as late as the second half of the fifth dynasty as attested by at least seven high officials bearing the name Shepseskafankh, meaning "May Shepseskaf live" or "Shepseskaf lives", up until the reign of Nyuserre Ini. This includes a royal physician, a royal estate steward, a courtier, a priest, and a judicial official.

=== Middle Kingdom ===
While no trace of state-sponsored cult of Shepseskaf have been uncovered from the late Old Kingdom and First Intermediate periods, Jéquier discovered a Middle Kingdom stele during his excavations of Shepseskaf's mortuary temple. At that time, the vicinity of the mastaba had become a necropolis housing tombs from the lower strata of society. The stele uncovered by Jéquier probably originated from a nearby tomb and had been reused at a later time as paving for the temple floor. The stele indicates that some sort of popular cult had been revived by the 12th dynasty on the premises of the temple. Dedicated by a butcher named Ptahhotep, the stele depicts Ptahhotep and his family seemingly officiating a fully functioning cult, with its priests, scribes and servants. Contrary to the Old Kingdom state-sponsored cult honouring Shepseskaf, the main object of this cult was not Shepseskaf himself but the dead of the surrounding necropolis for whom people were making offerings, offerings which only the gods could give the dead after accepting them thanks to Shepseskaf's intercession. For Jéquier, this cult had been turned into a lucrative activity by Ptahhotep's family.

=== New Kingdom ===
Along with other royal monuments at Saqqara and Abusir which had fallen into ruin, Shepseskaf's mastaba was the object of restoration works under the impulse of prince Khaemwaset, a son of Ramses II. This was possibly to appropriate stones for his father's construction projects while ensuring a minimal restoration for cultic purposes.

== Bibliography ==
- Allen, James; Allen, Susan; Anderson, Julie; Arnold, Arnold; Arnold, Dorothea; Cherpion, Nadine; David, Élisabeth; Grimal, Nicolas; Grzymski, Krzysztof; Hawass, Zahi; Hill, Marsha; Jánosi, Peter; Labée-Toutée, Sophie; Labrousse, Audran; Lauer, Jean-Phillippe; Leclant, Jean; Der Manuelian, Peter; Millet, N. B.; Oppenheim, Adela; Craig Patch, Diana; Pischikova, Elena; Rigault, Patricia; Roehrig, Catharine H.; Wildung, Dietrich; Ziegler, Christiane (1999). Egyptian Art in the Age of the Pyramids. New York: The Metropolitan Museum of Art. OCLC 41431623.
- Baker, Darrell (2008). The Encyclopedia of the Pharaohs: Volume I – Predynastic to the Twentieth Dynasty 3300–1069 BC. London: Stacey International. ISBN 978-1-905299-37-9.
- Bard, Kathryn A. (1999). "Chronology of Ancient Egypt". In Bard, Kathryn A.; Blake Shubert, Steven (eds.). Encyclopedia of the Archeology of Ancient Egypt. New York: Routledge. pp. xliii–lii. ISBN 978-0-203-98283-9.
- Bárta, Miroslav (2016). "'Abusir Paradigm' and the Beginning of the Fifth Dynasty". In Hein, Irmgard; Billing, Nils; Meyer-Dietrich, Erika (eds.). The Pyramids between life and death : proceedings of the workshop held at Uppsala University, May 31st – June 1st, 2012. Acta Universitatis Upsaliensis. Boreas. Vol. 36. Uppsala: Uppsala Universitet. pp. 51–74. ISBN 978-9-15-549169-7.
- Bárta, Miroslav (2015). "Tomb of the chief physician Shepseskafankh". Prague Egyptological Studies. XV. Czech Institute of Egyptology: 15–27. ISSN 1801-3899.
- Bárta, Miroslav (2017). "Radjedef to the Eighth Dynasty". UCLA Encyclopedia of Egyptology. 1 (1). San Diego: The University of California.
- Bérard, Jean (1937). "Remarques sur une erreur historique d'Hérodote (II, 124-136)". Revue des Études Grecques (in French). 50 (236/237): 289–292. doi:10.3406/reg.1937.2823. JSTOR 44271513.
- Bogdanov, Ivan (2020). "The Old Kingdom evidence on the toponym ḫntj-š "Lebanon"". Ägypten und Levante / Egypt and the Levant. 29. Austrian Academy of Sciences Press: 125–148. doi:10.1553/AEundL29s125. JSTOR 26926564. S2CID 243567455.
- Breasted, James Henry (1906). Ancient records of Egypt historical documents from earliest times to the Persian conquest, collected edited and translated with commentary, vol. I The First to the Seventeenth Dynasties. Chicago: The University of Chicago Press. OCLC 491147601.
- Burkard, Günter; Thissen, Heinz Josef; Quack, Joachim Friedrich (2003). Einführung in die altägyptische Literaturgeschichte. Band 1: Altes und Mittleres Reich. Einführungen und Quellentexte zur Ägyptologie. Vol. 1, 3, 6. Münster: LIT. ISBN 978-3-82-580987-4.
- Callender, Vivienne Gae (1994). "Part III. A prosopographical register of the wives of the Egyptian Kings (Dynasties I–XVII)". The wives of the Egyptian kings: dynasties I–XVII. Sydney, Australia: Macquarie University. School of History, Philosophy, and Politics. OCLC 862671624. Archived from the original on 27 April 2022.
- Chauvet, Violaine (2001). "Saqqara". In Redford, Donald B. (ed.). The Oxford Encyclopedia of Ancient Egypt, Volume 3. Oxford: Oxford University Press. pp. 176–179. ISBN 978-0-19-510234-5.
- Clayton, Peter (1994). Chronicle of the Pharaohs. New York: Thames & Hudson. ISBN 978-0-500-05074-3.
- Daressy, Georges (1912). "La Pierre de Palerme et la chronologie de l'Ancien Empire". Bulletin de l'Institut Français d'Archéologie Orientale (in French). 12. Cairo: 161–214. doi:10.3406/bifao.1916.1736. ISSN 0255-0962.
- David, Ann Rosalie; David, Antony E (2001). A Biographical Dictionary of Ancient Egypt. London: Seaby. ISBN 978-1-85-264032-3.
- de Rougé, Emmanuel (1865). Recherches sur les monuments qu'on peut attribuer aux six premières dynasties de Manéthon (in French). Paris: Institut de France, Académie des inscriptions et belles-lettres. OCLC 1026731127.
- Dodson, Aidan; Hilton, Dyan (2004). The Complete Royal Families of Ancient Egypt. London: Thames & Hudson. ISBN 978-0-500-05128-3.
- Dorman, Peter (2002). "The biographical inscription of Ptahshepses from Saqqara: A newly identified fragment". Journal of Egyptian Archaeology. 88: 95–110. doi:10.1177/030751330208800107. JSTOR 3822338. S2CID 193353936.
- Dunham, Dows (1935). "Four New Kingdom Monuments in the Museum of Fine Arts, Boston". The Journal of Egyptian Archaeology. 21 (2). Sage Publications, Inc.: 147–151. doi:10.2307/3854707. JSTOR 3854707.
- El Awady, Tarek (2006). "The royal family of Sahure. New evidence" ( (PDF)). In Bárta, Miroslav; Krejčí, Jaromír (eds.). Abusir and Saqqara in the Year 2005. Prague: Academy of Sciences of the Czech Republic, Oriental Institute. pp. 31–45. ISBN 978-80-7308-116-4. Archived from the original on 1 February 2011.
- El-Shahawy, Abeer; Atiya, Farid S. (2005). The Egyptian Museum in Cairo. A Walk Through The Alleys of Ancient Egypt. Cairo: Farid Atiya Press. ISBN 978-9-77-171983-0.
- "False door of Nikauhor's tomb". The Giza Archive. Museum of Fine Arts Boston. 1936.
- Gardiner, Alan (1959). The Royal Canon of Turin. Oxford: Griffith Institute. OCLC 21484338.
- Gourdon, Yannis (2007). Recherches sur l'anthroponymie dans l'Égypte du IIIe millénaire avant J.-C.: signification et portée sociale du nom égyptien avant le Moyen Empire (PhD). Lyon: Université Lumière Lyon 2.
- Goedicke, Hans (2000). "Abusir–Saqqara–Giza". In Bárta, Miroslav; Krejčí, Jaromír (eds.). Abusir and Saqqara in the year 2000. Archiv Orientální, Supplementa. Vol. 9. Prague: Academy of Sciences of the Czech Republic, Oriental Institute. pp. 397–412. ISBN 978-8-08-542539-0.
- Grimal, Nicolas (1992). A History of Ancient Egypt. Translated by Ian Shaw. Oxford: Blackwell Publishing. ISBN 978-0-631-19396-8.
- Hassan, Selim (1936). Excavations at Gîza II, 1930-1931. Cairo: Faculty of Arts of the Egyptian University & Government Press. pp. 75–86, figs. 81–91, pls. 23–26. OCLC 1242410271.
- Hassan, Selim; Habashi, Banoub (1941). Excavations at Gîza III, 1931-1932. Cairo: Government Press, Bulaq. OCLC 660023462.
- Hassan, Selim (1943). Excavations at Giza. Volume IV. Cairo: Government Press. OCLC 1181487436.
- Hayes, William (1978). The Scepter of Egypt: A Background for the Study of the Egyptian Antiquities in The Metropolitan Museum of Art. Vol. 1, From the Earliest Times to the End of the Middle Kingdom. New York: Metropolitan Museum of Art. OCLC 7427345.
- "Head of King Menkaura (Mycerinus)". Museum of Fine Arts Boston. 1908.
- Herodotus (1963). Godley, Alfred Denis (ed.). The Histories. Herodotus, With an English Translation by A. D. Godley. Cambridge, Mass.: Harvard University Press. OCLC 936469061.
- Hornung, Erik; Krauss, Rolf; Warburton, David, eds. (2012). Ancient Egyptian Chronology. Handbook of Oriental Studies. Leiden, Boston: Brill. ISBN 978-90-04-11385-5. ISSN 0169-9423.
- How, Walter Wybergh; Wells, Joseph (1991). A commentary on Herodotus. Oxford, New York: Oxford University Press. ISBN 978-0-19-814384-0. OCLC 489656669.
- Hsu, Shih-Wei (2012). "The development of Ancient Egyptian royal inscriptions". The Journal of Egyptian Archaeology. 98. Sage Publications, Inc.: 269–283. doi:10.1177/030751331209800115. JSTOR 24645014. S2CID 190032178.
- Janák, Jiří; Vymazalová, Hana; Coppens, Filip (2011). "The Fifth Dynasty "sun temples" in a broader context". In Bárta, Miroslav; Coppens, Filip; Krejčí, Jaromír (eds.). Abusir and Saqqara in the Year 2010. Prague: Charles University in Prague, Faculty of Arts. pp. 430–442. ISBN 978-8-07-308385-4.
- Jánosi, Peter (2005). Giza in der 4. Dynastie. Die Baugeschichte und Belegung einer Nekropole des Alten Reiches. Band I: Die Mastabas der Kernfriedhöfe und die Felsgräber (in German). Wien: Verlag der Österreichischen Akademie der Wissenschaften. ISBN 3-7001-3244-1.
- Jéquier, Gustave (1925). "Le Mastabat-el-Faraoun et le culte funéraire de Shepseskaf". Comptes rendus des séances de l'Académie des Inscriptions et Belles-Lettres (in French). 69 (4): 251–261. doi:10.3406/crai.1925.75168.
- Katary, Sally (2001). "Taxation". In Redford, Donald B. (ed.). The Oxford Encyclopedia of Ancient Egypt, Volume 3. Oxford: Oxford University Press. pp. 351–356. ISBN 978-0-19-510234-5.
- "Kaunisut (G 8960)". Digital Giza. 2022 Giza Project at Harvard University. 2022.
- Kozloff, Arielle P. (1982). "Weserkaf, Boy King of Dynasty V". The Bulletin of the Cleveland Museum of Art. 69 (7): 211–223. JSTOR 25159780.
- Lehner, Mark (2002). "The Pyramid Age Settlement of the Southern Mount at Giza". Journal of the American Research Center in Egypt. 39. American Research Center in Egypt: 27–74. doi:10.2307/40001149. JSTOR 40001149.
- Lehner, Mark (2008). The Complete Pyramids. London: Thames & Hudson Ltd. ISBN 978-0-500-05084-2.
- Lepsius, Carl Richard (1897) [first publication 1841–1859]. Denkmäler aus Ägypten und Äthiopien. Vol. I, Unteraegypten und Memphis. Leipzig: J. C. Hinrichs'sche Buchhandlung. OCLC 458103866.
- Lichtheim, Miriam (2006). Ancient Egyptian literature: a book of readings. The Old and Middle Kingdoms. Vol. I. Berkeley: University of California Press. ISBN 978-0-52-024842-7.
- Málek, Jaromir (1992). "A Meeting of the Old and New. Saqqâra during the New Kingdom". In Lloyd, Alan B. (ed.). Studies in Pharaonic Religion and Society. In Honour of J. Gwyn Griffiths. The Egypt Exploration Society. Occasional Publications. Vol. 8. London: Egypt Exploration Society. pp. 57–76. ISBN 0-85698-120-6.
- Málek, Jaromir (2000). "The Old Kingdom (c. 2160–2055 BC)". In Shaw, Ian (ed.). The Oxford History of Ancient Egypt. Oxford University Press. pp. 83–107. ISBN 978-0-19-815034-3.
- Maragioglio, Vito; Rinaldi, Celeste (1967). L'architettura delle piramidi Menfite. Parte VI, La grande fossa di Zauiet el-Aryan, la Piramide di Micerino, il Mastabat Faraun, la Tomba di Khentkaus (in Italian). Rapallo: Officine Grafiche Canessa. OCLC 1044725030.
- Morales, Antonio J. (2006). "Traces of official and popular veneration to Nyuserra Iny at Abusir. Late Fifth Dynasty to the Middle Kingdom". In Bárta, Miroslav; Coppens, Filip; Krejčí, Jaromír (eds.). Abusir and Saqqara in the Year 2005, Proceedings of the Conference held in Prague (June 27 – July 5, 2005). Prague: Academy of Sciences of the Czech Republic, Oriental Institute. pp. 311–341. ISBN 978-80-7308-116-4.
- Nuzzolo, Massimiliano (2007). "The Sun Temples of the Vth Dynasty: A Reassessment". Studien zur Altägyptischen Kultur. 36. Helmut Buske Verlag GmbH: 217–247. JSTOR 25157803.
- Nuzzolo, Massimiliano; Krejčí, Jaromír (2017). "Heliopolis and the solar cult in the third millenium BC" (PDF). Ägypten und Levante / Egypt and the Levant. 27: 357–380. doi:10.1553/AEundL27s357. JSTOR 26524908.
- O'Mara, Patrick F. (1996). "Was There an Old Kingdom Historiography? Is It Datable?". Orientalia. Nova Series. 65 (3). Gregorian Biblical Press: 197–208. JSTOR 43078130.
- O'Mara, Patrick F. (1997). "Manetho and the Turin Canon: A Comparison of Regnal Years". Göttinger Miszellen. 158: 49–61. ISSN 0344-385X.
- Quirke, Stephen (2001). The Cult of Ra. Sun-Worship in Ancient Egypt. New York: Thames and Hudson. ISBN 978-0500051078.
- Ramsey, Christopher Bronk; Dee, Michael W.; Rowland, Joanne M.; Higham, Thomas F. G.; Harris, Stephen A.; Brock, Fiona; Quiles, Anita; Wild, Eva M.; Marcus, Ezra S.; Shortland, Andrew J. (2010). "Radiocarbon-Based Chronology for Dynastic Egypt". Science. New Series. 328 (5985). American Association for the Advancement of Science: 1554–1557. Bibcode:2010Sci...328.1554R. doi:10.1126/science.1189395. JSTOR 40656429. PMID 20558717. S2CID 206526496.
- Redford, Donald B. (2001). "Manetho". In Redford, Donald B. (ed.). The Oxford Encyclopedia of Ancient Egypt, Volume 2. Oxford: Oxford University Press. pp. 336–337. ISBN 978-0-19-510234-5.
- Reisner, Georges A. (1931). Mycerinus: The Temples of the Third Pyramid at Giza. Cambridge, MA.: Harvard University Press. OCLC 248947316.
- Reisner, Georges A. (1939). "A Family of Royal Estate Stewards of Dynasty V". Bulletin of the Museum of Fine Arts. 37 (220). Boston: Museum of Fine Arts, Boston: 29–35. JSTOR 4170711.
- Rice, Michael (1999). Who is who in Ancient Egypt. London; New York: Routledge. ISBN 978-0-203-44328-6.
- Ricke, Herbert (1950). Bemerkungen zur Ägyptischen Baukunst des Alten Reichs II. Beiträge zur Ägyptischen Bauforschung und Altertumskunde. Vol. 5. Cairo: Institut für Ägytpsiche Bauforschung und Altertumskunde. OCLC 1128384201.
- Ryholt, Kim (1997). The Political Situation in Egypt during the Second Intermediate Period, c. 1800–1550 B.C. CNI publications, 20. Copenhagen: Carsten Niebuhr Institute of Near Eastern Studies, University of Copenhagen : Museum Tusculanum Press. ISBN 978-87-7289-421-8.
- Etheredge, Laura (ed.). "Saqqarah". Encyclopædia Britannica.
- Schneider, Thomas (2002). Lexikon der Pharaonen (in German). Düsseldorf: Patmos Albatros Verlag. ISBN 978-3-49-196053-4.
- Sethe, Kurt Heinrich (1903). Urkunden des Alten Reichs (in German). wikipedia entry: Urkunden des Alten Reichs. Leipzig: J.C. Hinrichs. OCLC 846318602.
- "Shepseskafankh (G 8492)". Digital Giza. 2022 Giza Project at Harvard University. 2022.
- "Shepseskafankh (G 8983)". Digital Giza. 2022 Giza Project at Harvard University. 2022.
- "Shepseskafankh (G 1008)". Digital Giza. 2022 Giza Project at Harvard University. 2022.
- "Shepseskafankh (G 6040)". Digital Giza. 2022 Giza Project at Harvard University. 2022.
- Smith, William Stevenson (1971). "The Old Kingdom of Egypt and the Beginning of the First Intermediate Period". In Edwards, I. E. S.; Gadd, C. J.; Hammond, N. G. L. (eds.). The Cambridge Ancient History, Volume 1, Part 2. Early History of the Middle East (3rd ed.). London, New york: Cambridge University Press. pp. 145–207. ISBN 978-0521077910. OCLC 33234410.
- Sowada, Karin N. (2009). Egypt in the Eastern Mediterranean During the Old Kingdom: An Archaeological Perspective. Orbis Biblicus et Orientalis. Vol. 237. Fribourg, Switzerland: Academic Press Fribourg, Vandenhoeck & Ruprecht Göttingen. ISBN 978-3-7278-1649-9.
- Spalinger, Anthony (1994). "Dated Texts of the Old Kingdom". Studien zur Altägyptischen Kultur. 21: 275–319. JSTOR 25152700.
- Stadelmann, Reiner (2000). "Userkaf in Saqqara und Abusir. Untersuchungen zur Thronfolge in der 4. und frühen 5. Dynastie". In Bárta, Miroslav; Krejčí, Jaromír (eds.). Abusir and Saqqara in the Year 2000. Archiv Orientální, Supplementa (in German). Vol. IX. Prague: Academy of Sciences of the Czech Republic, Oriental Institute. pp. 529–542. ISBN 978-8-08-542539-0. OCLC 48015047.
- Stadelmann, Rainer (2001). "Old Kingdom: Fourth Dynasty". In Redford, Donald B. (ed.). The Oxford Encyclopedia of Ancient Egypt, Volume 2. Oxford: Oxford University Press. pp. 593–597. ISBN 978-0-19-510234-5.
- "Standfigur des Ba-ba-ef". Kunsthistorisches Museum Wien. 1914.
- Strudwick, Nigel (1985). The Administration of Egypt in the Old Kingdom: The Highest Titles and Their Holders (PDF). Studies in Egyptology. London; Boston: Kegan Paul International. ISBN 978-0-7103-0107-9.
- Strudwick, Nigel C. (2005). Texts from the Pyramid Age. Writings from the Ancient World (book 16). Atlanta: Society of Biblical Literature. ISBN 978-1-58983-680-8.
- Troy, Lana (1986). Patterns of queenship in ancient egyptian myth and history. Boreas. Vol. 14. Uppsala: Upsaliensis Academiae. ISBN 9789155419196. OCLC 963431998.
- Tyldesley, Joyce (2005). À la découverte des pyramides d'Égypte. Champollion (in French). Translated by Nathalie Baum. Monaco: Éditions du Rocher. ISBN 978-2-268-05326-4.
- Vercoutter, Jean (1992). L'Egypte et la vallée du Nil. Tome 1, Des origines à la fin de l'Ancien Empire 12000-2000 av. J.-C. Nouvelle Clio (in French). Vol. 50. Paris: Presses Universitaires de France. ISBN 9782130441571. OCLC 611721854.
- Verner, Miroslav; Zemina, Milan (1994). Forgotten pharaohs, lost pyramids: Abusir (PDF). Praha: Academia Škodaexport. ISBN 978-80-200-0022-4. Archived from the original (PDF) on 1 February 2011.
- Verner, Miroslav (2001a). "Archaeological Remarks on the 4th and 5th Dynasty Chronology" (PDF). Archiv Orientální. 69 (3): 363–418. ISSN 0044-8699.
- Verner, Miroslav (2001b). "Pyramid". In Redford, Donald B. (ed.). The Oxford Encyclopedia of Ancient Egypt, Volume 3. Oxford: Oxford University Press. pp. 87–95. ISBN 978-0-19-510234-5.
- Verner, Miroslav (2001c). "Old Kingdom: An Overview". In Redford, Donald B. (ed.). The Oxford Encyclopedia of Ancient Egypt, Volume 2. Oxford: Oxford University Press. pp. 585–591. ISBN 978-0-19-510234-5.
- Verner, Miroslav (2007). "Sahure's Causeway. New Archaeological Discoveries in the Abusir Pyramid Field". Archaeogate Egittologia. ISSN 1973-2953. Archived from the original on 16 July 2011.
- Verner, Miroslav (2010). "Some considerations concerning the Old Kingdom royal palace (aH)". Anthropologie. XLVIII (2): 91–96. ISSN 0323-1119.
- Vernus, Pascal; Yoyotte, Jean (1996). Dictionnaire des Pharaons (in French). Paris: Noêsis. p. 220. ISBN 2-911606-08-6.
- von Beckerath, Jürgen (1984). "Schepseskaf". In Helck, Wolfgang; Eberhard, Otto (eds.). Lexikon der Ägyptologie (in German). Vol. V. Pyramidenbau–Steingefäße. Wiesbaden: Harrassowitz. p. 584. ISBN 3-447-02489-5.
- von Beckerath, Jürgen (1997). Chronologie des pharaonischen Ägypten : die Zeitbestimmung der ägyptischen Geschichte von der Vorzeit bis 332 v. Chr. Münchner ägyptologische Studien (in German). Vol. 46. Mainz am Rhein: Philipp von Zabern. ISBN 978-3-8053-2310-9.
- von Beckerath, Jürgen (1999). Handbuch der ägyptischen Königsnamen. Münchner ägyptologische Studien (in German). Mainz: Philip von Zabern. ISBN 978-3-8053-2591-2.
- Waddell, William Gillan (1971). Manetho. Loeb classical library, 350. Cambridge, Massachusetts; London: Harvard University Press; W. Heinemann. OCLC 6246102.
- Wildung, Dietrich (1969). Die Rolle ägyptischer Könige im Bewußtsein ihrer Nachwelt. Teil I. Posthume Quellen über die Könige der ersten vier Dynastien. Münchener Ägyptologische Studien (in German). Vol. 17. München, Berlin: Deutscher Kunstverlag. OCLC 1151084273.
- Wildung, Dietrich (1977). Helck, Wolfgang; Eberhard, Otto (eds.). Lexikon der Ägyptologie (in German). Vol. II. Erntefest–Hordjedef. Wiesbaden: Harrassowitz. p. 1257. ISBN 3-447-01876-3.

Preceded by Menkaure	Pharaoh of Egypt; End of Fourth Dynasty	Succeeded by Userkaf
