= Thamphthis =

Ancient Egyptian ruler of the 4th dynasty

Pharaoh
- Reign: c. 2500 BC
- Predecessor: Shepseskaf
- Successor: Userkaf?
Royal titulary
Nomen
hieroglyphs (reconstitution):
Djedefptah
ḏd.f ptḥ
He endures like Ptah
< R11 f p t H >
Alternative reconstitution
Djedefkaf
ḏd.f k3 f
His Ka is enduring
< R11 f D28 I9 >
Turin canon
(Column III, line 16)
HASH HASH HASH G7 HASH M4 X1 N33 Z1 Z1

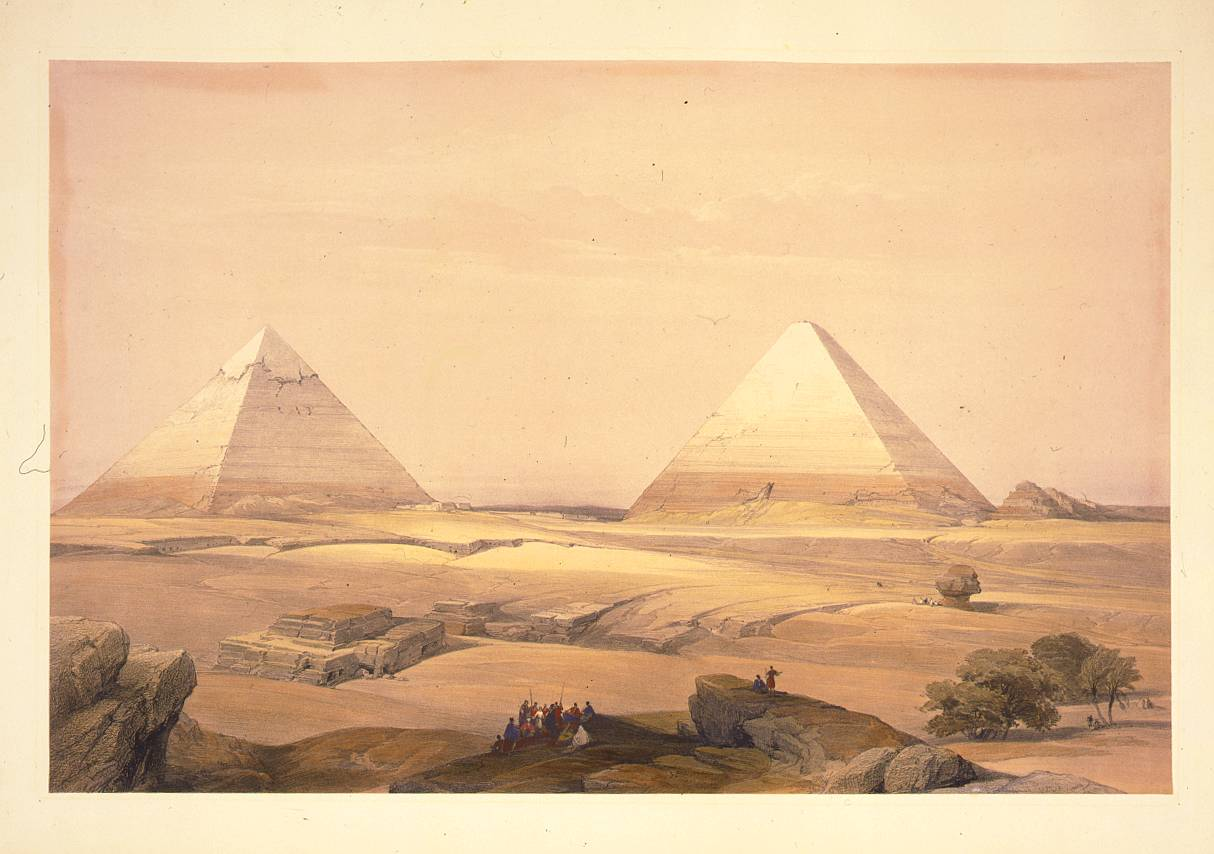

Thamphthis (fl. c. 2500 BC) is the hellenized name of an ancient Egyptian ruler (pharaoh) of the 4th Dynasty in the Old Kingdom, who may have ruled under the name Djedefptah or Djedefkaf for between two and nine years. His original Egyptian name is lost, but it may have been Djedefptah ("he endures like Ptah") according to Egyptologists like William C. Hayes, or Djedefkaf ("his Ka is enduring") according to other Egyptologists. Thamphthis is one of the shadowy rulers of the Old Kingdom, since he is completely unattested in contemporary sources. For this reason, his historical figure is discussed intensely by historians and Egyptologists.

== Background ==
Since Thamphthis' name was found in the historical works of Manetho, the Aegyptiacae, Egyptologists are trying to connect this ruler with contemporary kings to build up a continuous chronology, which resulted in controversies and debates.

As early as 1887, Eduard Meyer viewed Thamphthis as a mere usurper, who was not allowed to be mentioned in royal annals or have his own mortuary cult because he gained the throne illegitimately. Peter Jánosi goes further and says that Thamphthis is a fiction, due to the lack of archaeological support. He claims that Thamphthis should be erased from modern kinglists.

Winfried Seipel and Hermann Alexander Schlögl instead postulate that the historical figure behind Thamphthis could have been queen Khentkaus I. This theory is supported by Khentkaus being depicted in her mortuary temple as a ruling pharaoh with nemes-headdress, king's beard and uraeus-diadem on her forehead. But this theory is problematic since Khentkaus' name never appears inside a serekh or royal cartouche.

Wolfgang Helck points out that Khentkaus I could have been the mother of Thamphthis, so Thamphthis would have been the son of king Shepseskaf. As a possible wife of Thamphthis he proposes a princess named Bunefer, who may have been the daughter of Shepseskaf. She was a priestess of Shepseskaf.

== Name sources and contradictions ==
In the Manethonian tradition of the historian Sextus Julius Africanus, who translated Manetho, Thamphthis is described as the last ruler of the 4th dynasty with a reign of nine years. In the tradition of the historians Eusebius and Eratosthenes his name is missed. Eusebius gives the reason that Thamphthis was not meant to be named, for he "didn't do something worth to be mentioned".

A further source for the chronology of rulers of the Old Kingdom is the Royal Canon of Turin, composed during the 19th dynasty around 1300 BC. It names kings which are omitted in many other kinglists. But the Turin Canon is damaged at several spots, so many royal names are fragmentary or completely lost in lacunae today. For this reason it cannot be excluded that Thamphthis' name was originally present in this document too, since the Aegyptiacae of Manetho are mostly consistent with the Turin Canon. In column III, line 12 king Khafre is mentioned, after him, in line 13, a lacuna appears. After king Shepseskaf, mentioned in line 15, a second lacuna appears. Whilst line 13 may possibly be assigned to a king Baka, the missing line 16 could have originally held Thamphthis' name. These lacunae cover two years during which a king could have reigned.

The Royal kinglist of Saqqara from the tomb of Tjuneroy (19th dynasty) lists nine kings for the 4th dynasty, whilst the Abydos King List gives only six names. The Saqqara-Table has after Shepseskaf two cartouches before Userkaf, but both are heavily damaged, so the original names are no longer legible. Whilst it'sthought that the former of these two cartouches once may have held Thamphthis' name, the other cartouche between it and Userkaf remains a mystery. Jürgen von Beckerath proposes king Nyuserre as the holder of the other cartouche; he thinks it is possible that Nyuserre was simply misplaced to the beginning of the 5th Dynasty. The Saqqara king list would therefore give the following succession: Khafre → Bikheris → Menkaure → Shepseskaf → Thamphthis → Nyuserrê → Userkaf. However, in recent years, it's been thought that the holder of the cartouche should actually be Queen Khentkaus; which would make the Saqqara king list succession be: Khafre → Bikheris → Menkaure → Shepseskaf → Thamphthis → Khentkaus → Userkaf.

A rock inscription in the Wadi Hammamat made in the Middle Kingdom presents a list of the cartouche-names of Khufu, Djedefre, Baufra and prince Djedefhor (also recorded as Hordjedef). Djedefhor's name is written in a cartouche, too. This leads to the possibility that he could have been a king for a very short while himself. If this was true, this fact would close the chronological gaps. But contemporary sources don't show Djedefhor and Baufra as kings; they give to these two only the titles of princes and call them both "son of the king".

The tomb inscriptions of several high officials, princes and priests do not preserve any evidence that some kind of internal political conflict had arisen or that a usurper had seized the throne of Egypt. Prince Sekhemkare reports about his career under the kings Khafre, Menkaura, Shepseskaf, Userkaf and even Sahure, but makes no mention of Thamphthis. The same goes for the high official Netjer-pu-nesut, who was honoured under the kings Djedefre, Khafre, Menkaura, Shepseskaf, Userkaf and Sahure. Again no Thamphthis is mentioned. The 5th dynasty high priest and official Ptahshepses who served under king Niuserre and took care of the mortuary cults of king Menkaura and Shepseskaf also made no reference to Thamphthis. The late Patrick F. O'Mara in a GM 158 paper notes that "no royal monument private tomb in the cemeteries of Gizeh and Saqqara record names of any other [except the aforementioned] kings for the [fourth] dynasty. No names of estates of the period compounded with royal names make mention of any other [fourth dynasty] kings than these, nor do the names of the royal grandchildren, who often bore the name of a royal ancestor as a component of their own" names.

The lack of contemporary attestations for Thamphthis does not by itself prove that he was a "faux king" or "phantom king" since he may well have been a short-lived ruler of the 4th Dynasty. The stela of the 5th Dynasty official Khau-Ptah is informative: while this official lists his career in an uninterrupted sequence of Sahure, Neferirkare, Raneferef and Niuserre, he completely omits Shepseskare. Shepseskare or Sisires likely did not rule Egypt for the seven years assigned to him by both Manetho and the Turin Canon judging by the paucity of contemporary records for his rule, but he certainly ruled Egypt for a brief period of time. This is established by the existence of two cylinder seals identifying him and four or five fragments of clay sealings bearing his name. In more recent years, "several new sealings [of Shepseskare]" which were found in Abusir also show that Shepseskare did exist. Verner argues that the archaeological context of the sealings show that Shepseskare succeeded Raneferef (rather than the reverse as Manetho and the Turin Canon states) and that a dynastic struggle ensued in which Shepseskare was soon overthrown by Niuserre, Raneferef's brother, after a very brief reign. This would explain the surprising omission of Shepseskare by Khau-ptah since the former was a usurper who briefly seized the throne after Raneferef's death. But there is no evidence for any dynastic difficulties in the late 4th Dynasty and the complete lack of contemporary attestations for Thamphthis is strong evidence for regarding him as a phantom king. In this situation, the two year figure assigned to him by later Egyptian records could possibly be added to Shepseskaf's existing 4-year reign.

== Literature ==
- Jürgen von Beckerath: Handbuch der ägyptischen Königsnamen, von Zabern, Mainz 1999, ISBN 3-422-00832-2
- Jürgen von Beckerath: Chronologie des pharaonischen Ägypten, von Zabern, Mainz 1997 ISBN 3-8053-2310-7
- Iowerth Eiddon Stephen Edwards: The Cambridge ancient history, Band 3. Cambridge University Press, Cambridge 2000, ISBN 978-0-521-07791-0
- William C. Hayes: The Scepter of Egypt, Band 1: From the Earliest Times to the End of the Middle Kingdom. Yale University Press, New York 1990 (Neuauflage), ISBN 978-0-300-09159-5
- Wolfgang Helck: Geschichte des Alten Ägypten. BRILL, Leiden 1981, ISBN 90-04-06497-4
- Peter Jánosi: Giza in der 4. Dynastie. Die Baugeschichte und Belegung einer Nekropole des Alten Reiches. Band I: Die Mastabas der Kernfriedhöfe und die Felsgräber. Verlag der Österreichischen Akademie der Wissenschaften, Wien 2005, ISBN 3-7001-3244-1
- Alan B. Lloyd: Herodotus, book II: commentary 99-182. BRILL, Leiden 1988, ISBN 978-90-04-04179-0
- Eduard Meyer, Johannes Duemichen: Geschichte des alten Aegyptens. Band 1 von: Allgemeine Geschichte in Einzeldarstellungen. Grote, Hamburg 1887
- Kim Ryholt, Adam Bülow-Jacobsen: The political situation in Egypt during the second Intermediate Period. Museum Tusculanum Press, 1997, ISBN 978-87-7289-421-8
- Wilfried Seipel: Untersuchungen zu den ägyptischen Königinnen der Frühzeit und des Alten Reiches. University of California, 1980
- Ian Shaw: The Oxford history of ancient Egypt. Oxford University Press, Oxford (UK) 2002, ISBN 978-0-19-280293-4
- William Gillian Waddell: Manetho - The Loeb classical library; 350 -. Harvard University Press, Cambridge (Mass.) 2004 (Reprint), ISBN 0-674-99385-3
