= Hekenuhedjet =

Ancient Egyptian queen consort

Hekenuhedjet in hieroglyphs
H k nw S2 HD
Hekenuhedjet
Praise of the White Crown

Hekenuhedjet was an ancient Egyptian queen consort of the 4th Dynasty, a wife of pharaoh Khafre. She is depicted in the tomb of her son, the vizier Sekhemkare.

On the western wall of the chapel Hekenuhedjet is shown seated behind her son Sekhemkare. She is depicted slightly larger than him. She has one of her arms around his shoulders. Facing them are scenes depicting boats. The text is damaged, but describes Hekenuhedjet as the great favorite and a priestess. Part of a title containing the words "his beloved" are visible.

In another scene in the chapel Hekenuhedjet and her son are seated before offering tables. Her son is called "The King's Son of His Body", "Director of the Palace", "Master of the Secrets of the Toilet-house", "Possessor of Honor in the Presence of His Father". Hekenuhedjet's titles are the "Possessor of Honor", "She Who Sees Horus and Set", "Priestess of [..]".

== Titles ==
According to Grajetzki, Hekenuhedjet's titles were: Great of Sceptre (wr.t-ḥts), She who sees Horus and Seth (m33.t-[ḥrw]-stš), King's Wife (ḥm.t-nỉswt), King's Beloved Wife (ḥm.t-nỉswt mrỉỉt=f), Priestess of Bapef (ḥm.t-nṯr b3-pf).
