= Rekhetre =

Egyptian queen

r a r x t
Rḫ.t Rꜥ

Queen consort of Egypt
- Tenure: c. 2500 BC
- Burial: Giza, Egypt
- Father: Khafre
- Religion: Ancient Egyptian Religion

Rekhetre (fl. c. 2500 BC) was an ancient Egyptian queen from the late 4th Dynasty or early 5th Dynasty. She was a daughter of King Khafre. Her husband is never mentioned, but Rekhetre would have been the wife of one of Khafre's successors, possibly Menkaure.

== Titles ==
Reketre was a King's daughter (of his body), She who sees Horus and Set, Great one of the hetes sceptre and a King's wife. In the tomb of her ka-servant Kaemnefret she is referred to as a daughter of Khafre.

== Tomb ==
Rekhetre's tomb was excavated from 1933–1935 by Selim Hassan. The tomb was first just known as the tomb of Rekhit-Ra, but was later given the number G 8530. The tomb is located in the Central Field which is part of the Giza Necropolis.

The tomb has a long passage which takes a 90 degree turn to the left and via an entrance leads to a shorter passage. A sharp turn to the right leads to a chapel. In one corner a niche was created and on the other side three pillars mark the passage to a side room. From that side room a sloping passage leads to a burial chamber containing a sarcophagus. The sarcophagus was empty. The leg bones of a bull were found on top of the sarcophagus, and human bones were found besides the sarcophagus. These human remains may be those of Rekhetre herself. A recess had been cut in one of the walls to hold the canopic jars, but these had disappeared.

Several items were found in the debris from the floor of the burial chamber. These include several small alabaster vases, a lid of a canopic jar, and an alabaster fragment containing the image of a woman seated on a chair. Further fragments of the canopic jars were found in the chapel area and the forecourt of the tomb.

== Tomb of Kaemnefert ==
The family tomb G 8538 belongs to Kaemnefert, Irenakhet Iri and Kakaiankh. Kaemnefret was an overseer of ka-priests of the funerary estate, and senior of the dockyard of neheb-boats. He was also a ka-servant of Rekhetre.

Kaemnefret is shown standing before Rekhetre in two matching scenes on the doorjambs. She is shown holding a lotus flower to her nose with her left hand. She is dressed in a simple long dress and has a long tripartite wig. She wears bracelets, anklets, and a necklace. Kaemnefret is shown at a smaller scale before the queen and is holding a censer in his hands. In a register below this scene four ka-servants are depicted: Ptahsheri carries a ewer and a basin, Ihy carries a live goose, followed by Iynefer who is holding a duck in each hand, and then Ptahwer who carries another live goose. All men are apparently wearing their kilts backwards. The matching scene on the other jamb is very similar. The ka-servants in the lower register are shown carrying legs of a bull and another goose.
