= Ptahshepses (high priest) =

Ancient Egyptian official

- High Priest of Ptah in Memphis
Egyptian name
p t V28 A50 s s
- Dynasty: 4th and 5th Dynasty
- Pharaoh: Menkaure, Shepseskaf, Userkaf, and Niuserre
- Burial: Mastaba C1 in Saqqara

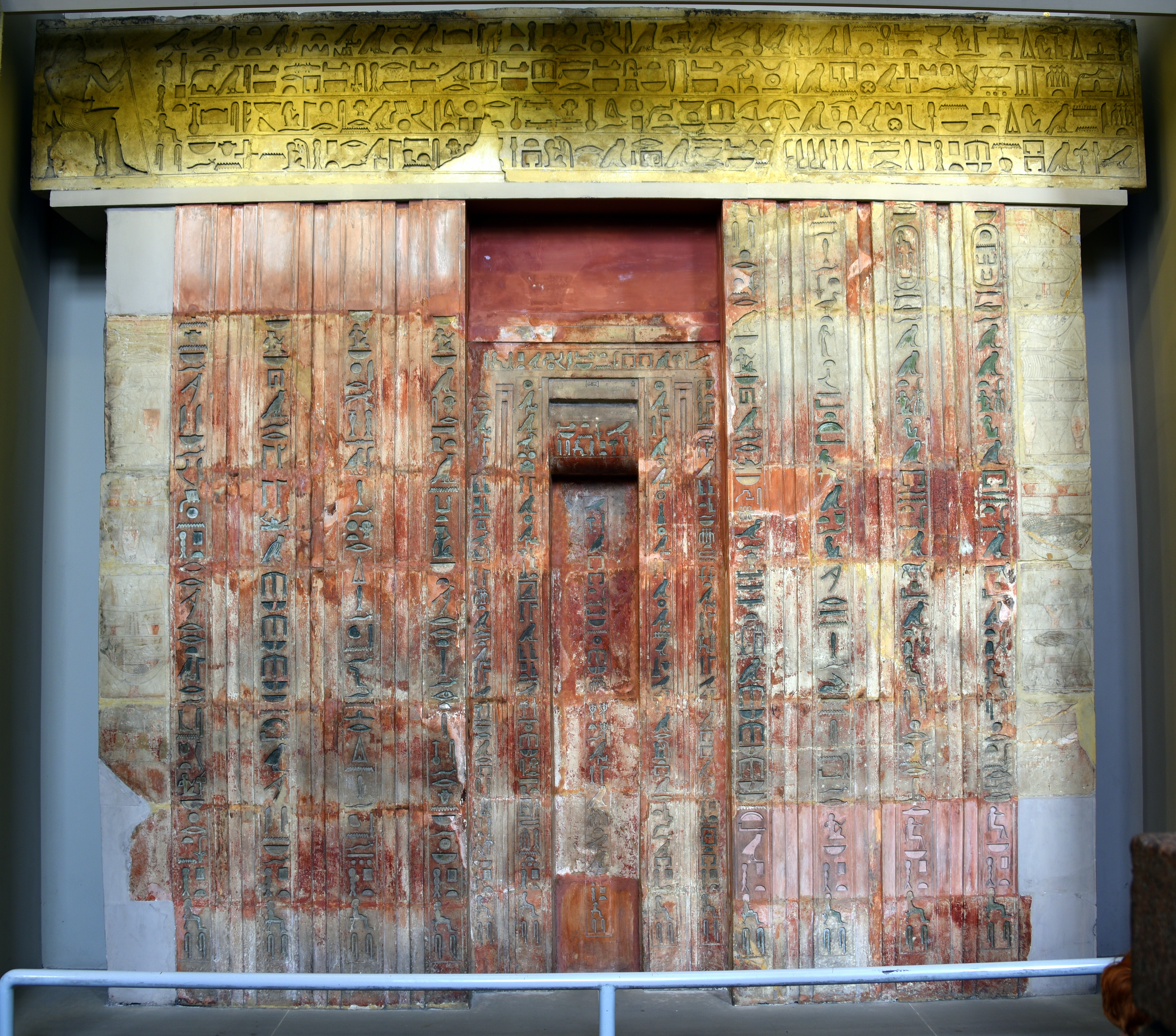
False door and architrave of Ptahspepses. From the Tomb of Ptahshepses at Saqqara, Egypt. Old Kingdom, 5th Dynasty, 25th century BCE. British Museum

Ptahshepses was an ancient Egyptian official at the end of the Fourth and the beginning of the Fifth Dynasty. His main title was that of a great one of the leaders of craftsmen, that in later periods is the main designation of the High Priest of Ptah.

Ptahshepses is mainly known from a false door that is today in the British Museum (Inv. no. EA 682), but coming from his tomb. A smaller fragment of the door is kept in the Oriental Institute Museum (Inv. no. 11084) in Chicago He is also known from statues and had a mastaba at Saqqara (mastaba C 1).

His false door bears a biographical inscription that reports the main events in his life. Starting on the far right of the door, column 1 records that Ptahshepses was born under king Menkaure and educated at the palace. Excluding the center of the door, it is assumed that each of the 8 columns records events under successive kings. So while only Menkaure and Shepseskaf's cartouches are visible, it is thought that under Userkaf, Ptahshepses married the eldest king's daughter Khamaat. In like manner, he would have lived at least until the reign of Niuserre.

On the lintel of the false door appears the underworld god Osiris in the offering formula. Osiris is otherwise not well attested in the Fifth Dynasty and there is a scholarly debate going on, about the first mentioning of Osiris in Ancient Egyptian sources. Depending on the life time of Ptahshepses, his inscriptions might be the earliest evidence for this deity. However, it is also possible that Ptahshepses died after Niuserre.

In 2022–23, the Czech Institute of Egyptology rediscovered the tomb of Ptahshepses, 160 years after initial excavation by Auguste Mariette.
