= Mortuary cult =

Ceremonial and religious form of a cult

A mortuary cult (also called a funerary cult or death cult) is a ceremonial and religious form of a cult fostered over a certain duration of time, often lasting for generations or even dynasties. It concerns deceased people kept in the memories of their bereaved, mostly family members or loyal servants.

== Forms of mortuary cults ==
The most common form of a mortuary cult is a tomb with gravestone which is visited by the bereaved frequently. A further, well known, form of a mortuary cult is a shrine with a picture or bust of the deceased, which is also visited and cared frequently. The Japanese Shintō religion is well known for its memorial shrines erected for mortuary cults. Another, more unusual, form of mortuary cult is an urn with ash, deposed at the home of the yet-living bereaved. Especially ancient cultures are known for their mortuary cults, because they left behind extraordinary memorials, which were used for mortuary cults during the epochs in which they were created.

=== Ancient Egypt ===
A famous form of mortuary cults is handed down by the Ancient Egyptians. The Egyptians fostered a very intense form of death cult because they were of the belief that the soul (Egypt. Ba) and consciousness (Egypt. Ka) frequently returned to the world of the living in attempt to guard and guide them. To hold the power of the soul and consciousness up eternally, the Egyptians erected shrines (so-called House-of-the-Ka) and mortuary temples, wherein they performed prayers and ceremonies over several dynasties. The mortuary cults for deceased kings were particularly costly and long-lasting. Early private tombs of the first four dynasties contained so-called slab steles with the stylized depiction of the deceased, sitting on an offering table. The steles also presented inscriptions with the name and title of the deceased, along with lists of offering food and grave goods the deceased could magically use in the otherworld. Private tombs (especially mastabas) also contained false doors, which the Egyptians believed that the Ba, Ka, and shadow of the deceased could use as a portal between the world of living and the world of the dead. Additionally, in later times the Egyptians erected Ka statues with the name of the deceased on the base. Royal statues were richly decorated and oversized and every day mortuary priests performed ritual purifications on these Ka statues.

The ancient Egyptians believed in life after death and that the body was needed to house the Ba and shadow, whenever they would visit the world of the living. They used elaborate mummification and embalming techniques to preserve the body. The special house for embalming was originally called "where life endures" in early times and later came to be known as the "beautiful house." The embalming process began with washing and shaving the deceased, followed by the procedure known as "opening the body." Embalmers made an incision on the left side of the torso to remove the internal organs. The only organ left in the body was the heart. All removed organs were burnt in early times. From the late Old Kingdom onward the embalmers dried and put them in special vessels called canopic jars. The brain of the deceased was destroyed, removed and discarded, because the Egyptians didn't know the functions and importance of the brain. The body was then covered in natron salts to absorb all moisture. After 40 days, the flesh would shrink, and the skin would darken, leaving only hair, skin and bones. The dried body cavity was stuffed with resins, sawdust and/or linen to give and keep shape. The whole body was then wrapped in many layers of linen bandages. During the process, priests placed magical protective amulets between the linen layers. The entire mummification process took about 70 days.

=== Ancient Rome ===
The Ancient Romans celebrated their mortuary cult at the end of every year. This feast was called Parentalia (derived from lat. parens and meaning "concerning the parents"). To celebrate it, the crypt or tomb was visited, the bereaved family members prayed, sang and ate food at the tomb, as if the deceased were still alive. Some weeks after that, another feast was celebrated: Caristia, the "feast of reconciliation". To strengthen the memorising effect of a mortuary cult the Ancient Romans placed palatial stelae at the burial site. The inscriptions on the stelae were full of hymns and glorifications in attempt to hold up an always positive picture of the deceased.

=== Ancient Greece ===
Similar to the Ancient Romans, the Ancient Greek also fostered a frequently repeated mortuary cult. But at Greece the cult was celebrated at the death day of the deceased. An interesting custom was the offering of coins. The Ancient Greeks were of the belief that the deceased had to cross the death river in Hades. The ferryman of that river, Kharon, required a coin from the deceased as an obolus. To assure that the deceased never were without coins, the bereaved offered a drachma coin made of silver.

=== Easter Island ===
A very obscure mortuary cult was fostered by the natives of the Easter Islands. Because almost no inscription survived from the height of the Easter Island culture and attempts to translate the Rongorongo language were undertaken for a long time, the only knowledge about the mortuary cult of the Easter Islands is based on reconstructions. The only remains of the mortuary cults are the most famous at the same time: giant statues made of volcanic stone, called Moai, were placed on flat platforms, bedighted with a wooden plaquette and crowned with a cylindric red stone. According to travelling reports from the 17th century, the Moai were memorial statues of deceased kings, noblemen and priests. But at the visits of the first Europeans, most of the mortuary cults were already abandoned.
