= Mastabat al-Fir'aun =

Archaeological site in Egypt

Mastabat al-Fir’aun (Mastaba of Shepseskaf)
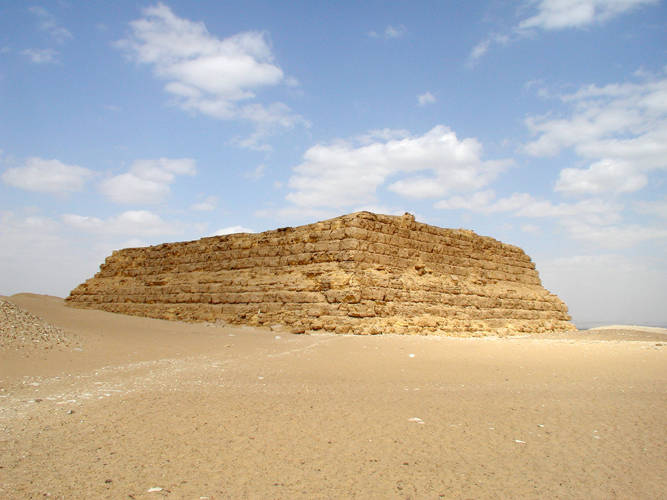
- Mastabat al-Fir’aun in 2007

- Location in Egypt
- 29°50′20″N 31°12′55″E
- Owner: Shepseskaf
Ancient name
< A51 s s kA f > W15 O24 (Note: Instead of the last sign, which depicts a pyramid, a similar sign without a point signifying 'mastaba' must have actually been used, which cannot be shown for technical reasons.)
Qbḥ Špss k3=f'
Qebeh Shepseskaf
"Shepseskaf is cool" or "cool place of Shepseskaf"
- Constructed: c. 2500 BC
- Type: Stepped mastaba
- Material: Red sandstone, pink granite, Tura limestone
- Height: 18 m (59 ft) contemporary
- Base: 99.6 m (327 ft) × 74.4 m (244 ft)
- Volume: 148.271 m^{3} (5,236 cu ft)
- Slope: c. 70°

The Mastabat al-Fir'aun (Arabic: مصطبة الفرعون, romanized: Maṣṭabat al-Firʿawn, also referred to in Egyptological literature as the Mastaba el-Faraun, Mastabat el-Faraun or Mastabat Faraun, and meaning "Bench of the Pharaoh") is the grave monument of the ancient Egyptian king Shepseskaf (reign c. 2510–2503 BC), the last king of the Fourth Dynasty documented to date. It is located in South Saqqara halfway between the Pyramid of Djoser at Saqqara and the pyramids of Sneferu, the founder of the Fourth Dynasty, at Dahshur. The structure is located close to the pyramid of Pepi II, a ruler of the Sixth Dynasty. The stone quarry for the structure is located west of the Red Pyramid of Sneferu.

== Discovery ==
The Mastabat al-Fir’aun was described for the first time by John Perring in the middle of the 19th century. Karl Richard Lepsius also sought out the tomb, but he did not carry out any close investigation. The first investigation of the subterranean parts of the structure was carried out by Auguste Mariette in 1858. A proper excavation of the whole tomb complex was first undertaken by Gustave Jéquier in 1924 or 1925. He was also the first to assign the structure to Shepseskaf, as a result of the discovery of a fragment of a stele. Before this, the tomb had erroneously been assigned to Unas, the last ruler of the Fifth Dynasty.

== Description ==
=== Mastaba ===
The mastaba is 99.6 metres long and 74.4 metres wide. It is around 18 metres high and the sides have an incline of about 70°. For the core structure, the same red sandstone was used as in the nearby Red Pyramid of Sneferu. Only very sparse traces of the outer cladding remain today, but from these it can be concluded that the lowest layer was clad in pink granite and all other layers were clad in Tura limestone.

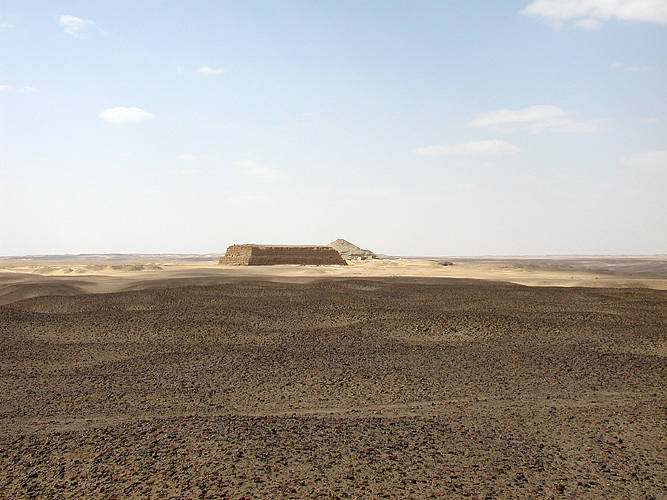
The mastaba from the southeast

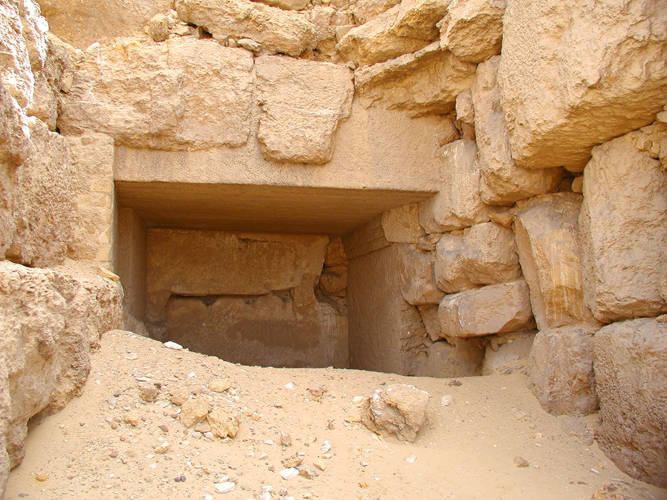
Entrance to the subterranean chambers

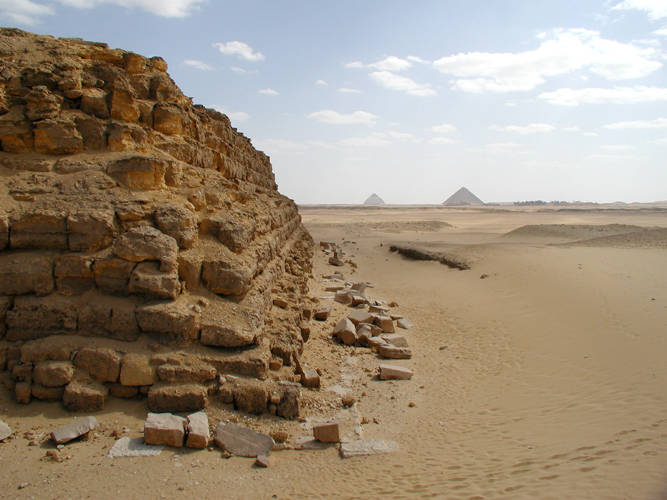
The northwest corner of the mastaba

== Substructure ==
The entrance to the subterranean system of chambers is located on the shorter, northern side. A passage with a slope of 23°30′ leads down into the ground. It was originally 20.75 metres long, but due to a collapse it is now only 16.3 metres long. After this descent, the passage continues on the horizontal. This portion forms a small chamber with a length of 2.67 metres and a height of 2 metres. After this chamber, three portcullis stones are still anchored in the ceiling. At this point the passage is 1.1 metres wide and its height decreases to 1.27 metres. The walls and ceiling are clad in granite. After the portcullis stones, the height of the passage increases again, but the floor is very uneven, since it was no longer plastered. After a further reduction of height to 1.2 metres and a total length of 19.46 metres, the horizontal passage finally reaches the ante-chamber.

The ante-chamber has an east–west length of 8.31 metres, a width of 3.05 metres and a height of 5.55 metres. It has a pointed roof made of granite. A 1.2 m-high (3.9 ft), 1.11 m-wide (3.6 ft) and 1.54 m-long (5.1 ft) passage with a slope of 10°30′ extends from its western end, leading to the burial chamber. This is 7.79 metres long, 3.85 metres wide and 4.9 metres high. It has a pointed granite roof, with a ceiling shaped like a barrel vault. Only fragments remain of the sarcophagus, which was probably made of greywacke or basalt. The ante-chamber and burial chamber were both clad with granite, but it was not smoothed or polished.

Another passage leads south from the southeast corner of the ante-chamber. It is 10.62 metres long, 1.14 metres wide and between 2.1 and 2.3 metres high. On its east side there are four small niches and there is another one on the west side, immediately opposite the southernmost of the eastern niches. The eastern niches are between 2.1 and 2.27 metres long, barely 0.8 metres wide and 1.4 metres high, the western niche is 2.65 metres long and 1.16 metres wide.

== Tomb complex ==
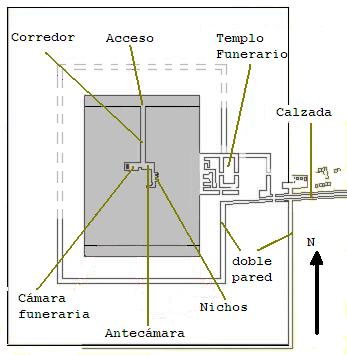
Groundplan of the tomb complex in Spanish

The mastaba is surrounded by two mudbrick walls. The innermost one is about ten metres away from the mastaba on all sides. It is 2.05 metres thick. The second wall encircles the whole funerary area at a distance of almost 48 metres. On the east side of the mastaba was a small funerary temple, of which only the foundations and a few remnants of the walls remain today. A causeway of which only the upper portion remains, terminated at this temple. The rest of the causeway and the valley temple are no longer in evidence.
