= Khentkaus I =

Queen of Ancient Egypt during the 4th dynasty

Coordinates: 29°58′24.26″N 31°8′8.19″E

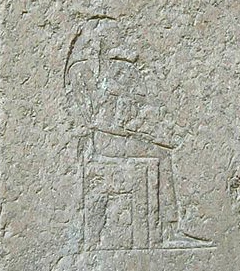
- Khentkaus depicted on her tomb
- Burial: Pyramid of Khentkaus I, Giza, Egypt
Egyptian name
xnt t kA kA kA sḫnt-kꜣw.s

Title of Khentkaus I and Khentkaus II in hieroglyphs
M23 X1 L2 X1 M23 X1 L2 X1 G14
Mut-nesut-biti-nesut-biti
mw.t-nsw-bi.tj-nsw-bi.tj

Khentkaus I, also referred to as Khentkawes (fl. c. 2500 BC) was a royal woman who lived in ancient Egypt during both the Fourth Dynasty and the Fifth Dynasty. She may have been a daughter of king Menkaure, the wife of both king Shepseskaf and king Userkaf (the founder of the Fifth Dynasty), and the mother of king Sahure.

Some suggest that she was the regent for one of her sons. It is also speculated, based on aspects of her burial, that she may have been the king of Upper and Lower Egypt in her own right. Her mastaba at Giza – tomb LG100 – is located very close to Menkaure's pyramid complex. This close connection may point to a family relationship. Although the relationship is not clear, the proximity of the pyramid complex of Khentkaus to that of king Menkaure has led to the conjecture that she may have been his daughter.

== Life ==
Khentkaus's burial complex confirms her royal status. Some of her titles are ambiguous and open to interpretation. She appears to have served as regent and may have taken the title of king. On a granite doorway leading into her tomb, Khentkaus I is given titles that may be read either as mother of two kings of upper and lower Egypt; as mother of the king of upper and lower Egypt and herself the king of upper and lower Egypt; or, as one scholar reads it, the king of upper and lower Egypt and the mother of two kings of upper and lower Egypt. Furthermore, her depiction on this doorway also gives her the full trappings of kingship, including the false beard of the king. This depiction and the title given have led some Egyptologists to suggest that she reigned as king near the end of the fourth dynasty.

It is widely speculated that she was the daughter of Menkaure. Much evidence supports the idea. Khentkaus may have been married to king Userkaf and may have been the mother of Sahure and Neferirkare Kakai. Egyptologist Miroslav Verner has stated that it is more likely, however, that Sahure was a son of Userkaf and his wife Neferhetepes. He also suggested that Khentkaus was the mother and regent for her son Thamphthis and the mother of Neferirkare Kakai.

Manetho's King List has Menkaure and Thampthis reigning in the Fourth Dynasty, which ties Khentkaus to the end of the Fourth Dynasty, but the suggestions of her marriage to Userkaf and having been the mother of Sahure could tie her to the Fifth Dynasty as well.

== Titles ==
- King's Mother (mwt-niswt)
- Mother of Two Dual Kings (mwt-nswy-bitwy) or Dual King and Mother of a Dual King (nsw-bity mwt-nsw-bity) (Dodson and Hilton)
- King of Upper and Lower Egypt (Junker)

== Theories regarding Khentkaus I ==
The "Khentkaus Problem" has a long history. In the 1930s, Selim Hassan proposed that Khentkaus was a daughter of Menkaure, and that she was married first to Shepseskaf and later to Userkaf. Ventikiev was the first to suggest that the title mwt nswt bity nswt bity should be read as, "The Mother of two Kings of Upper and Lower Egypt".

Hermann Junker believed that the existence of the pyramid town that is part of her burial temple complex, suggested that Khentkaus was a very important person and that her title should be read as, "the King of Upper and Lower Egypt and the Mother of the King of Upper and Lower Egypt", indicating that she served as king. He suggested that she was the daughter of Menkaure and the sister of Shepseskaf.

Ludwig Borchardt suggested that Shepseskaf was a commoner who married the king's daughter, Khentkaus. He further thought that Sahure and Neferirkare Kakai were sons of Shepseskaf and Khentkaus. Borchardt conjectured that Userkaf was an outsider who was able to take the throne because Sahure and Neferirkare were too young to ascend the throne when Shepseskaf died.

Bernhard Grdseloff proposed that Shepseskaf and Khentkaus were the son and daughter of Menkaure, and that Userkaf was a prince from a collateral branch of the royal family who came to the throne when he married the royal widow and mother of the heirs to the throne, Khentkaus.

Hartwig Altenmüller suggested that Khentkaus was none other than the lady, Rededjet, mentioned in the Westcar Papyrus. He suggested that Khentkaus was the mother of Userkaf, Sahure, and Neferirkare Kakai.

Arielle P. Kozloff theorized that Shepseskaf was the son of Menkaure with a minor wife who came to the throne after the death of the king's son, Khuenre. He also theorized that Shepseskaf married Menkaure's daughter, Khentkaus, and suggested that upon the premature death of Shepseskaf, Khentkaus married the High Priest of Re to secure the throne for her two sons.

Vivienne Callender asserted that since the name of Khentkaus did not appear in a cartouche she never ruled Egypt. Instead, Callender preferred to read the mwt nswt bity nswt bity title as, the Mother of Two Kings of Upper and Lower Egypt. She thought Khentkaus had to be a daughter of Menkaure and the wife of either Shepseskaf or Thampthis. She pointed to Userkaf and Neferirkare as the two sons referred to in Khentkaus's title.

== Tomb ==
Khentkaus was buried in Giza. Her tomb is known as LG 100 and G 8400 and is located in the Central Field that is part of the Giza Necropolis. The pyramid complex of Khentkaus includes her pyramid, a boat pit, a valley temple, and a pyramid town.

=== The pyramid complex of Khentkaus I ===
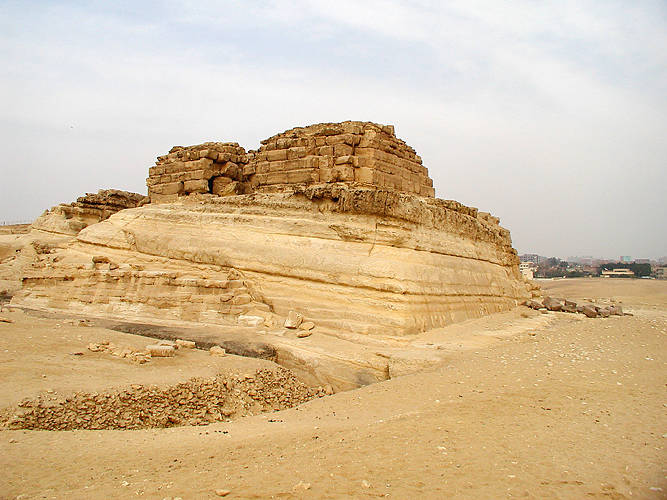
Tomb of Khentkaus I in Giza

The pyramid complex of Khentkaus consists of the pyramid, a chapel, a solar boat, the pyramid city, a water tank, and granaries. The pyramid originally was described in the nineteenth century as an unfinished pyramid and it had been conjectured that it belonged to king Shepseskaf. The pyramid was excavated by Selim Hassan starting in 1932. The tomb was given the number LG 100 by Lepsius.

The chapel consisted of a main hall and an inner chapel. A passage cut in the floor of the inner chapel leads to the burial chamber. The floor of the chapel was covered in Tura limestone. The walls were covered in relief, but the scenes are very badly damaged. Relief fragments were found in the debris when the tomb was excavated by Selim Hassan. The passage to the burial chamber and the chamber itself were lined with red granite. The passageway is 5.6 m long and descends below the main structure of the pyramid. The burial chamber is large and most closely resembles the burial chamber of king Shepseskaf in Saqqara.

The burial chamber possibly housed an alabaster sarcophagus; many pieces were found in the sand and debris that filled the chamber. The chamber also contained a small scarab made of a brown limestone. Its craftsmanship appears to connect the scarab to the Twelfth Dynasty. The presence of the scarab leads some to believe that her tomb was reused for later burials.

Her solar boat is located to the southwest of the pyramid. A pit measuring some 30.25 m long and 4.25 m deep was cut into the rock. The prow and stern of the boat were upraised and the boat appears to have had a roof. It may represent the night-boat of the sun-god Ra. If so, there may be an accompanying day-boat, yet to be found.

Immediately to the east of the pyramid lies a pyramid city. The city is laid out along several streets that divide the city into groups of houses. These houses had their own magazines and granaries. The city was constructed from unbaked mud-brick, and surfaces were covered in a yellow plaster. The city was probably the home of the priests and servants of the pyramid complex. The pyramid city was constructed toward the end of the Fourth Dynasty or beginning of the Fifth Dynasty and seems to have been functioning well into the Sixth Dynasty.

=== The valley temple of Khentkaus I ===
A causeway connects the pyramid chapel to the valley temple of Khentkaus. The temple lies close to the valley temple of Menkaure, which suggests a close relationship between Khentkaus and Menkaure. In front of the temple a small structure referred to as the "washing tent" of Khentkaus was discovered. This structure was the location where her body would have been taken to be purified before being embalmed. The debris filling this chamber contained many fragments of stone vessels, potsherds, and flint instruments. The floor is the opening of a limestone drain which runs downward under the ground for a distance of 7–20 m., emptying into a large, rectangular basin. The drain is covered by arched sections of the same material, the whole forming an almost circular stone pipe. Although by no means the oldest subterranean water-channel known in Egyptian funerary architecture, according to Hassan, it is the earliest of this particular type and construction.

The valley temples of Khentkaus and Menkaure were both partially constructed of mud-brick and finished with white limestone and alabaster. The main entrance is located on the northern side, which is a departure from the more common situation where the main entrance is located to the east. Entering the valley temple from the main entrance, one would walk up a “wide brick-paved causeway which runs up from the valley in a westerly direction.” The doorway was embellished with a portico held up by two columns. Once one enters the doorway, “The doorway opens into a vestibule, the roof of which was supported upon four columns. Near the doorway a statue of king Khafre (father of Menkaure) once stood. Remains of a statue of a king (possibly Khafra) and the body of a sphinx statue were found in the vestibule of the temple. The vestibule opens up to a court which in turn led to the magazines."
