= Selim Hassan =

Egyptian Egyptologist

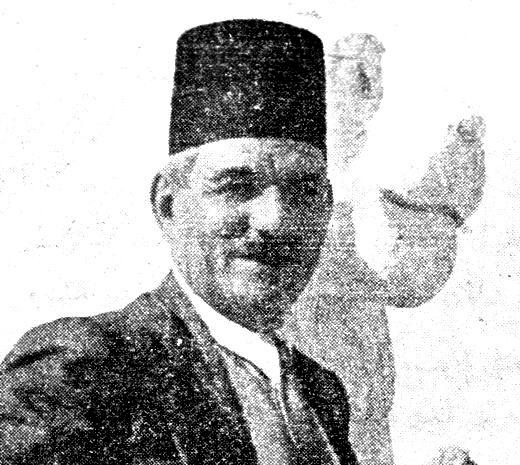
- Born: 15 April 1886; Mit Nagi, Mit Ghamr, Dakahlia, Egypt
- Died: 1961 (aged 74–75)

Selim Hassan (Arabic: سليم حسن; born on 15 April 1886 – 1961) was an Egyptian Egyptologist.

He was the first native Egyptian to be appointed Professor of Egyptology at the University of Cairo, a post he held from 1936 to 1939. He was then made Deputy-Director of the Antiquities Service.

He wrote the 18-volume Encyclopedia of Ancient Egypt in Arabic and supervised the excavation of many ancient Egyptian tombs under the auspices of Cairo University.

== Early life and education ==
Selim Hassan was born in Mit-Nagi, on April 15, 1886. He was a student at Higher Teacher's College, Cairo under Kamal Pasha. In 1912 he became a teacher and in 1921 obtained a post in the Egyptian Museum as assistant keeper. Between 1923 and 1927, he studied at the Ecole Pratique des Hautes Etudes in Paris. In 1935, he received a Ph.D. from Vienna University.

== Career ==
Hassan was the first Egyptian to be appointed as a professor of Egyptology at the University of Cairo, where he taught from 1928 to 1936. Next, he was appointed as deputy director of the Egyptian Antiquities Service, from 1936 to 1939. In this post, he was responsible for overseeing the care of all monuments in the Nile valley.

== Excavations ==
Inspired by the archaeological work of Newberry and Junker, Hassan began his career in excavation by clearing some mastabas in the Giza necropolis in 1929 and continued until 1939. Later, he cleared the Great Sphinx of Giza and its temple, including the great amphitheatre around it, in hopes of protecting it from burial by sand.

== Giza ==
Selim Hassan excavated the Central Field, Giza from 1929 to 1939. He found and recorded many mastabas and discovered several undisturbed tombs. The results of his excavations were published in ten volumes. From about five missions working and excavating the cemeteries at Giza his work is regarded for science the most important one. George Reisner, working at the same cemetery published only little of his results. Hermann Junker, also working at Giza, concentrated in his publication very much on architecture with long chapters better placed in articles on different subjects, but not on his finds. The publications of Selim Hassan concentrates on the find and the archaeology, including the pottery found, often only just mentioned by Junker.

== Encyclopedia of Ancient Egypt ==
The Encyclopedia of Ancient Egypt is considered the definitive historical reference for Ancient Egypt. Hassan wrote it in Arabic and worked on it for most of his life. The first volume is entitled "From Prehistory to the End of the Ahnasy Era."

== Recognition ==
An exhibition, Selim Hassan: Legend of Egyptology, was presented in 2015. It featured an archive of manuscripts and photographs of Hassan's excavations in Giza and Saqqara. Hassan's book, "The Causeway of King Unas (Wanis)", was displayed. Also documented are the attempted rescue of Nubian monuments and maps Hassan drew and photographs made of the monuments. Photographs of Hassan, taken during excavations, and featuring his family, friends and colleagues, were also displayed.

== Works ==
- Excavations at Giza: Considered his Magnum Opus
- The Sphinx: Its History in the Light of Recent Excavations
- Excavations at Saqqara, 1937-1938 / by Selim Hassan; re-edited by Zaky Iskander.
- The Great Pyramid of Khufu and its Mortuary Chapel: with names and titles vols. I-X of the excavations at Giza / by Selimuium

== Translated works ==
- The dawn of conscience. Arabic. 1956
- Fajr al-ḍamīr [manuscript] / taʼlīf Jaymis Hanrī Baristid; tarjamat Salīm Ḥasan.
