= Khufukhaf II =

Khufukhaf
- Chief of the troop
- Died: c. 2430 BC
- Burial: mastaba G 7150 at Giza
- Spouse: Khentkaus
- Children: Khaf-Khufu and Sety-Ptah

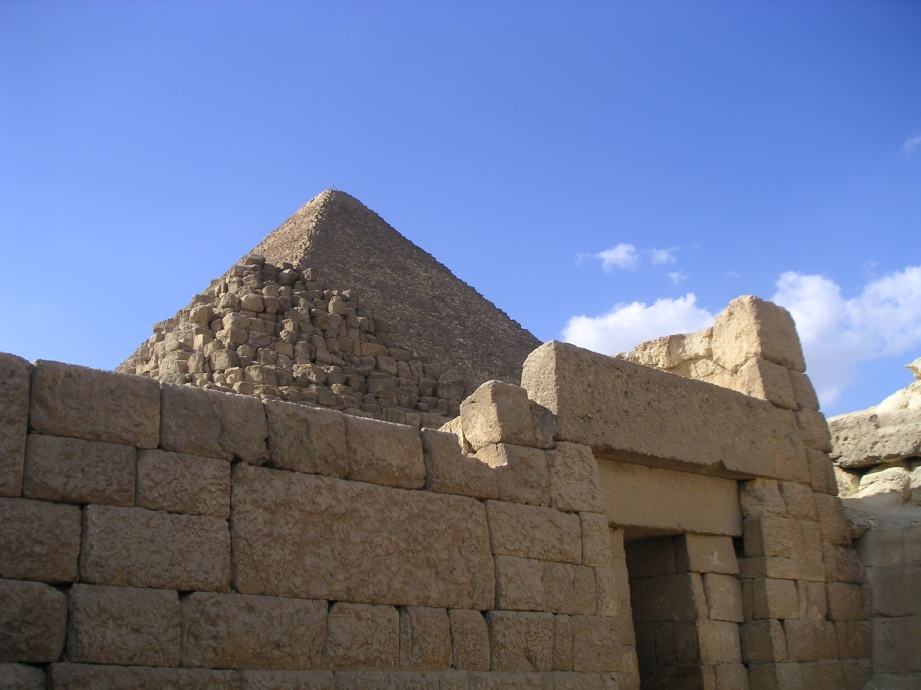
Mastaba (tomb) of Khufukhaf II

Khufukhaf II (meaning "Khufu raised him"; died c. 2430 BC) was an ancient Egyptian high official during the Old Kingdom period. Likely born during the 4th Dynasty, Khufukhaf died during the reign of king Nyuserre Ini of the 5th Dynasty. In modern Egyptology, he is also called Khufukhaf B or Khufukhaf the Younger to distinguish him from his probable father or grandfather Khufukhaf I.

== Family ==
Khufukhaf bore the title of "king's son", a title which is however purely honorary and does not represent a true filiation. Rather, it is possible that he was a son of vizier Khufukhaf I, a son of Khufu who served as such during Khafre's reign. However, the only known sons of Khufukhaf I's were Wetka and Iuenka. Reisner claimed that Khufukhaf II was a grandson of Khufukhaf I and thus a son of either Wetka, Iuenka or Khufukhaf I's daughter. It is most possible that Khufukhaf II was a grandson, and not the son of Khufukhaf I. This however remains conjectural.

The wife of Khufukhaf II is known to have been princess Khentkaus. She bore the title of King's daughter of his body indicating in all likeliness that she was a daughter of a king. Khentkaus and Khufukhaf had two sons: Khaf-Khufu and Sety-Ptah.

== Career ==
As the son or grandson of a vizier, Khufukhaf II had a career laid out for him in the high administration of the Ancient Egyptian state. He bore a number of titles:

- Chief of the troop
- Chief of the western deserts
- Chief of the king's works
- Pure priest of the king
- Great of the ten from Upper Egypt
- Priest of the God
- Priest of Maat
- Priest of Ra in the temple Setibre, sun temple of Neferirkare Kakai
- Priest of Khufu
- He whose position is foremost
- Chief of secrets of his Lord
- King's son.

Khufukhaf died during the reign of pharaoh Nyuserre Ini.

== Tomb ==
Khufukhaf II was buried in mastaba G 7150 at Giza. In the tomb is mentioned his family - wife and sons. Persons who are also mentioned are Pasherimut, child of Tadihor-[...]etef and Pedimutemiteru; he was a scribe.
