= Nefertkau =

Nefertkau is the name of several ancient Egyptian women:

- Nefertkau I, a daughter of Pharaoh Sneferu,
- Nefertkau II, wife of Prince Khufukhaf I
- Nefertkau III, possibly a granddaughter of Pharaoh Khufu.
- Nefertkau, a daughter of Nefertkau III and Iynefer II.
