= Khuenre =

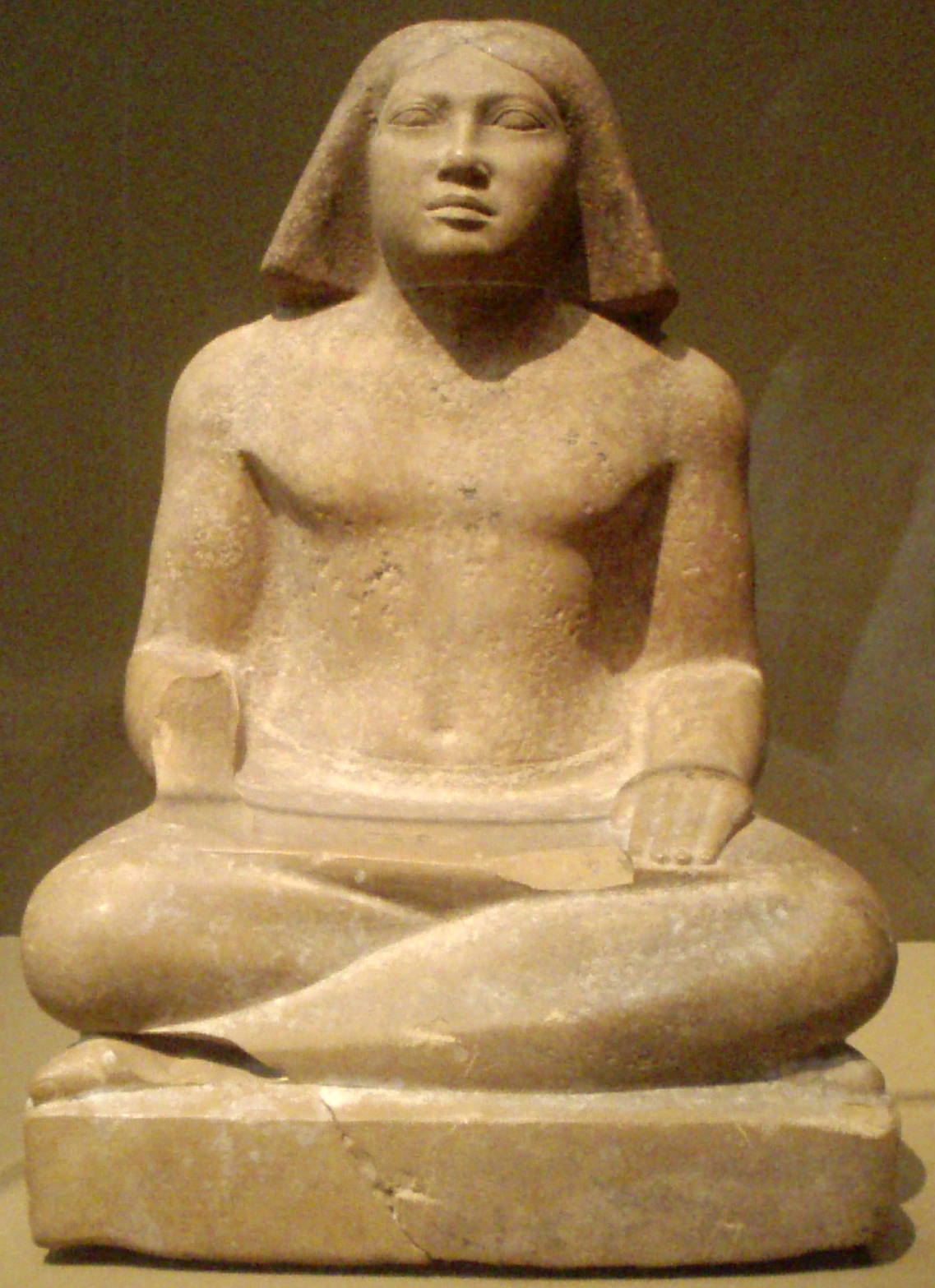
- Statue of prince Khuenre, Boston, Massachusetts
- Burial place: Tomb MQ 1 at Giza
- Years active: c. 2525 BC
- Parent: Khamerernebty II

Khuenre (Khuenra) (fl. c. 2525 BC) was a Prince of ancient Egypt of the 4th Dynasty, named after the Sun god Ra.

== Biography ==
He may have been a son of King Menkaure and was a son of his sister, Queen Khamerernebty II. He was a grandson of Khafre and Khamerernebty I and great-grandson of Khufu, the king who built the Great Pyramid of Giza.

He was a secretary and "sole companion of his father".

He was the eldest son of his parents, but he was not Menkaure’s successor as he predeceased him. Thus, Menkaure was succeeded by Shepseskaf.

Khuenre is buried in Menkaure’s cemetery (MQ 1). He is depicted as a young boy standing in front of his seated mother on the south wall.
