= Bat (goddess) =

Ancient Egyptian cow goddess

Name in hieroglyphs
G29 t Y8 G7

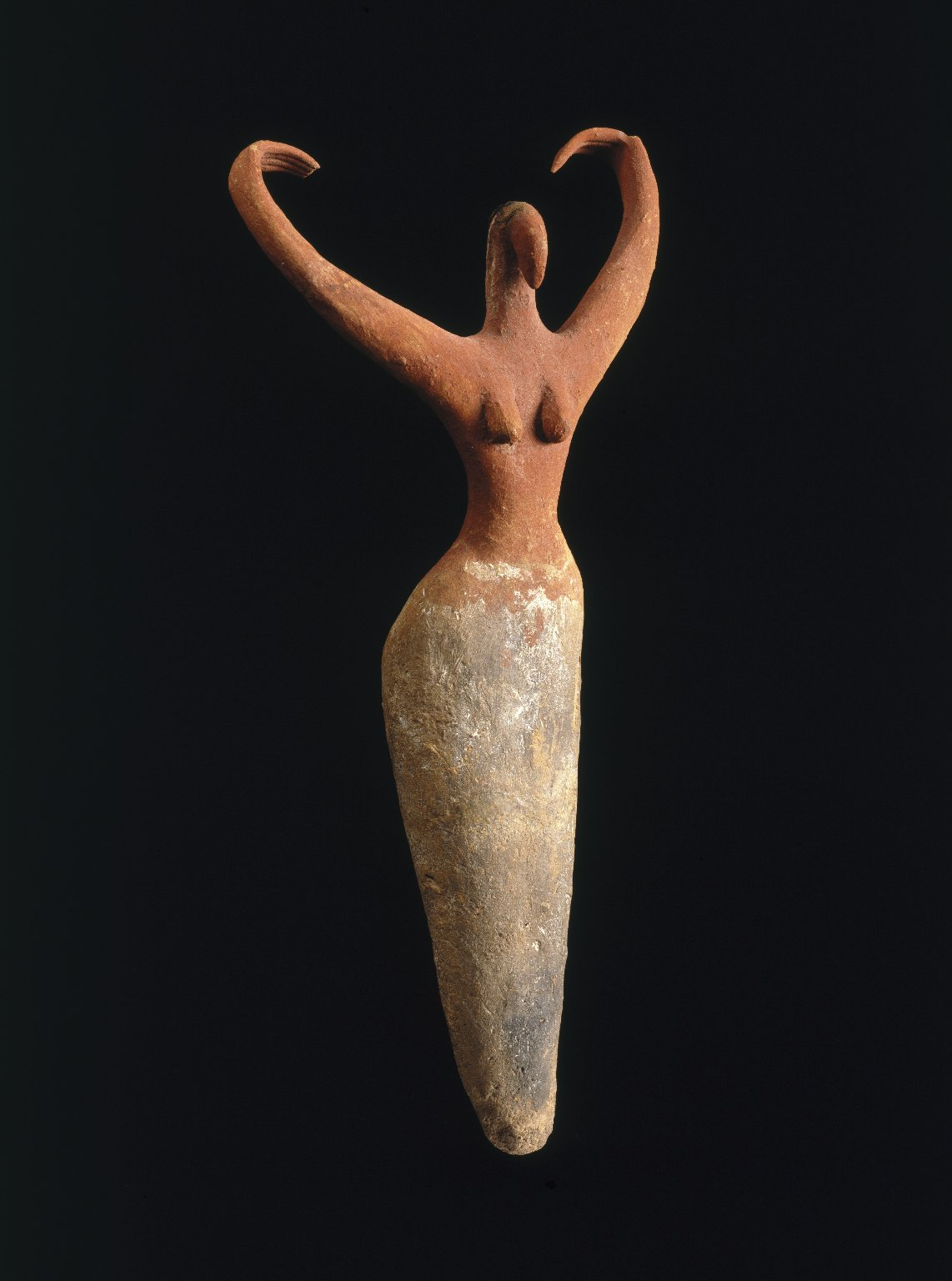
This painted terracotta Naqada figure of a woman is interpreted as representing Bat, c. 3500–3400 BCE - Brooklyn Museum

Bat is a cow goddess in Egyptian mythology who was depicted as a human face with cow ears and horns or as a woman. Evidence of the worship of Bat exists from the earliest records of the religious practices in ancient Egypt. By the time of the Middle Kingdom, after the unification of Lower Egypt and Upper Egypt, her identity and attributes were subsumed within that of the goddess Hathor, a similar goddess worshipped in another nome. The imagery of Bat persisted throughout the history of ancient Egypt on the sistrum, a sacred instrument that remained associated with religious practices.

== Worship ==
The worship of Bat dates to earliest times in ancient Egypt and may have its origins in Late Paleolithic cattle herding cultures. Bat was the chief goddess of Seshesh, otherwise known as Hu or Diospolis Parva, the 7th nome of Upper Egypt.

=== Name ===
The epithet, Bat, may be linked to the word ba with the feminine suffix 't'. A person's ba roughly equates to one's personality or emanation and often is translated as 'soul'.

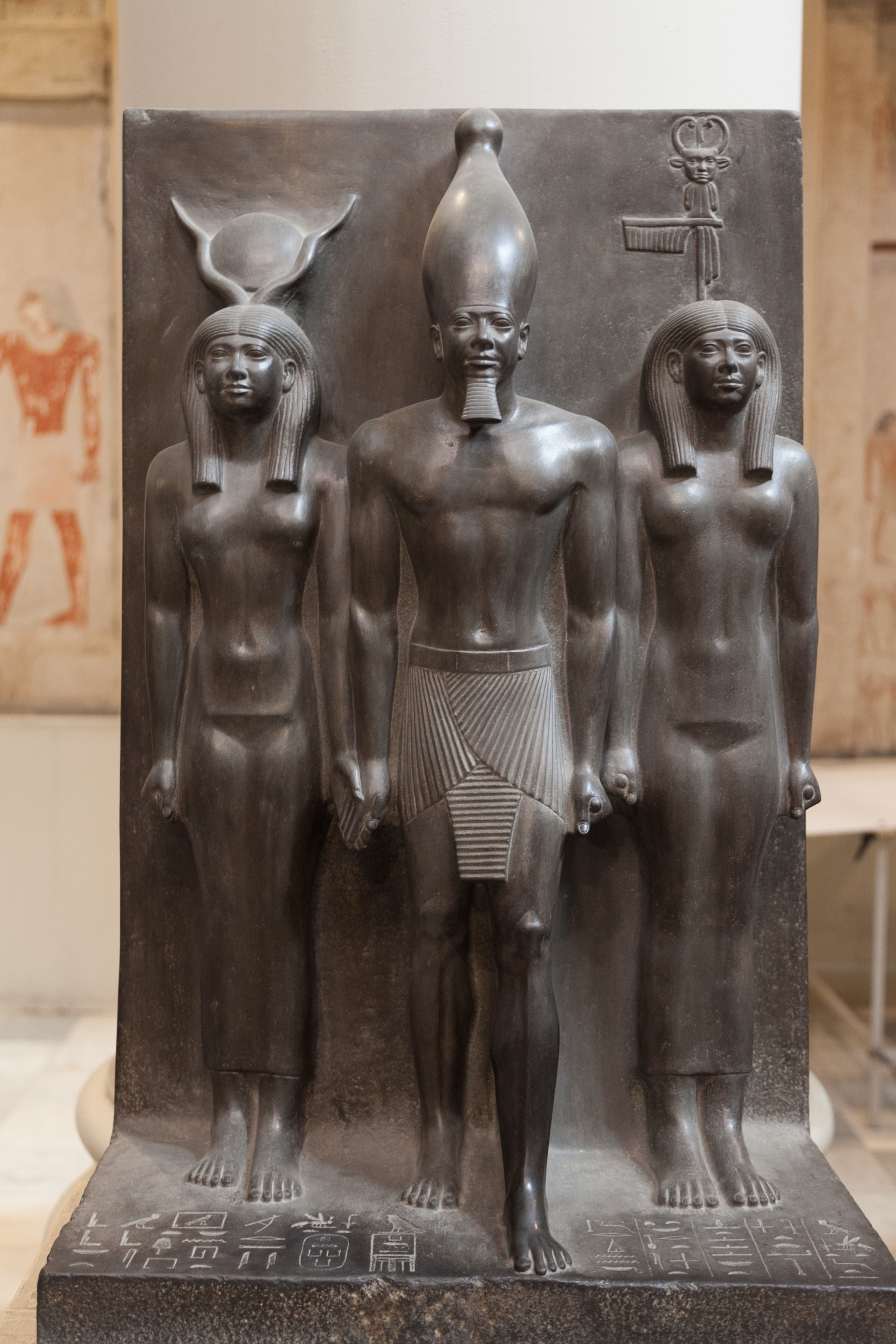
Both Bat (right) and Hathor (left) flank Menkaure in this Fourth Dynasty triad statue, c. 2530 B.C. The goddesses provide the authority for him to be king and are identified by their crowns. The emblem on Bat's crown represents the sistrum, although the crown also includes her zoomorphic face and the feather of Ma'at.

== Depictions in ancient Egyptian culture ==
Although it was rare for Bat to be clearly depicted in painting or sculpture, some notable artifacts (such as the upper portions of the Narmer Palette) include depictions of the goddess in bovine form. In other instances she was pictured as a celestial bovine creature surrounded by stars, or as a woman. More commonly, Bat was depicted on amulets, with a human face, but with bovine features, such as the ears of a cow and the inward-curving horns of the type of cattle first herded by the Egyptians.

Bat became strongly associated with the sistrum and the center of her cult was known as the "Mansion of the Sistrum". The sistrum is an ankh-shaped musical instrument, which was one of the most frequently used sacred instruments in ancient Egyptian temples. Some instruments would include depictions of Bat, with her head and neck as the handle and base and with its rattles placed between her horns. The imagery is repeated on each side of the instrument, having two faces, as mentioned in the Pyramid Texts:.

I am Praise; I am Majesty; I am Bat with Her Two Faces; I am the One Who Is Saved, and I have saved myself from all things evil.

=== Relation to Hathor ===
The imagery of Bat as a divine cow was remarkably similar to that of Hathor, a parallel goddess from another nome. In two dimensional images, both goddesses often are depicted straight on, facing the onlooker and not in profile in accordance with the characteristic Egyptian convention. The significant difference in their depictions is that the horns of Bat curve inward and those of Hathor curve outward slightly. It is possible that this could be based in the different breeds of cattle herded at different times.

Hathor's cult center was in the 6th Nome of Upper Egypt, adjacent to the 7th nome where Bat was the cow goddess, which may indicate that once they were the same goddess in Predynastic Egypt. By the Middle Kingdom, the cult of Hathor had again absorbed that of Bat in a manner similar to other mergers in the Egyptian pantheon.

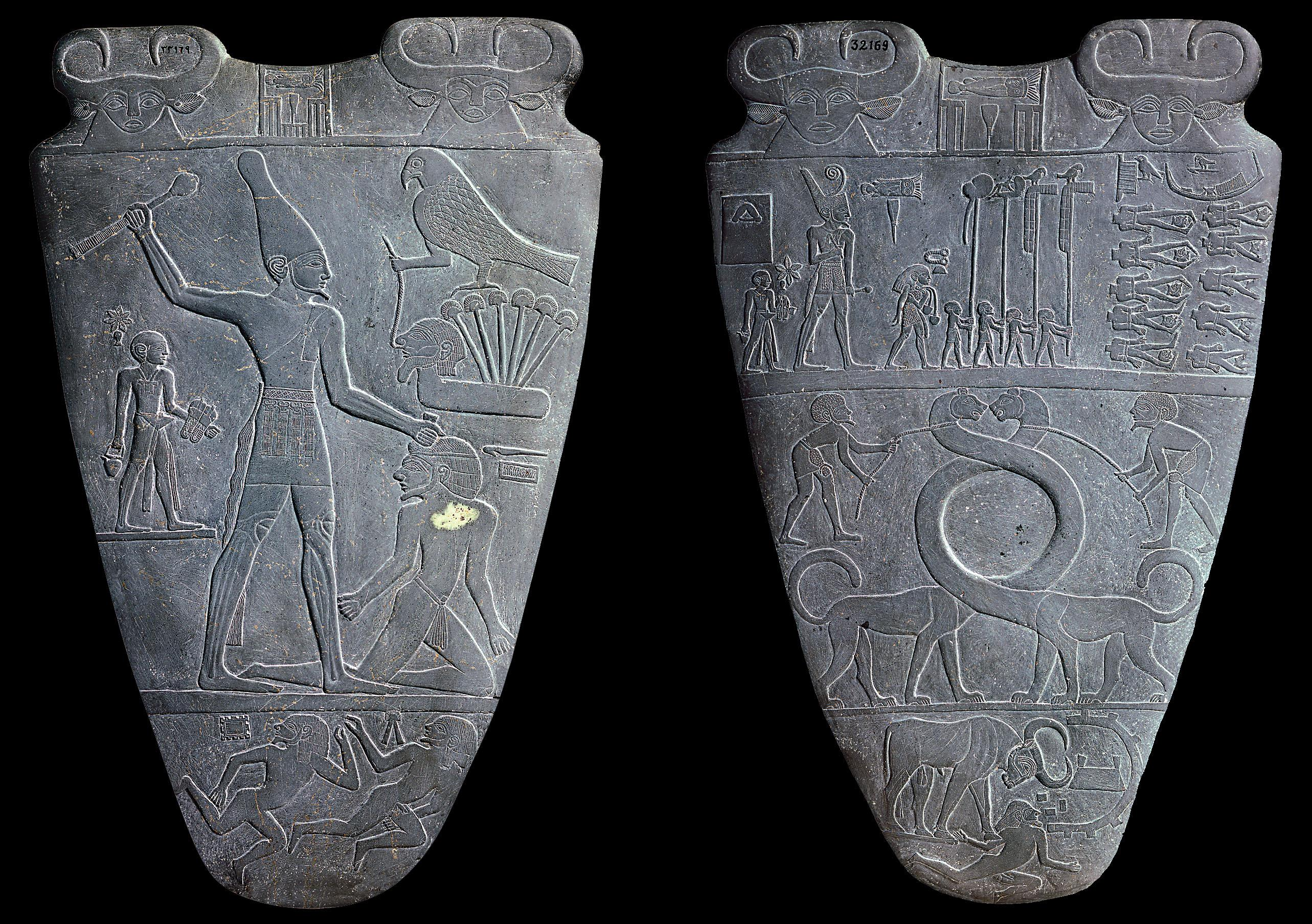
Bat flanks the top of both sides of the Narmer Palette, c. 3200–3100 BC

== See also ==
- Asherah
- List of Egyptian deities
- Cattle in religion and mythology
