= Anput =

Ancient Egyptian goddess

Name in hieroglyphs
M17 N35 Q3 E15 X1 H8
- Symbol: jackal, canopic jars, mummy gauze
- Consort: Anubis

Anput is a goddess in ancient Egyptian religion. Her name is written in hieroglyphs as jnpwt (reconstructed in Middle Egyptian as /ʔan.ˈpa.wat/ or /jan.ˈpa.wat/). In English, her name also is rendered as Anuput, Anupet, Input, Inpewt, and Yineput. As the female counterpart of her husband, Anubis, who was known as jnpw to the Egyptians, Anput's name ends in a feminine "t" suffix when seen as jnpwt.

She is also depicted as a woman, with a headdress showing a jackal recumbent upon a feather, as seen in the statue of the divine triad of Hathor, Menkaure, and Anput. She is occasionally depicted with the body of a woman and the head of a jackal, but this is very rare.

As the consort of Anubis, Anput is a goddess of the dead, presiding over funerals and mummification. Additionally, she is a goddess of protection and also represented in relation to the desert, which was the realm of the dead for Ancient Egyptians. Unlike Anubis, Anput does not have a prominent role in Egyptian mythology, but she is thought to watch over the body of the god of the afterlife, Osiris, assuming the role of his protector for the duration of his death.

== Mythology ==
Anput, the ancient Egyptian goddess, was depicted either as fully human (left) or with the head of a jackal

Anput is the female counterpart of the god Anubis. She is also a goddess of the seventeenth nome of Upper Egypt. She is also considered the protector of the body of Osiris, the god of the afterlife.
