= Khentkaus =

xnt t kA kA kA s
Khentkaus
in hieroglyphs
Era: Old Kingdom
(2686–2181 BC)

Khentkaus (also Khentkawes and Khentakawess; Egyptian Ḫnt kȝw=s) was an ancient Egyptian given name. It may refer to several women lived during the Old Kingdom:

- Khentkaus I, queen of pharaoh Shepseskaf (4th Dynasty) or Userkaf (5th Dynasty)
- Khentkaus II, queen of pharaoh Neferirkare Kakai (5th Dynasty) and mother of pharaohs Neferefre and Nyuserre Ini
- Khentkaus III, possibly queen of pharaoh Neferefre (5th Dynasty)
- Princess Khentkaus, princess during the 4th Dynasty
