= Princess Khentkaus =

Khentkaus
- Years active: c. 2430 BC
- Spouse: Khufukhaf II
- Children: Khaf-Khufu and Sety-Ptah

See also Khentkaus I and Khentkaus II

Khentkaus (fl. c. 2430 BC) was an Ancient Egyptian princess. She lived during the 4th and 5th Dynasty. Her parents are unknown but since she bore the title "King's daughter of his body" her father is likely to have been a king, possibly Khafre. His son Menkaura had a daughter, Khentkaus I. Thus, Princess Khentkaus was possibly a daughter of Khafra and aunt of Khentkaus I.

Khentkaus married Prince Khufukhaf II. She had two sons with him: Khaf-Khufu and Sety-Ptah. Khentkaus was buried with her husband in the tomb G 7150 at Giza. She is depicted in the tomb.
