= Nefertkau II =

Ancient Egyptian noble lady

Nefertkau in hieroglyphs
nfr r&t D28 D28 D28
Nefertkau
Nfr.t kau

Nefertkau II was an Ancient Egyptian noble lady, the wife of Prince Khufukhaf I, son of pharaoh Khufu.

Nefertkau and Khufukhaf had several children including two sons named Wetka and Iuenka, as well as an unnamed daughter. Both sons Wetka and Iuenka appear in the tomb of Khufukhaf and Nefertkau offering papyrus. They are both are given the title King's son. An unnamed daughter is depicted behind her seated parents in the inner hall of the mastaba. It is possible that an official named Khufukhaf II is a third son of Khufukhaf I and Nefertkau.

== Tomb ==
Nefertkau was buried in G 7130 in Giza located in the east field which is part of the Giza Necropolis. The tomb was part of the double mastaba constructed for Nefertkau and her husband Khufukhaf I. According to Reisner the construction of the tomb would have started by year 17-24 of the reign of Khufu.

Nefertkau is depicted in the hall and the inner hall of the mastaba. Fragments of inscriptions remain showing Khufukhaf I was depicted several times in her chapel. Her son Wetka is depicted at least once.

Nefertkau was buried in shaft G 7130 B. The shaft contained fragments of a red granite sarcophagus. The burial chamber had been reused in the Ptolemaic period. When excavated, a shaft was found leading to the Isis's temple nearby and intrusive shabtis were found on the floor.
