= Menkaure triads =

Ancient Egyptian sculptures of pharaoh Menkaure

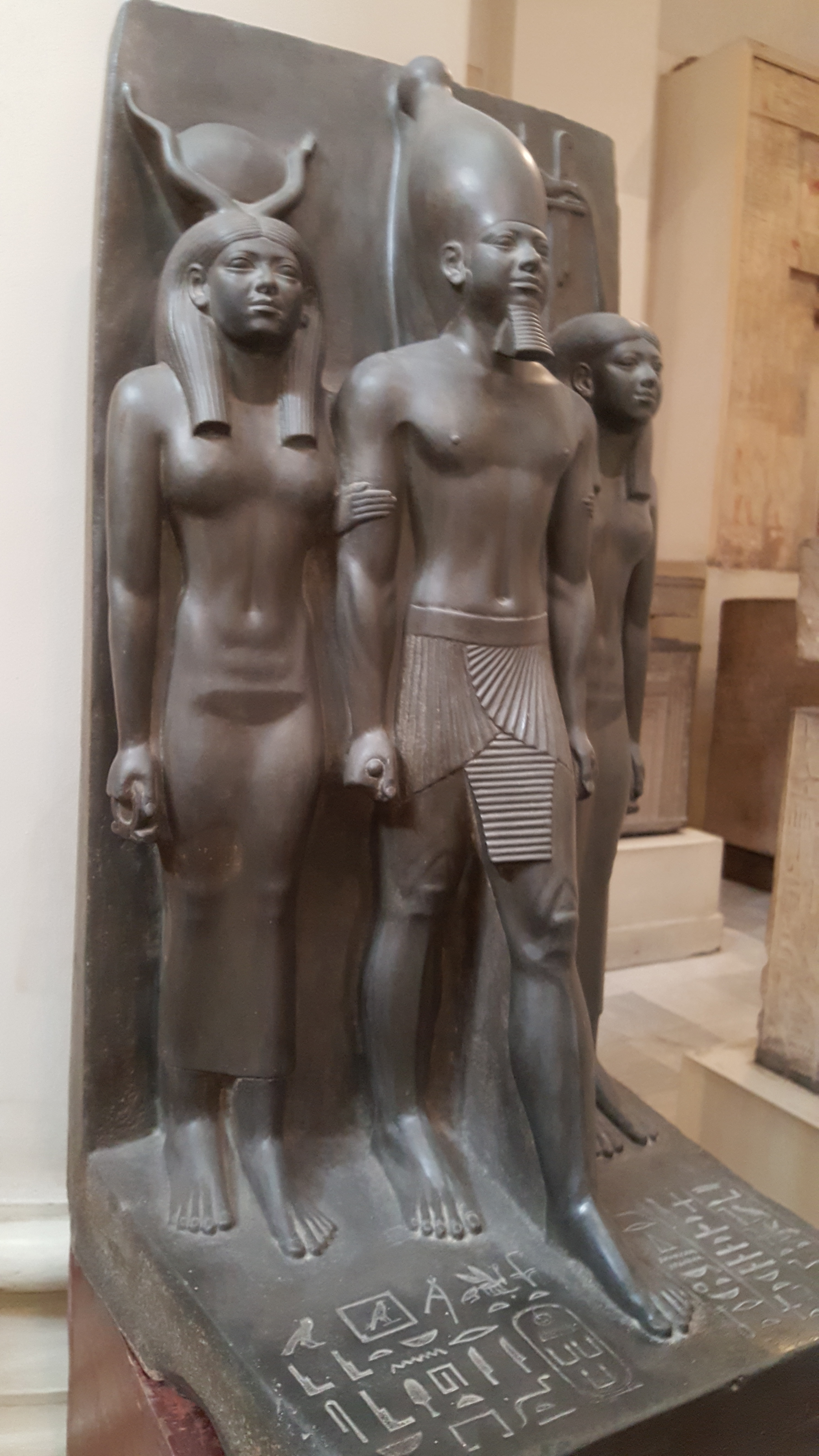
The triad with the two goddesses, now in the Egyptian Museum, Cairo

The Menkaure triads (also Triads of Menkaure) are a group of high reliefs in greywacke (a variety of sandstone; described as schist or slate in the older literature) depicting the pharaoh Menkaure standing, flanked by two figures. Menkaure, the fifth king of the Fourth Dynasty, reigned c. 2551–2523 BC. Five triads are known, all discovered at the same location, along with a statue of the pharaoh accompanied by his wife Khamerernebty II (Menkaure dyad).

== History ==
The sculpted groups, conventionally called triads, (Note: These statues are not triads in the strict sense of the term: they consist of a representation of the king protected by a goddess and accompanied by a personification of one of the regions of the country, or nomes. There is thus no intention of presenting the king as the offspring of a divine couple, as in the classic triads of the New Kingdom, in which the king takes the place of the divine child in the divine families of the great Egyptian cities of the period such as Thebes or Memphis.) were discovered during the excavation campaigns of 1908–1910 conducted by the American archaeologist George Andrew Reisner on behalf of Harvard University and the Museum of Fine Arts, Boston at the site of the valley temple of Menkaure at Giza, below the pharaoh's pyramid. During this campaign Reisner uncovered four well-preserved triads, found together in the storerooms south of the temple's offering chamber, each representing Menkaure differently but of analogous workmanship, together with a fifth in poor condition, found shattered on the northern side of the temple court; in 1910 a final statuary group followed, a dyad of the pharaoh accompanied by his wife. A small fragment of a sixth triad shows a seated figure in the centre and a standing male on the left and was also found in a thieves' hole of the Muslim period in the corridor where the four intact triads lay, beneath the dyad; its present location is unknown. Almost all of these statues are in a remarkable state of preservation and rank among the greatest surviving masterpieces of Old Kingdom sculpture; the pristine condition of the four intact triads is owed to their seclusion in the south-western corridor of the temple.

The interpretation of the original number of the triads has evolved. Reisner and, after him, William Stevenson Smith supposed that there may originally have been statues representing all the nomes of Upper and Lower Egypt (which numbered more than thirty), through which the deceased king could draw nourishment from the whole country. (Note: Announcing the discovery in 1910, Reisner reckoned twenty nomes of Upper Egypt and twenty-two of Lower Egypt, and concluded that there had originally been forty-two triads; he hoped that the still half-excavated valley temple might yet yield "the triads of Lower Egypt". El-Shahawy likewise reports that an original series matching the number of the nomes, between twenty-eight and forty-two, was once assumed, before being rejected on the grounds that the valley temple could not accommodate so many statues.) In 1974 the art historian Wendy Wood rejected this reconstruction, arguing that a series of more than thirty triads could not be meaningfully accommodated within the architecture of the valley temple, and proposed instead that the series numbered exactly eight, one for each of the eight portico chapels, representing only those nomes in which the cult of the goddess Hathor had been established under royal patronage.

Three of the four intact triads are kept in the Egyptian Museum in Cairo, displayed in gallery 47 on the ground floor. The fourth, likewise intact, together with the dyad and the fragmentary triad, are displayed in the Museum of Fine Arts, Boston. (Note: Under the older rules governing excavations in Egypt, which until the 1920s were financed and carried out chiefly by foreign missions, the products of these explorations were divided between the country mounting the expedition and Egypt. This explains why a number of pieces of great quality, such as the statues of Menkaure, are now held in the collections of major museums in Europe and the United States.)

== Description ==
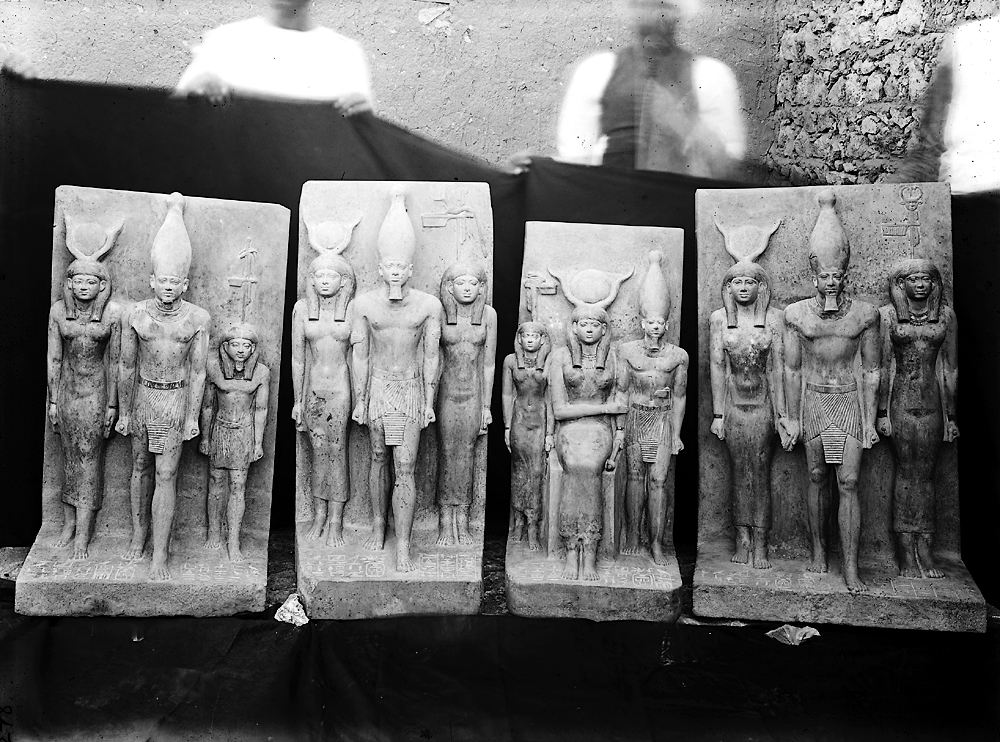
The four intact triads in 1908, at the time of their discovery. Photograph by George Andrew Reisner.

The triads measure between 85 and 95 centimetres (33 and 37 in) in height and between 43 and 50 centimetres (17 and 20 in) in width. All are composed on the same model with a few variations: the pharaoh stands at the centre, wearing the white crown of Upper Egypt, with the goddess Hathor on his right; in one of the groups, however (the one in Boston), it is the seated goddess who occupies the centre. Hathor is recognisable by the cow's horns framing the solar disc worn on her head. Her facial features resemble those of Menkaure's queen, Khamerernebty II, who appears beside the king in the dyad. On Menkaure's left, always slightly smaller in scale, stands the nome of a region of the kingdom, personified by a woman or a man without any particular attribute; only a large hieroglyph carved above the figure's head identifies it. The king stands slightly forward but remains, like the two other figures, engaged in the back slab. Like the goddess, he advances his left leg, whereas the nome figure sometimes keeps both feet together. Hieroglyphic formulae are carved on the flat surface of the base; the back of the slab is smooth. Like other Egyptian statuary, the triads were originally painted in conventional colours, which damp has almost entirely removed except on the necklaces, bracelets and the girdle bearing the king's name. The triads, the dyad and the fragments are all probably carved of greywacke from the Wadi Hammamat, although the stone cannot be identified with complete certainty without petrographic examination.

== Iconographic significance ==
The pharaoh is accompanied in each case by the goddess Hathor, goddess of the sky, of life and of love, shown standing or seated, and by a third figure personifying one of the nomes of the country, among them those of Thebes, Hermopolis Magna, Diospolis Parva and Cynopolis. The fifth nome could not be identified owing to the fragmentary state of the statue. Menkaure is shown standing, dressed in a ceremonial kilt. Athletic and eternally young, he adopts the attitude of walking, protected or encouraged by the gesture of the goddess Hathor. The relative scale of the figures reflects a hierarchy of divinity: the king, regarded during the Old Kingdom as a god himself (the living Horus, who became Osiris at death), is carved on a larger scale than his companions, while Hathor, more important than the divinities of the nomes, is in turn taller than the local figures. In the funerary context, the sculptures have traditionally been read as provision for the king's afterlife; Wood argued that this reading must be viewed as subsidiary to the celebration of the joint rule of the divine sovereigns, Hathor and Menkaure.

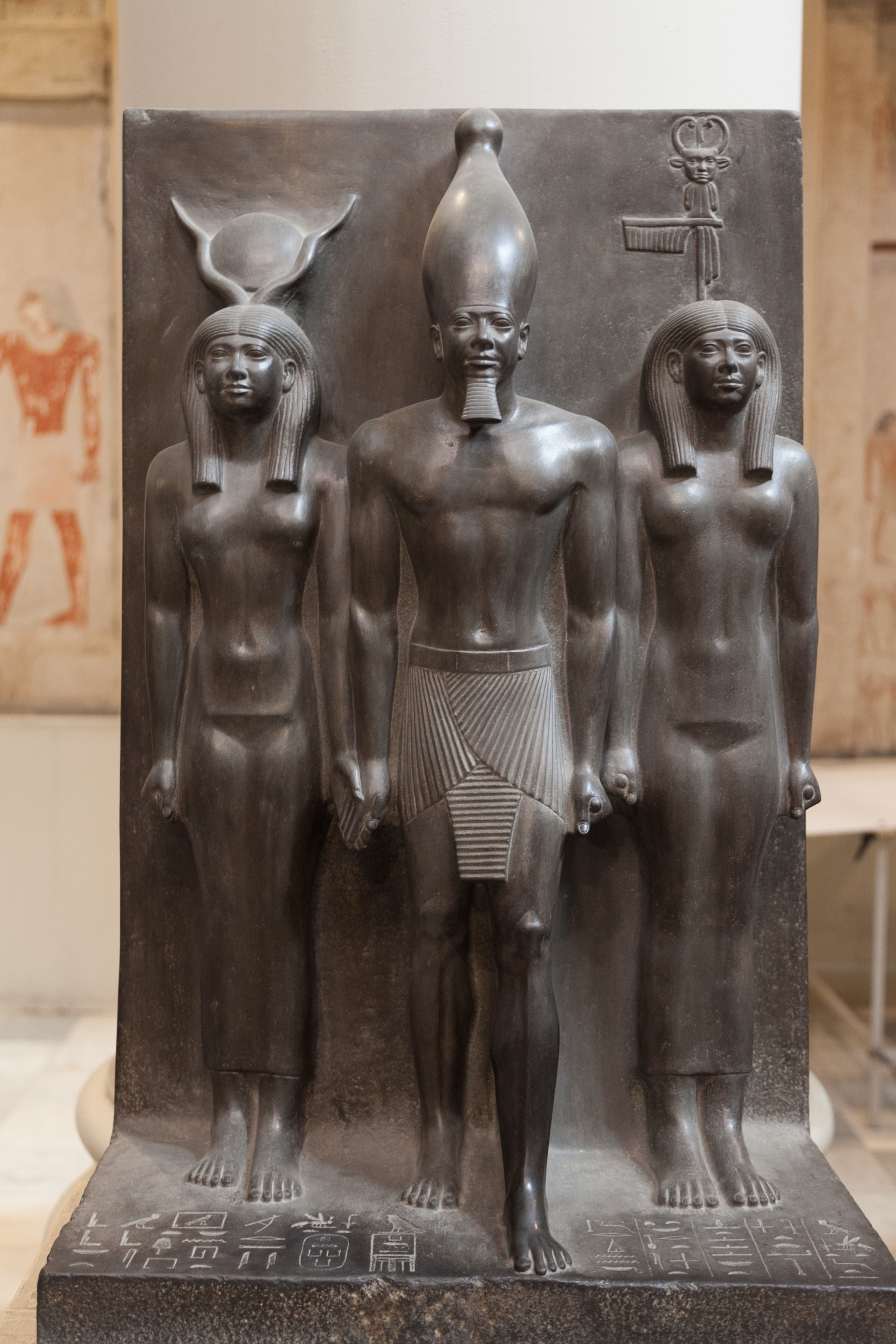
Triad of the nome of Diospolis Parva, 7th nome, the Bat nome, 95.5 × 48 cm. Egyptian Museum, Cairo, JE 46499.

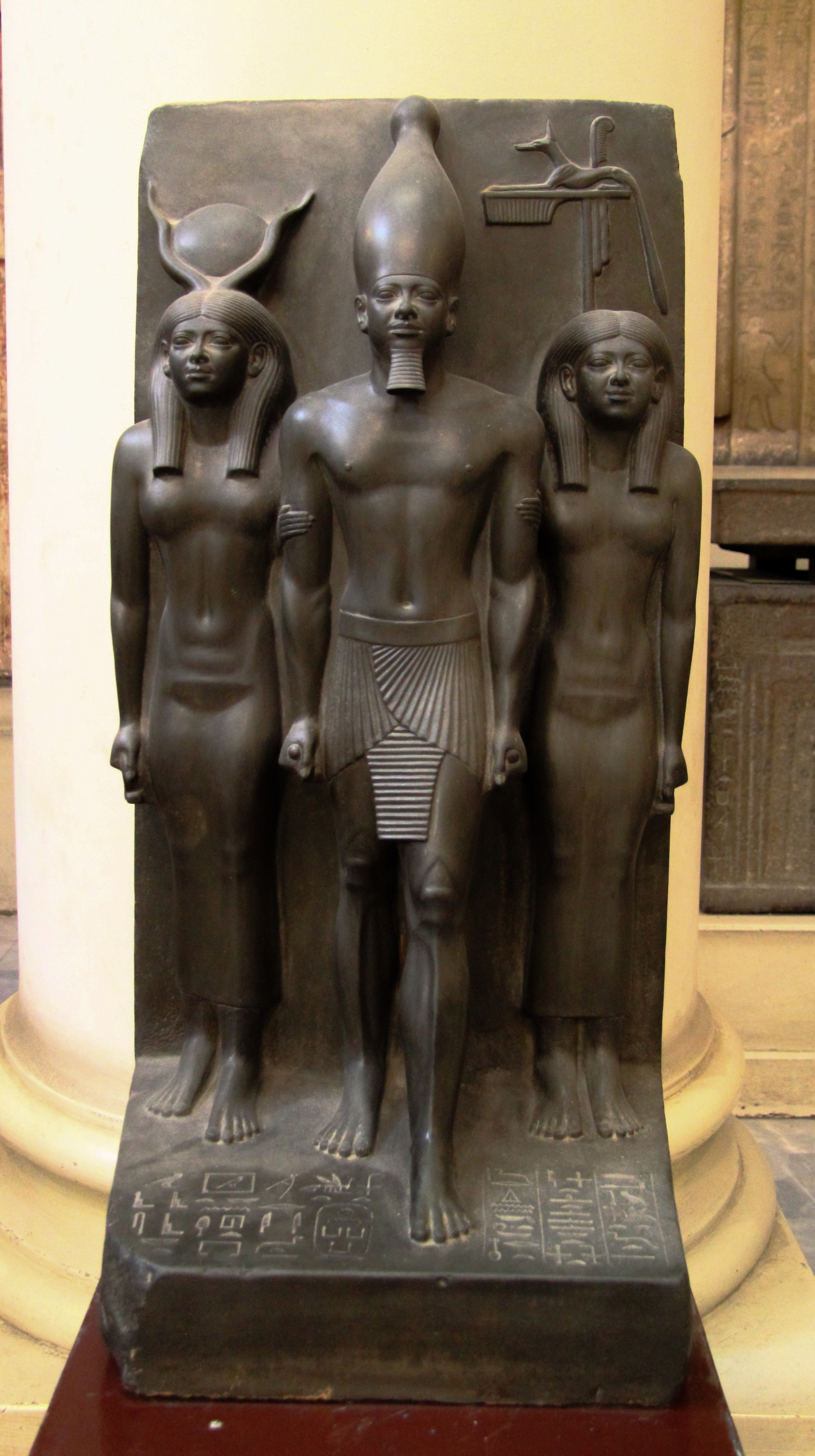
Triad of the 17th nome, Cynopolis, the Jackal nome. The nome figure passes an arm behind the king's back. 92.5 × 43 cm. Egyptian Museum, Cairo, JE 40679.

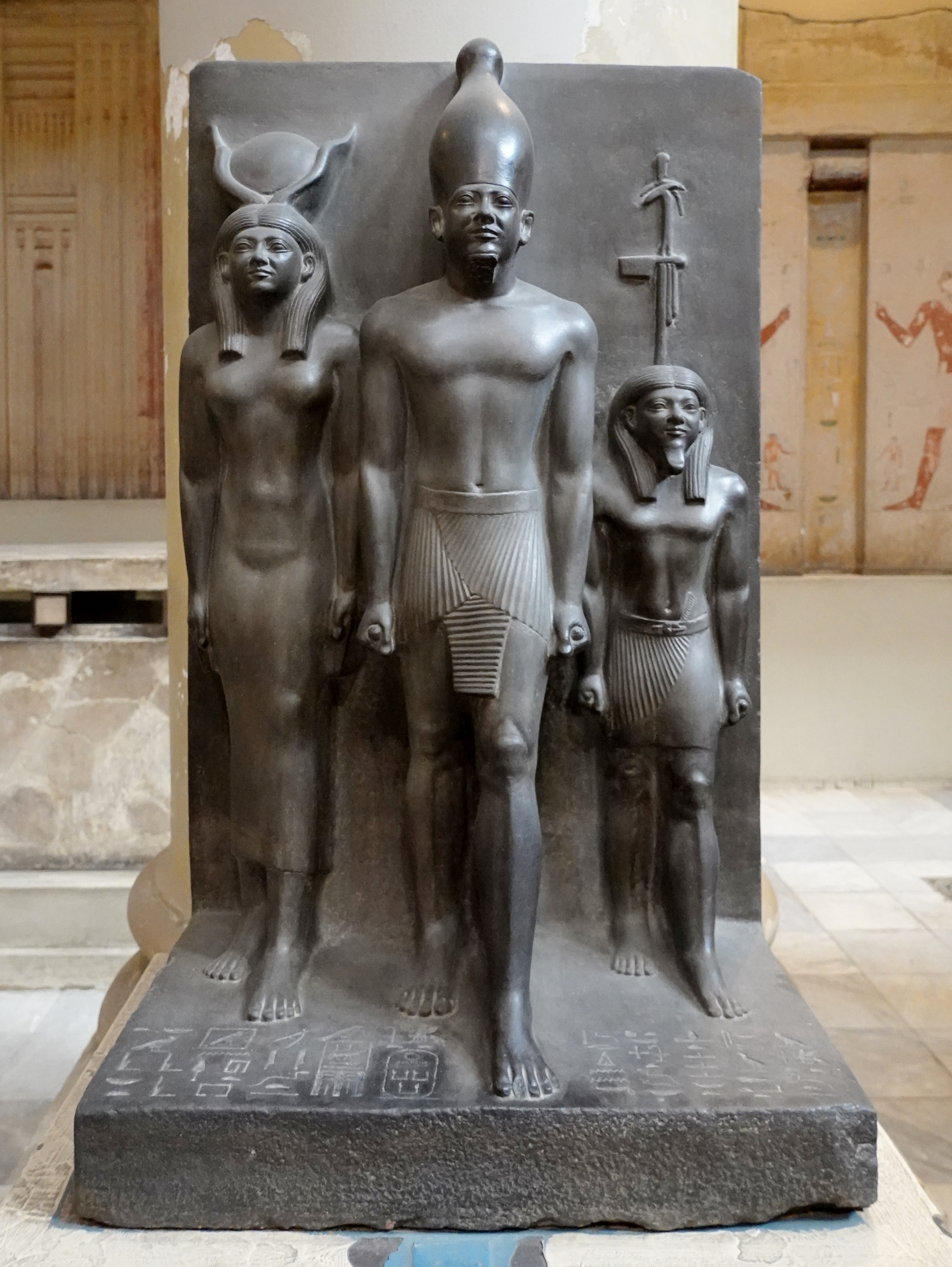
Triad of the 4th nome of Upper Egypt, Thebes, the Sceptre nome. The nome figure is a very small man. 93 × 47 cm. Egyptian Museum, Cairo, JE 40678.

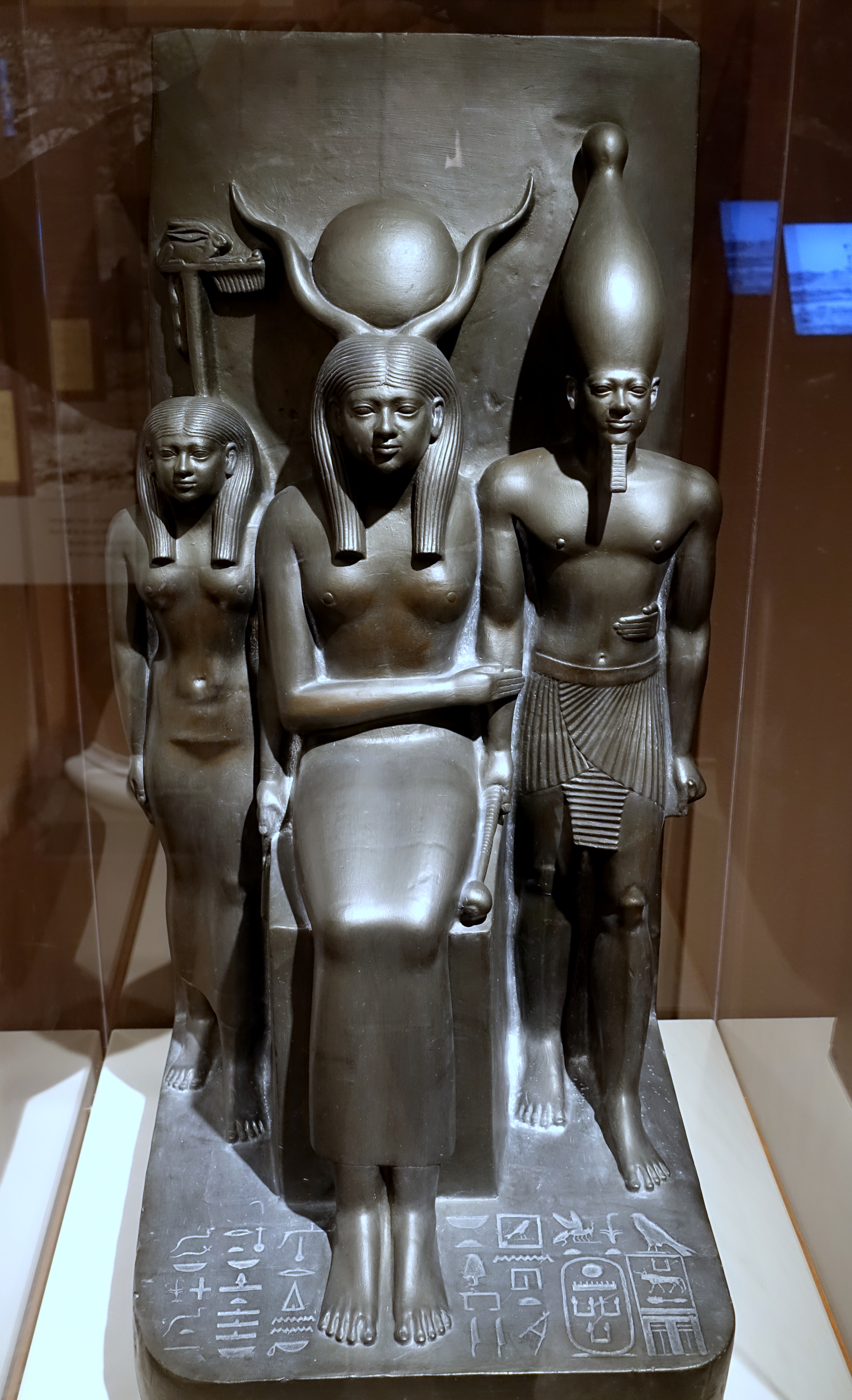
Triad with Hathor seated at the centre, 15th nome, Hermopolis Magna, the Hare nome, 84.5 × 43.5 cm. Museum of Fine Arts, Boston, MFA 09.200.

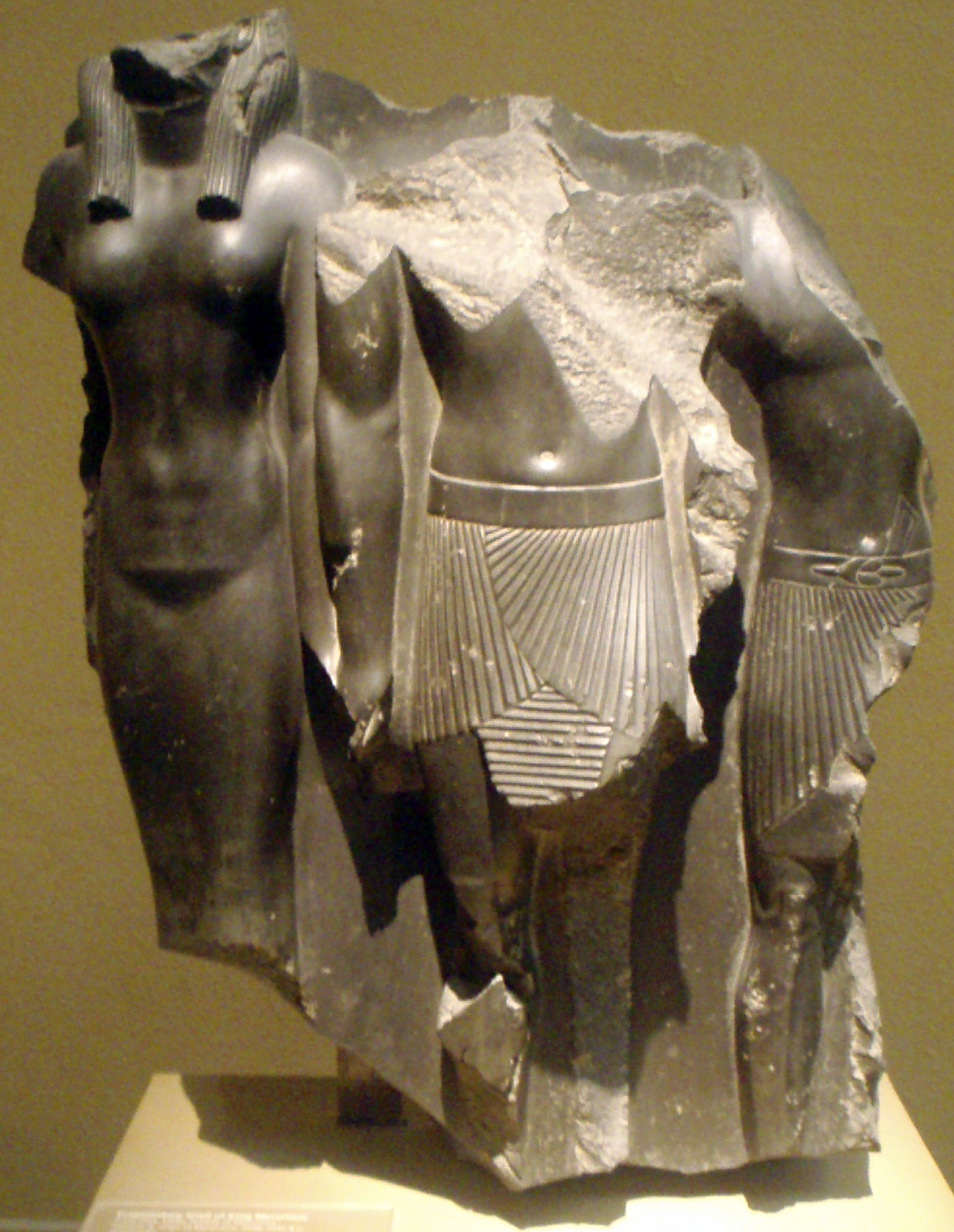
Incomplete triad. No evidence identifying a nome. Museum of Fine Arts, Boston, MFA 11.3147.

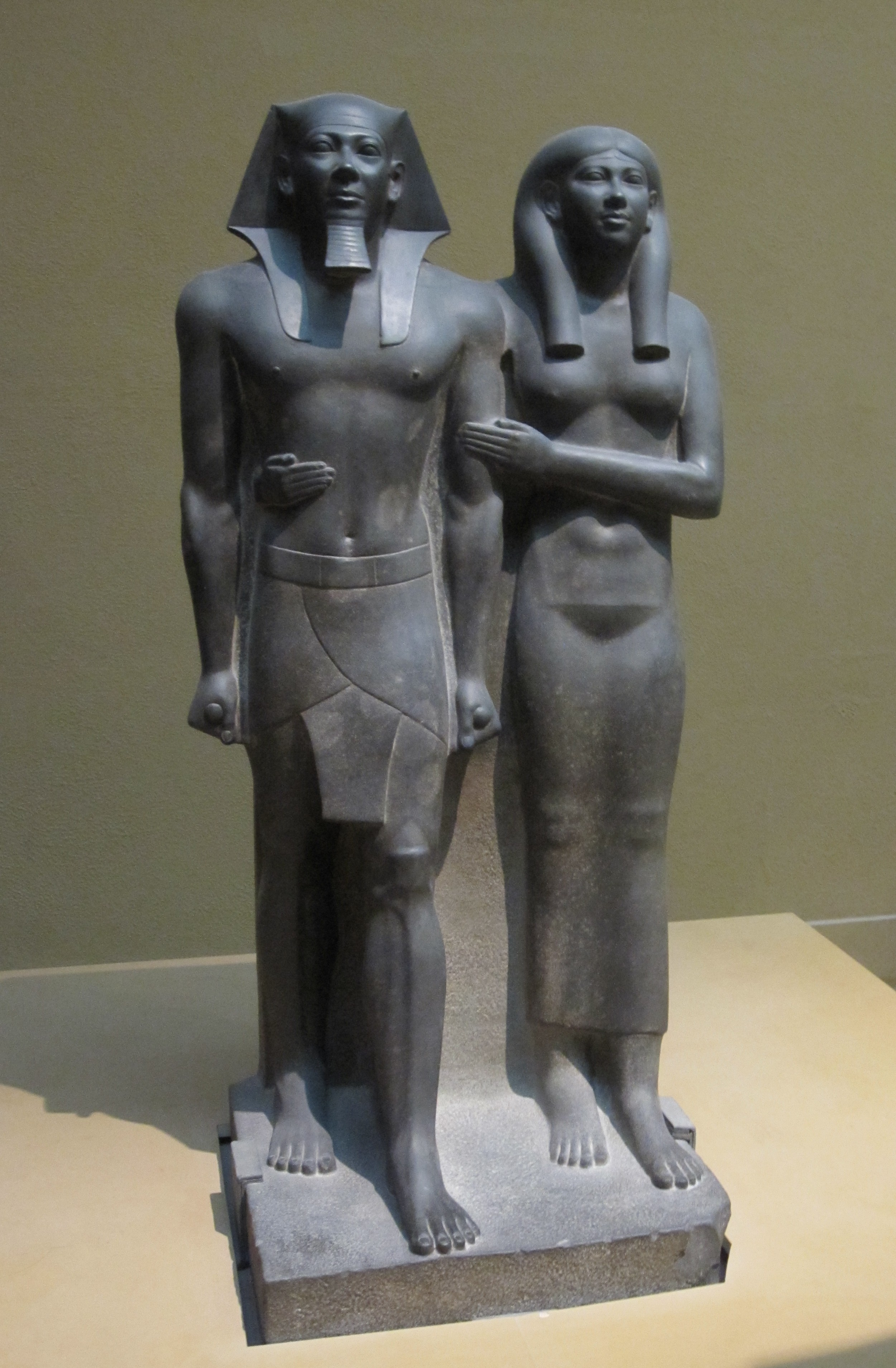
Menkaure and his wife Khamerernebty II; the height of the group is more than that of the triads. Museum of Fine Arts, Boston.

== Sources ==
- El-Shahawy, Abeer (2005). "Triads of King Menkaure". The Egyptian Museum in Cairo: A Walk Through the Alleys of Ancient Egypt. Photographs by Farid S. Atiya. Giza: Farid Atiya Press. pp. 55–59. ISBN 977-17-2183-6.
- Fiechter, Jean-Jacques (2001). Mykérinos, le dieu englouti [Menkaure, the Drowned God] (in French). Paris: Maisonneuve & Larose.
- Mayans, Carme (2 October 2018). "The pharaoh at the center of one of Egypt's biggest finds". National Geographic History.
- Reisner, George Andrew (10 February 1910). "Recent Explorations in Egypt" (PDF). The Independent. pp. 302–306.
- Wood, Wendy (1974). "A Reconstruction of the Triads of King Mycerinus" (PDF). The Journal of Egyptian Archaeology. 60: 82–93. doi:10.2307/3856172. JSTOR 3856172.
