= Iuenka =

- Prince of Egypt
- Father: Prince Khufukhaf I
- Mother: Princess Nefertkau II

Iuenka was a Prince of Egypt, a man with the title "king's son". He is also called Iunka, Yuwenka, Iun-ka and Iuwenka. He lived in the Fourth Dynasty of Egypt.

== Family ==
Iuenka was a son of Prince Khufukhaf I and Princess consort Nefertkau II. Thus he was a grandson of Pharaoh Khufu and Queen Henutsen. Iuenka's brother was Wetka and he also had one sister.

Prince Iuenka appears in his parents' double mastaba at Giza where he is depicted offering papyrus to his father. He also appears kneeling. His brother Wetka is also represented there.
