= Khamerernebty I =

Egyptian queen

- Queen consort of ancient Egypt
- Spouse: Pharaoh Khafre
- Issue: Pharaoh Menkaura; Queen Khamerernebty II
- Father: possibly Pharaoh Khufu

Khamerernebty I in hieroglyphs
G16 xa mr D21 D21
Khamerernebti
Ḫꜥ mrr nb.tj
Appearance of the beloved of the Two Ladies

Khamerernebty I was an ancient Egyptian queen of the 4th dynasty. She was probably a wife of King Khafre and the mother of King Menkaure and Queen Khamerernebty II. It is possible that she was a daughter of Khufu, based on the fact that inscriptions identify her as a King's daughter.

== Life ==
Khamerernebty I is identified with the king's mother whose partial name was found inscribed on a flint knife in the mortuary temple of Menkaure. She is thought to be the mother of Menkaure and was likely married to King Khafre. There are no inscriptions that explicitly mention her as a wife of Khafre however.

The Galarza tomb in Giza was originally probably built for Khamerernebty I, but was finished for her daughter Khamerernebty II. The inscriptions in this tomb are an important source of information about Khamerernebty I. The lintel above the entrance to the chapel included an inscription mentioning both Khamerernebty I and her daughter Khamerernebty II:

Mother of the King of Upper and Lower Egypt, Daughter of [the King of Upper and Lower Egypt, and Daughter of] the God, She who sees Horus and Seth, Great one of the hetes-sceptre, One great of praise, Priestess of Djehuty, Priestess of Tjasepef, the Greatly loved Wife of the King, King's Daughter of his body, revered mistress, honored by the Great God, Khamerernebty (I). Her eldest daughter, She who sees Horus and Seth, Great one of the hetes-sceptre, One great of praise, Priestess of Djehuty, Priestess of Tjazepef, One who sits with Horus, She who is united with the one beloved of the Two Ladies, Greatly loved Wife of the King, King's Daughter of his body, revered mistress, honored by her father, Khamerernebty (II). (Callender and Jánosi)

A priest named Nimaetre is mentioned in the Galarza tomb, and his tomb nearby refers to the queen-mother.

Baud suggests that an anonymous rock-cut tomb discovered by Selim Hassan south of the tomb of Rawer may have belonged to Queen Khamerernebty I. Callender and Janosi argue against this identification for a variety of reasons.

== Titles ==
Khamerernebty I's titles were: great of praises (weret-hezut, wrt-ḥzwt), great one of the hetes-sceptre (weret-hetes, wrt-ḥts), she who sees Horus and Seth (maat-hor-setekh, mꜣꜣt-ḥr-stẖ), mother of the dual king (mut-nesut-biti, mwt-nswt-bjtj), god's daughter (zat-netjer, zꜣt-nṯr), priestess of Thoth (hemet-netjer-djehuti, ḥmt-nṯr-ḏḥwtj), priestess of Tjazepef (hemet-netjer-tazepef, ḥmt-nṯr-tꜣzp.f), and king's wife, his beloved (hemet-nesut-meretef, ḥmt-nswt-mrt.f).
