= Khamerernebty II =

Egyptian queen

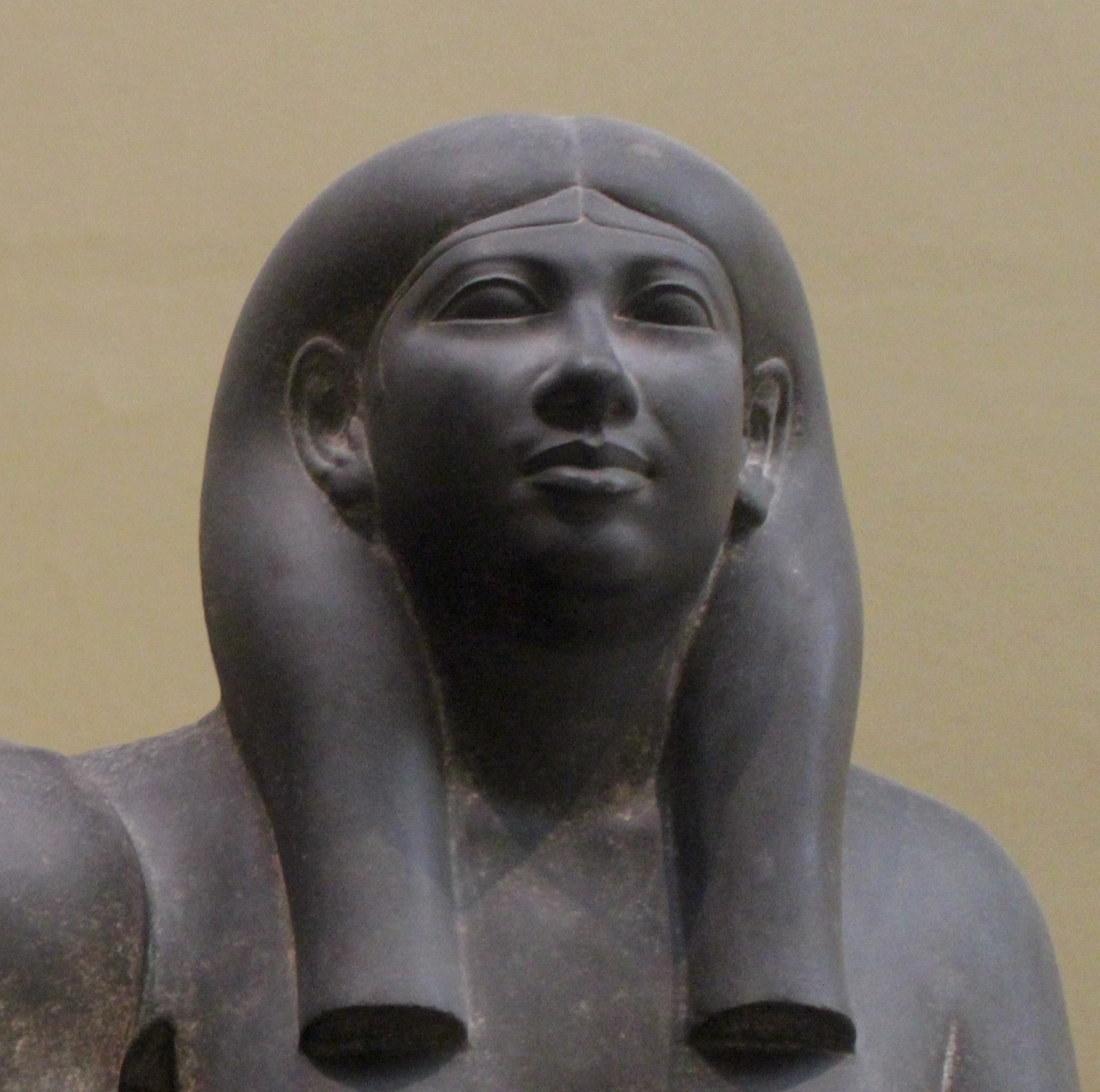
- Queen Khamerernebty II, statue in Boston
- Died: c. 2550 BC
- Spouse: Menkaure
- Issue: Khuenre
- Father: Khafre
- Mother: Khamerernebty I

Khamerernebty II in hieroglyphs
G16 xa mr D21 r
Khamerernebty

Khamerernebty II was an ancient Egyptian queen of the 4th Dynasty. She was a daughter of Pharaoh Khafre and Queen Khamerernebty I. She married her brother Menkaure and she was the mother of Prince Khuenre.

== Family ==
Khamerernebty II is said to be the daughter of Khamerernebty I in her tomb. Khamerernebty I is thought to be the mother of Menkaure based on a partial inscription on a flint knife in the mortuary temple of Menkaure and hence a wife of King Khafre. This would imply that Khamerernebty II was the daughter of King Khafre and Khamerernebty I.

Khamerernebty II was the mother of the King's Son Khuenre, who is thought to be the son of Menkaure. This suggests that Khamerernebty II must have married her brother Menkaure.

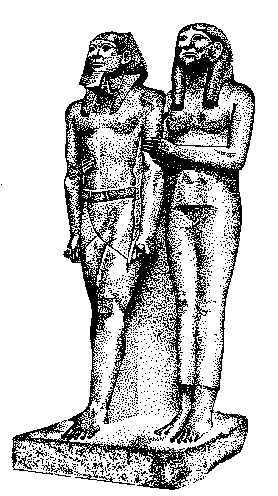
Statue of Egyptian Pharaoh Mycerinus (Menkure) and Khamerernebty II

== Burial ==
Khamerernebty II is mentioned in texts and on a statue found in the Galarza tomb in Giza. This tomb is located in the Central Field which is part of the Giza Necropolis. The tomb may have originally been built for Khamerernebty I, but was finished for her daughter Khamerernebty II after going through several changes. The lintel above the entrance to the chapel included an inscription mentioning both Khamerernebty I and her daughter Khamerernebty II:

Mother of the King of Upper and Lower Egypt, Daughter of [the King of Upper and Lower Egypt, and Daughter of] the God, She who sees Horus and Seth, Great one of the hetes-sceptre, One great of praise, Priestess of Djehuty, Priestess of Tjasepef, the Greatly loved Wife of the King, King's Daughter of his body, revered mistress, honored by the Great God, Khamerernebty (I). Her eldest daughter, She who sees Horus and Seth, Great one of the hetes-sceptre, One great of praise, Priestess of Djehuty, Priestess of Tjazepef, One who sits with Horus, She who is united with the one beloved of the Two Ladies, Greatly loved Wife of the King, King's Daughter of his body, revered mistress, honored by her father, Khamerernebty (II). (Callender and Jánosi)

The inscriptions of the title of Khamerernebty II were also made to imitate the inscriptions of Khamerernebty I and vice versa.

It is possible that she was buried in either Pyramid G3a or G3b (auxiliary pyramids to the Pyramid of Menkaure) instead.

A later addition was made to the tomb for the burial of the King's Son Sekhemre. It has been suggested that he was either a son or grandson of Khamerernebty II. It is also possible however that his burial dates to a later period and is intrusive.
