= Hu, Egypt =

Huw هُو Hu
- Town
- Location in Egypt
- Coordinates: 26°1′N 32°17′E
- Country: Egypt
- Governorate: Qena
- Markaz: Nag Hammadi
- Time zone: UTC+2 (EET)
  - Summer (DST): UTC+3 (EEST)

Hu, Huw or Hiw (Arabic: هُو, Coptic: ϩⲱ, ϩⲟⲩ) is the modern name of an Egyptian town on the Nile, which in more ancient times was the capital of the 7th Nome of Upper Egypt.

The nome was referred to as Sesheshet (Sistrum). The main city was referred to as Hu(t)-sekhem (Ancient Egyptian: Ḥw.t-Sḫm), which became abbreviated as Hu. This led to the Arabic name Huw.

In Ptolemaic times the city was called Diospolis Mikra (Ancient Greek: Διὸς πόλις Μικρά, lit. 'lesser city of Zeus'; Latin: Diospolis Parva) in comparison with Thebes, Egypt, known as Diospolis Megale, "greater city of Zeus". It also was called Diospolis Superior (Upper Zeus-City), in comparison with Diospolis Inferior (Lower Zeus-City) in the Nile Delta.

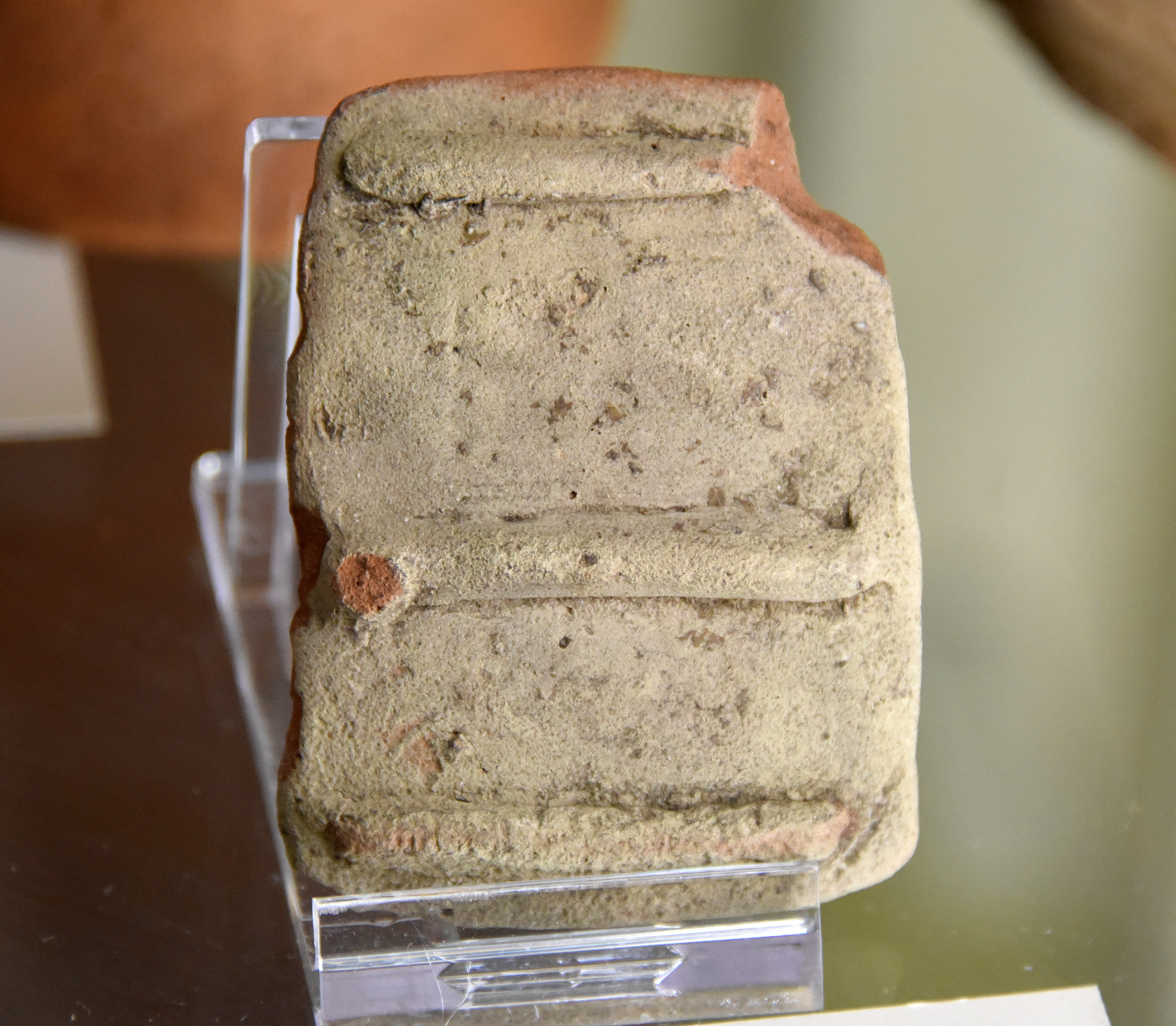
Fragment of pottery used as a lamp, thought to be from the Second Intermediate Period cemetery W at Diospolis Parva (Huw), Egypt - The Petrie Museum of Egyptian Archaeology, London

== Ancient history ==
Huw was the centre of the cult surrounding Bat, a goddess in Egyptian mythology. The sistrum, a sacred instrument associated with her, often shaped to resemble her, and for which the 7th nome was named, remained sacred throughout the history of Ancient Egypt and is seen in its art and hieroglyphs.

Hwt t pr z S m sxm Z2 pr niwt
ḥt sšmw
in hieroglyphs

The goddess Bat remained the main deity worshiped there until at least the time of the twelfth dynasty as she is mentioned on a shrine belonging to Senusret I. By the time of the New Kingdom during the eighteenth dynasty, the characteristics of Bat were subsumed into those of a similar goddess, Hathor, who then became the main deity worshiped at Huw. Previously they may have been the same deity.

== Modern history ==
In 1326, Ibn Battuta passed through Huw, where he visited a sharif named Abu Muhammad Abdallah al-Hasani. When he learned of Ibn Battuta's intention to go on the hajj to Mecca by way of Aydhab, the sharif predicted that he would not succeed and would only reach Mecca by way of the road through Syria; he told Ibn Battuta to return to Cairo instead. Ibn Battuta went on to Aydhab anyway, but upon arriving, he found that local Beja tribespeople, in revolt against the Mamluk governor, had driven out the town's garrison and sunk ships in the harbor, preventing anyone from setting sail to Hejaz. Ibn Battuta was left with no choice but to return to Cairo.

The 1885 Census of Egypt recorded Huw as a nahiyah under the district of Dishna in Qena Governorate; at that time, the population of the town was 3,958 (2,011 men and 1,947 women).

== See also ==
- List of ancient Egyptian towns and cities
