= Wetka =

Egyptian high official

- Prince of Egypt
- Father: Prince Khufukhaf I
- Mother: Princess Nefertkau II

Wetka was an ancient Egyptian high official, bearing the honorary title of "king's son". He is also called Tuka or Tuwka. He lived in the Fourth Dynasty of Egypt.

== Family ==
Wetka was a son of Prince Khufukhaf I and Princess consort Nefertkau II. Thus he was a grandson of Pharaoh Khufu and Queen Henutsen. Wetka's brother was Iuenka and he also had one sister.

Prince Wetka appears in his parents' double mastaba at Giza where he is depicted offering papyrus to his father. He also appears kneeling.
