= Khufukhaf I =

Egyptian prince and vizier

- Prince of Egypt; Vizier of Egypt
Egyptian name
< Aa1 G43 I9 G43 > N28 I9 Khufukhaf
(Kha ef Khufu)
Ḫʿj-f-Ḫwfw
He appears like Khufu
- Dynasty: 4th Dynasty
- Pharaoh: Khufu or Khafre
- Burial: G 7130-7140, Giza
- Spouse: Nefertkau II
- Father: Khufu

Khufukhaf I (also read as Khaefkhufu I) was an ancient Egyptian prince and vizier of the 4th Dynasty.

== Family ==
Khufukhaf was a son of pharaoh Khufu, half-brother of pharaoh Djedefre and full brother of pharaoh Khafre and prince Minkhaf. His mother might have been Queen Henutsen; the latter's pyramid is next to his mastaba tomb. His wife was named Nefertkau II and she was buried with him in Giza.

== Life ==
He served as vizier, possibly towards the end of Khufu's reign or during his brother Khafre's reign.

== Tomb ==
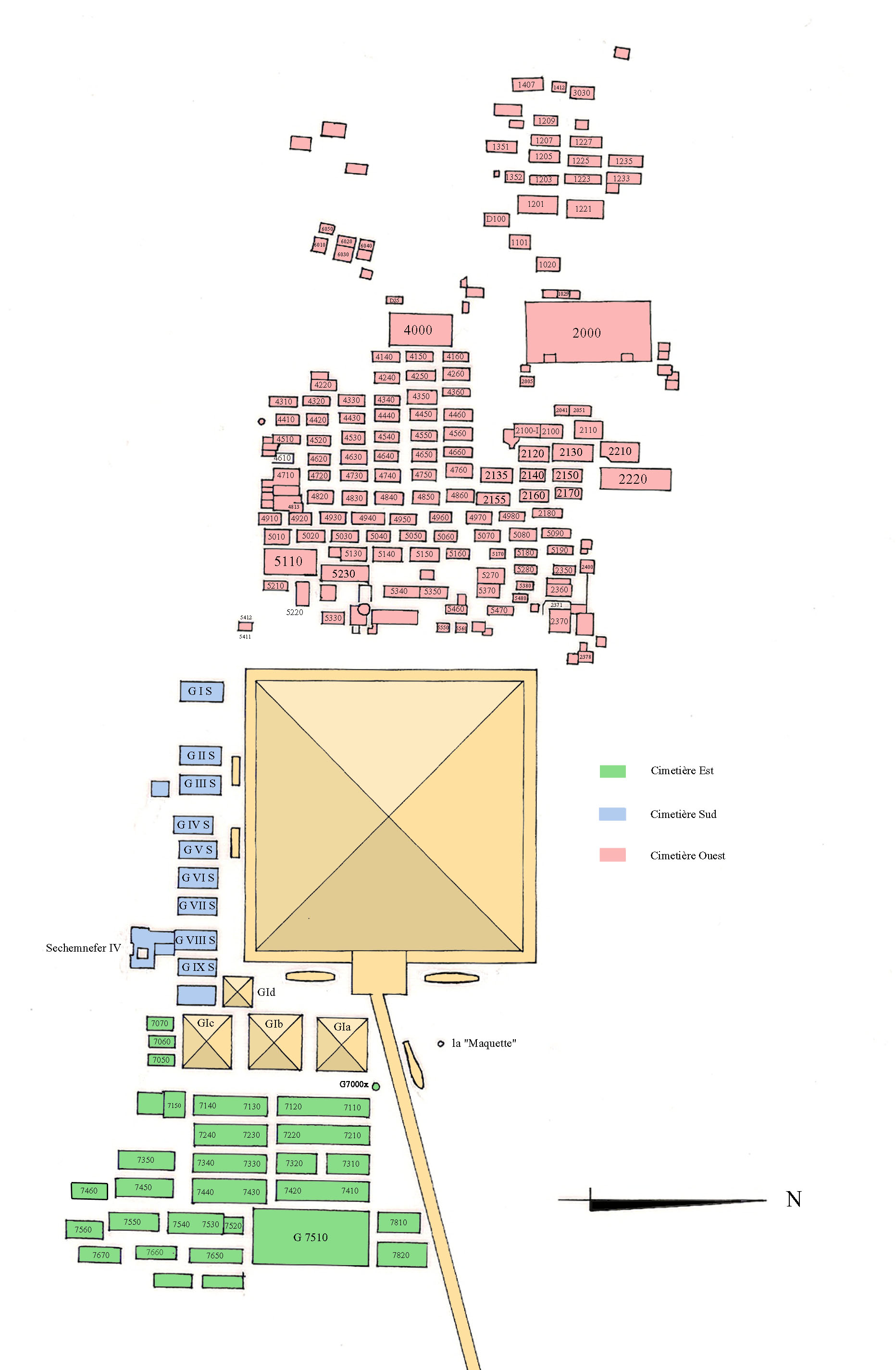
Tomb of Khufukhaf is located near the east side(depicted in green) compared to the Great Pyramid of Giza as shown in the centre of the picture.

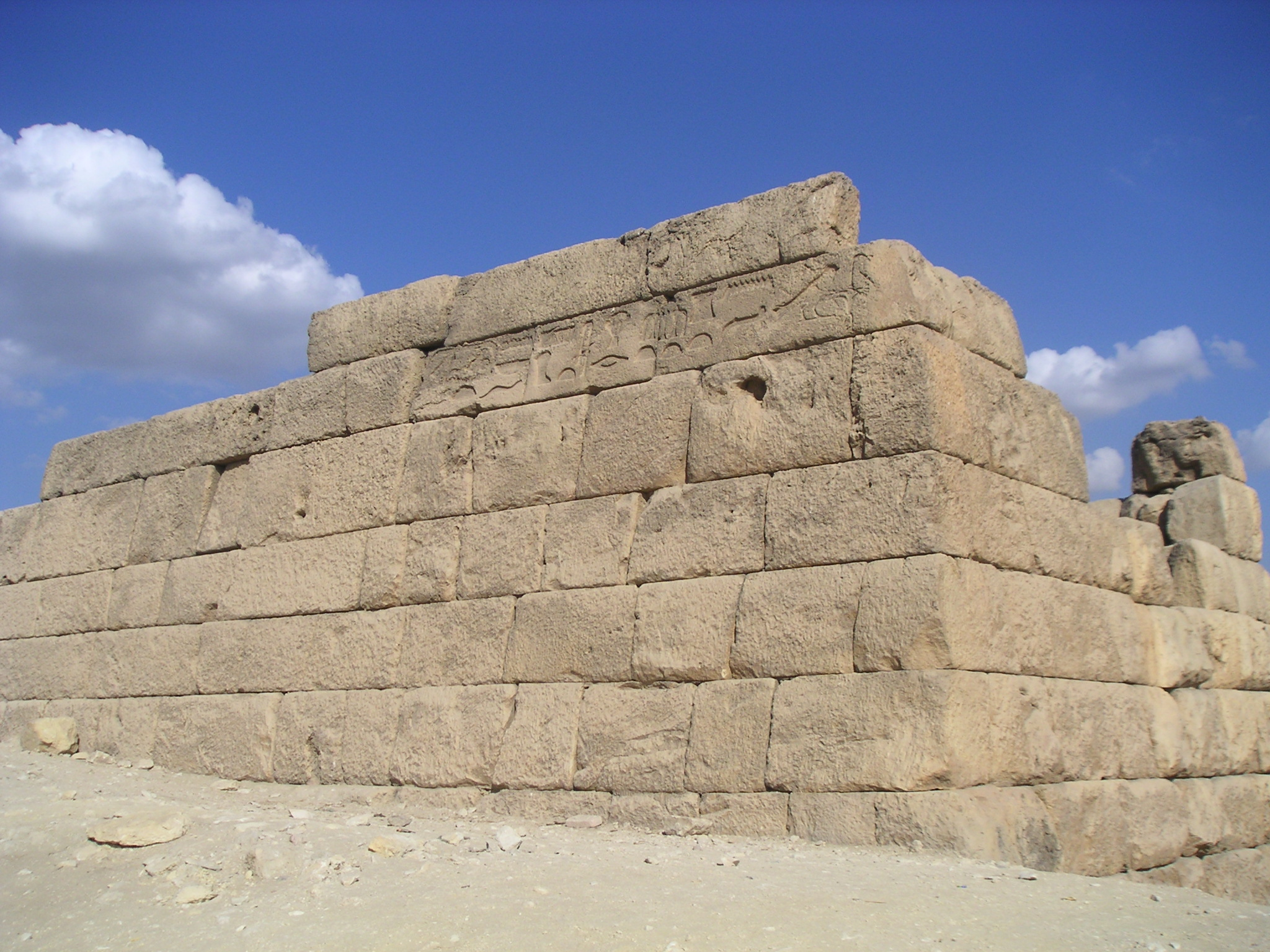
Mastaba of Khufukhaf I

Khufukhaf had a double mastaba in Giza (tomb G 7130-7140) in the east field which is part of the Giza Necropolis. Mastaba G 7130 is attributed to Khufukhaf's wife Nefertkau. G 7140 belonged to Khufukhaf himself. Khufukhaf is depicted with Queen Henutsen in the Hall of the Mastaba. Several sons are mentioned as well. A son named Wetka (also called Tuka) is depicted in the chapel of the mastaba. Another son named Iuenka (or Iun-ka) is depicted in the chapel as well. Iunka is given the title of King's Son in the tomb. Khufukhaf also had a daughter.

== Titles ==
Khufukhaf was part of the highest level of the administration and was elevated to the vizierate probably during the reign of Khafre, his brother. This rank, the highest at the time, was strictly reserved to the close family of the Pharaoh during the 4th dynasty.

Main titles:

Title	Translation	Jones Index
iry-pˁt	hereditary prince/nobleman, 'keeper of the patricians'	1157
ˁḏ-mr dp	administrator\boundary official of Dep (Buto)	1348
wḏ-mdw n ḥry(w)-wḏb(w)	giver of orders to those in charge of reversions (offerings)	1500
mdw ḥp	herdsman of Apis	1699
ḥm Bȝw Nḫn	servant of the Souls of Nekhen/Hierakonpolis	1877
ḥm-nṯr ḥr ḳȝ-ˁ	priest of Horus elevated-of-arm	2075
ḥm-nṯr ḫwfw	priest of Khufu	2087
ḥrỉ-wḏb m ḥwt-ˁnḫ	master of the largess/he who is in charge of reversions (of offerings) in the House/ Mansion of Life	2215
ḫrp ˁḥ	director of the ˁḥ palace	2579
zȝ nswt	king's son	2911
zȝ nswt n ẖt.f	King's son of his body	2912
smr wˁty	sole companion	3268
tȝyty zȝb ṯȝty	he of the curtain, chief justice, vizier	3706
wr di.w pr ḏḥwty	Greatest of the Five in the temple of Thoth	1471

Translation and indexes from Dilwyn Jones.
