= Menkaure =

Egyptian pharaoh of the 4th dynasty

- Menkaura, Mykerinos, Menkheres
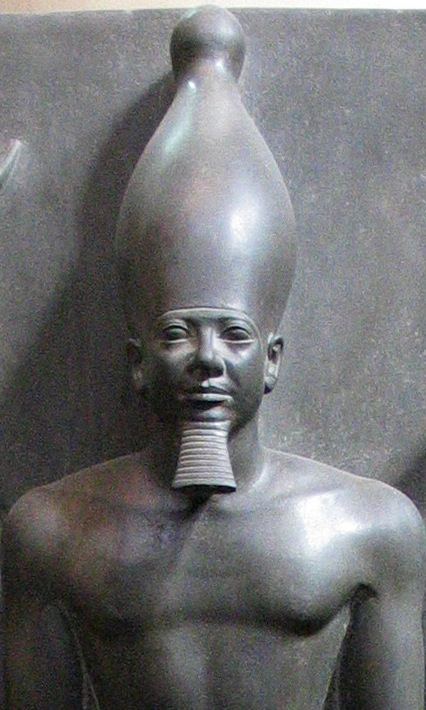
- Greywacke statue of Menkaure; Egyptian Museum, Cairo

Pharaoh
- Reign: Around 29 years, c. 2532 – c. 2503 BC
- Predecessor: Khafre (most likely) or Bikheris
- Successor: Shepseskaf
Royal titulary
Horus name
Hor-Kakhet
ῌr-k3-ḫt
Horus, Bull of the divine company
G5	D28 E1 F32
Nebty name
Ka-Nebty
Nbt.j-k3
Bull of the two Ladies
G16	D28 E1
Golden Horus
Netjer-bik-nebu
Nṯr-bjk-nb.w
The divine golden falcon
R8 G7 S12
Prenomen
Menkaura
mn-kꜣw-rꜥ
His ka-souls will stay like Ra
< N5 Y5 D28 D28 D28 >
Alternative spellings:
mn-kꜣw-rꜥ
< N5 Y5 D32 D32 D32 >
mn-kꜣ(w)-rꜥ
< N5 Y5 D28 >
< N5 Y5 D32 >
Other variations:
Abydos King List
Menkaure
mn-kꜣ.w-rꜥ
His Ka-souls will stay like Ra
< N5 Y5 n D28 Z2 >
Saqqara Tablet
...kaure
...kꜣ.w-rꜥ
< N5 HASH HASH D28 D28 >
- Consort: Possibly Khamerernebty II
- Children: Possibly Khuenre, Shepseskaf, and Khentkaus I
- Father: Khafre
- Mother: Possibly Khamerernebty I
- Born: c. 2550 BC
- Died: c. 2503 BC (aged c. 47)
- Burial: Pyramid of Menkaure
- Dynasty: 4th Dynasty

Menkaure or Menkaura (Egyptian transliteration: mn-kꜣw-rꜥ; c. 2550 BC - c. 2503 BC) was a king of the Fourth Dynasty of Egypt during the Old Kingdom. He is well known under his Hellenized names Mykerinos (Ancient Greek: Μυκερῖνος, romanized: Mukerînos by Herodotus), in turn Latinized as Mycerinus, and Menkheres (Μεγχέρης, Menkhérēs by Manetho). According to Manetho, he was the throne successor of king Bikheris, but according to archaeological evidence, he was almost certainly the successor of Khafre. Africanus (from Syncellus) reports as rulers of the fourth dynasty Sôris, Suphis I, Suphis II, Mencherês (=Menkaure), Ratoisês, Bicheris, Sebercherês, and Thamphthis in this order. Menkaure became famous for his tomb, the Pyramid of Menkaure, at Giza and his statue triads, which showed him alongside the goddess Hathor and various regional deities.

== Family ==
Menkaure was the son of Khafre and the grandson of Khufu. A flint knife found in the mortuary temple of Menkaure mentioned a king's mother Khamerernebty I, suggesting that Khafre and this queen were the parents of Menkaure. Menkaure is thought to have had at least two wives.

=== Possible son with Khamerernebty II ===
Queen Khamerernebty II is the daughter of Khamerernebty I and the mother of a king's son Khuenre. The location of Khuenre's tomb suggests that he was a son of Menkaure, making his mother the wife of this king.

- Khuenre: Menkaure was not succeeded by Prince Khuenre, likely his eldest son, who predeceased Menkaure, but rather by Shepseskaf, a younger son of this king.

Queen Rekhetre is known to have been a daughter of Khafre and as such the most likely identity of her husband is Menkaure.

=== Possible children with unknown spouse(s) ===
Its possible that Menkaure had other children, but no mothers have been identified.

- Shepseskaf (died c. 2498 BC): The successor to Menkaure and likely his son.
- Sekhemre: Known from a statue and possibly a son of Menkaure.
- A daughter who died in early adulthood is mentioned by Herodotus. She was placed at a decorated hall of the palatial area at Sais, in a hollow gold layered wooden zoomorphic burial feature in the shape of a kneeling cow covered externally with a layer of red decoration except the neck area and the horns that were covered with adequate layers of gold.
- Khentkaus I: possible daughter of Menkaure

The royal court included several of Menkaure's half brothers. His brothers Nebemakhet, Duaenre, Nikaure, and Iunmin served as viziers during the reign of their brother. His brother Sekhemkare may have been younger than he was and became vizier after the death of Menkaure.

== Reign ==
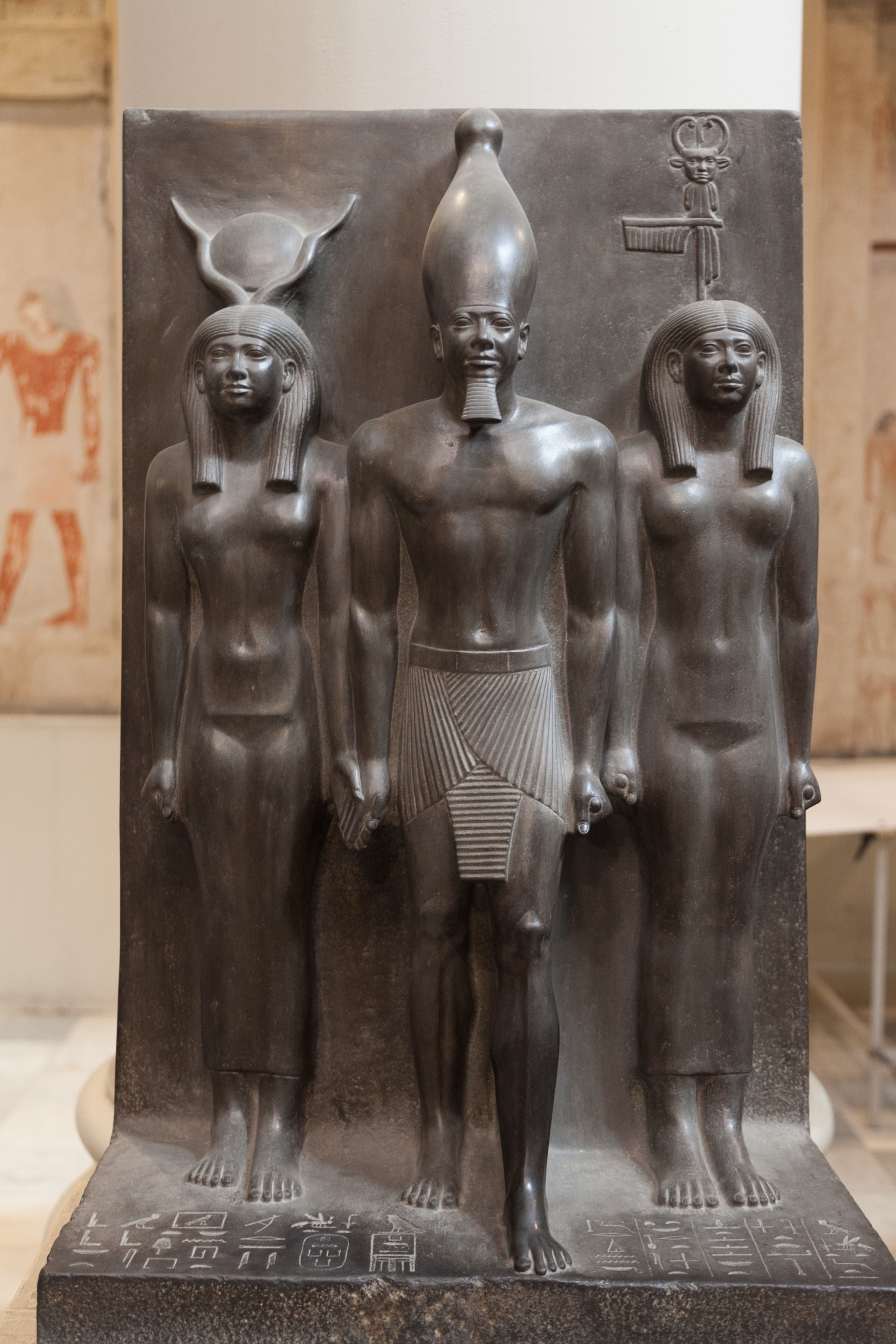
Menkaura flanked by the goddess Hathor (left) and the personification of the nome of Seshesh (right). Graywacke statue in Cairo Museum.

The length of Menkaure's reign is uncertain. The ancient historian Manetho credits him with a reign of 63 years, but this is surely an exaggeration. The Turin King List is damaged at the spot where it should present the full sum of years, but the remains allow a reconstruction of "..?.. + 8 years of rulership". Egyptologists think that 18-year reign was meant to be written, which is generally accepted. A contemporary workmen's graffito reports about the "year after the 11th cattle count". If the cattle count was held every second year (as was tradition at least up to king Sneferu), Menkaure might have ruled for 22 years.

In 2013, a fragment of the sphinx of Menkaure was discovered at Tel Hazor at the entrance to the city palace.

== Pyramid complex ==
Menkaure's pyramid at Giza was called Netjer-er-Menkaure, meaning "Menkaure is Divine". This pyramid is the smallest of the three main pyramids at Giza. This pyramid measures 103.4 m (339 ft) at the base and 65.5 m (215 ft) in height. There are three subsidiary pyramids associated with Menkaure's pyramid.

These other pyramids are sometimes labeled G-IIIa (East subsidiary pyramid), G-IIIb (Middle subsidiary pyramid) and G-IIIc (West subsidiary pyramid). In the chapel associated with G-IIIa a statue of a queen was found. It is possible that these pyramids were meant for the queens of Khafre. It may be that Khamerernebti II was buried in one of the pyramids.

=== Valley temple ===
The Valley temple was a mainly brick built structure that was enlarged in the fifth or sixth Dynasty. From this temple come the famous statues of Menkaure with his queen and Menkaure with several deities ("Menkaure triads"). A partial list includes:

- Nome triad, Hathor-Mistress-of-the-Sycomore seated, and King and Hare-nome goddess standing, greywacke, in Boston Mus. 09.200.
- Nome triad, King, Hathor-Mistress-of-the-Sycomore and Theban nome-god standing, greywacke. (Now in Cairo Mus. Ent. 40678.)
- Nome triad, King, Hathor-Mistress-of-the-Sycomore and Jackal-nome goddess standing, greywacke. (Now in Cairo Mus. Ent. 40679.)
- Nome triad, King, Hathor-Mistress-of-the-Sycomore and Bat-fetish nome -goddess standing, greywacke. (Now in Cairo Mus. Ent. 46499.)
- Nome triad, King, Hathor, and nome-god standing, greywacke. (Middle part in Boston Mus. 11.3147, head of King in Brussels, Mus. Roy. E. 3074.)
- Double-statue, King and wife (Khamerernebty II) standing, uninscribed, greywacke. (Now in Boston Mus. 11.1738.)
- King seated, life-size, fragmentary, alabaster. (Now in Cairo Mus. Ent. 40703.)
- King seated, lower part, inscribed seat, alabaster. (Now in Boston Mus. 09.202)

=== Mortuary Temple ===
At his mortuary temple more statues and statue fragments were found. An interesting find is a fragment of a wand from Queen Khamerernebty I. The piece is now in the Boston Museum of Fine Arts. Khamerernebty is given the title King's Mother on the fragment.

=== Sarcophagus ===
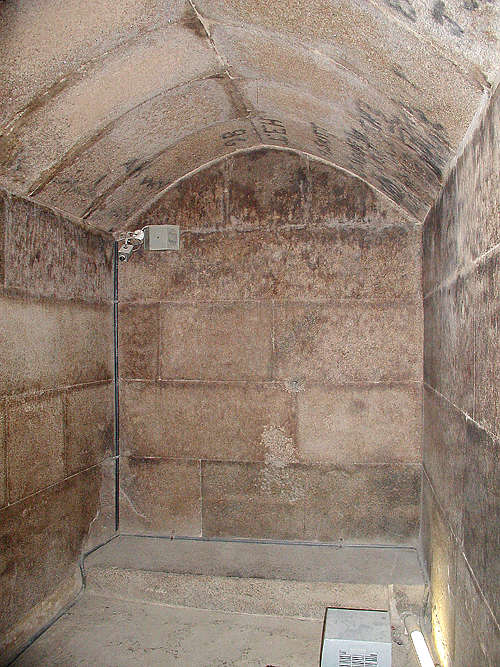
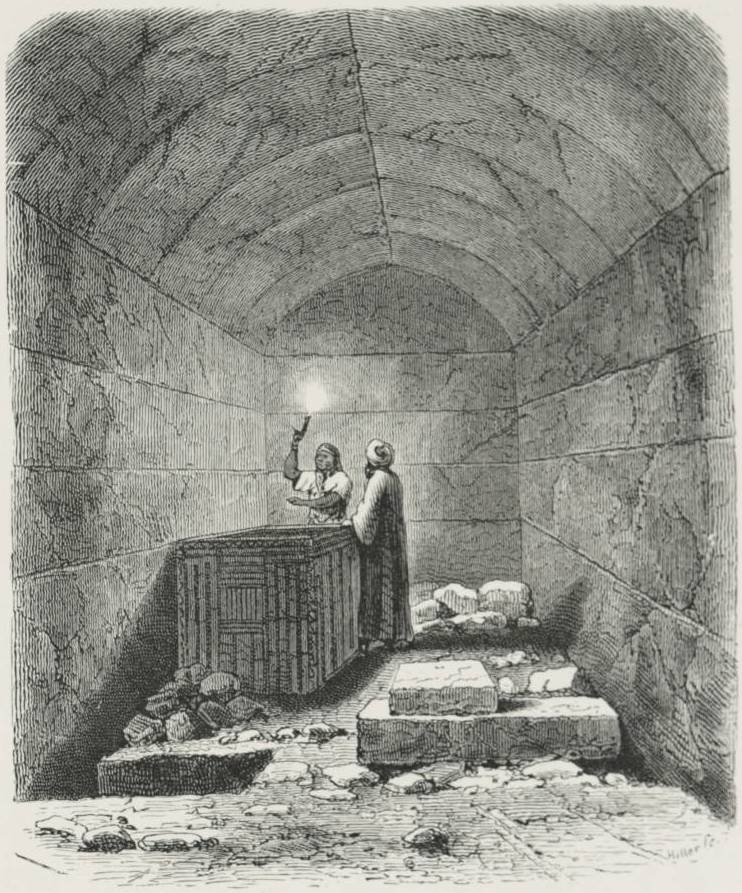
Burial chamber of Menkaure, today, and as discovered with now lost sarcophagus

In 1837, English army officer Richard William Howard Vyse, and engineer John Shae Perring began excavations within the pyramid of Menkaure. In the main burial chamber of the pyramid they found a large stone sarcophagus 8 feet 0 inches (244 cm) long, 3 feet 0 inches (91 cm) in width, and 2 feet 11 inches (89 cm) in height, made of basalt. The sarcophagus was not inscribed with hieroglyphs although it was decorated in the style of palace facade. Adjacent to the burial chamber were found wooden fragments of a coffin bearing the name of Menkaure and a partial skeleton wrapped in a coarse cloth. The sarcophagus was removed from the pyramid and was sent by ship to the British Museum in London, but the merchant ship Beatrice carrying it was lost after leaving port at Malta on October 13, 1838. The other materials were sent by a separate ship, and those materials now reside at the museum, with the remains of the wooden coffin case on display.

It is now thought that the coffin was a replacement made during the much later Saite period, nearly two millennia after the king's original interment. Radiocarbon dating of the bone fragments that were found, place them at an even later date, from the Coptic period in the first centuries AD.

== Records from later periods ==
According to Herodotus (430 BC), Menkaure was the son of Khufu (Greek Cheops), and he alleviated the suffering his father's reign had caused the inhabitants of ancient Egypt. Herodotus adds that he suffered much misfortune: his only daughter, whose corpse was interred in a wooden bull (which Herodotus claims survived to his lifetime), died before him. Subsequently the oracle at Buto predicted he would only rule six more years.

The king deemed this unjust, and sent back to the oracle a message of reproach, blaming the god: why must he die so soon who was pious, whereas his father and his uncle had lived long, who shut up the temples, and regarded not the gods, and destroyed men? But a second utterance from the place of divination declared to him that his good deeds were the very cause of shortening his life; for he had done what was contrary to fate; Egypt should have been afflicted for an hundred and fifty years, whereof the two kings before him had been aware, but not Mycerinus. Hearing this, he knew that his doom was fixed. Therefore he caused many lamps to be made, and would light these at nightfall and drink and make merry; by day or night he never ceased from revelling, roaming to the marsh country and the groves and wherever he heard of the likeliest places of pleasure. Thus he planned, that by turning night into day he might make his six years into twelve and so prove the oracle false.

== In popular culture ==
- Menkaure was the subject of a poem by the nineteenth century English poet Matthew Arnold, entitled "Mycerinus".
- Menkaure, using the Greek version of his name, Mencheres, is a major character in the Night Huntress series of books by Jeaniene Frost, depicted as an extremely old and powerful vampire living in modern times. He is a protagonist of one book in the series.

== Gallery ==
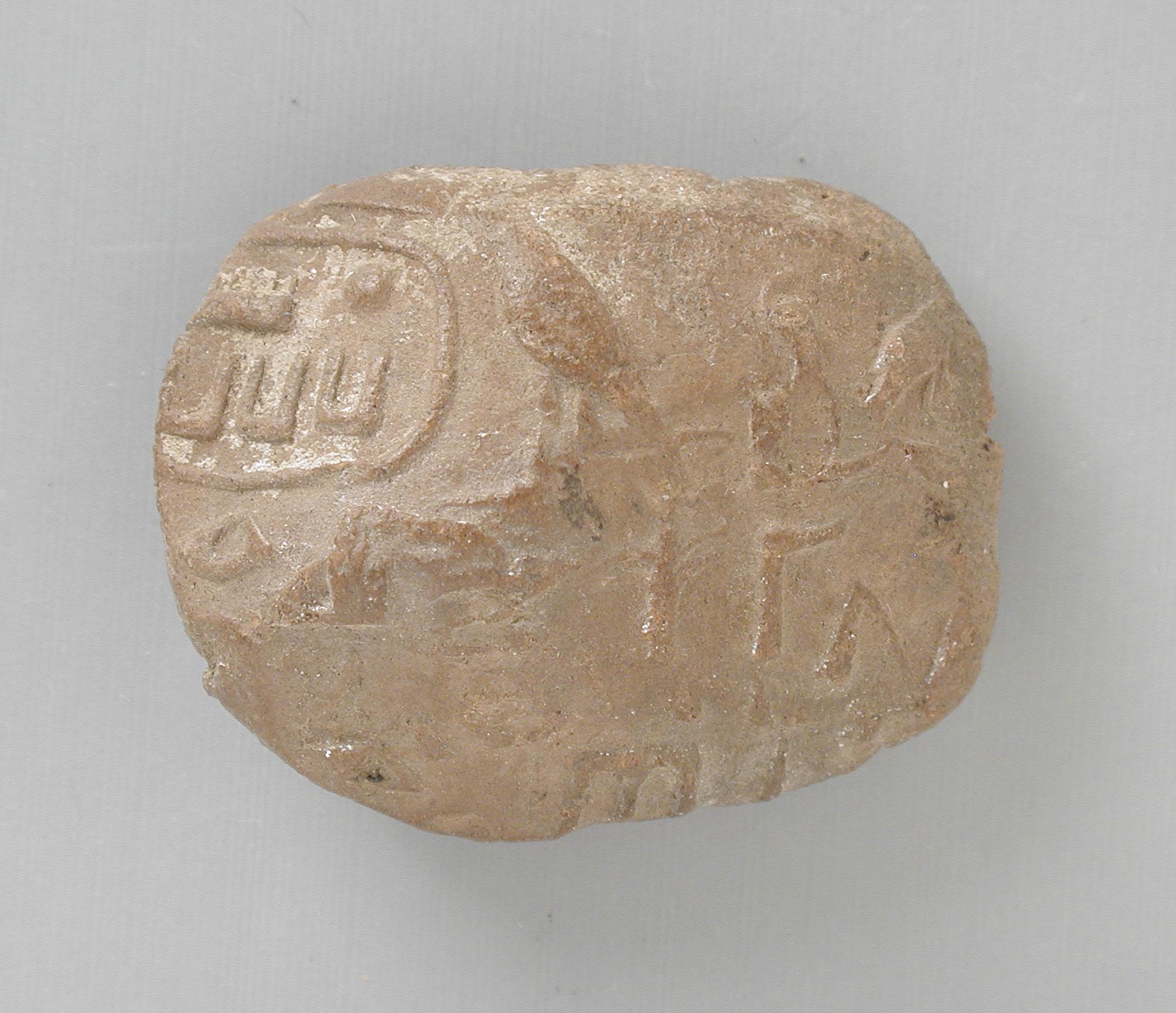
Seal Impression with Name of King Menkaure LACMA M.80.202.837

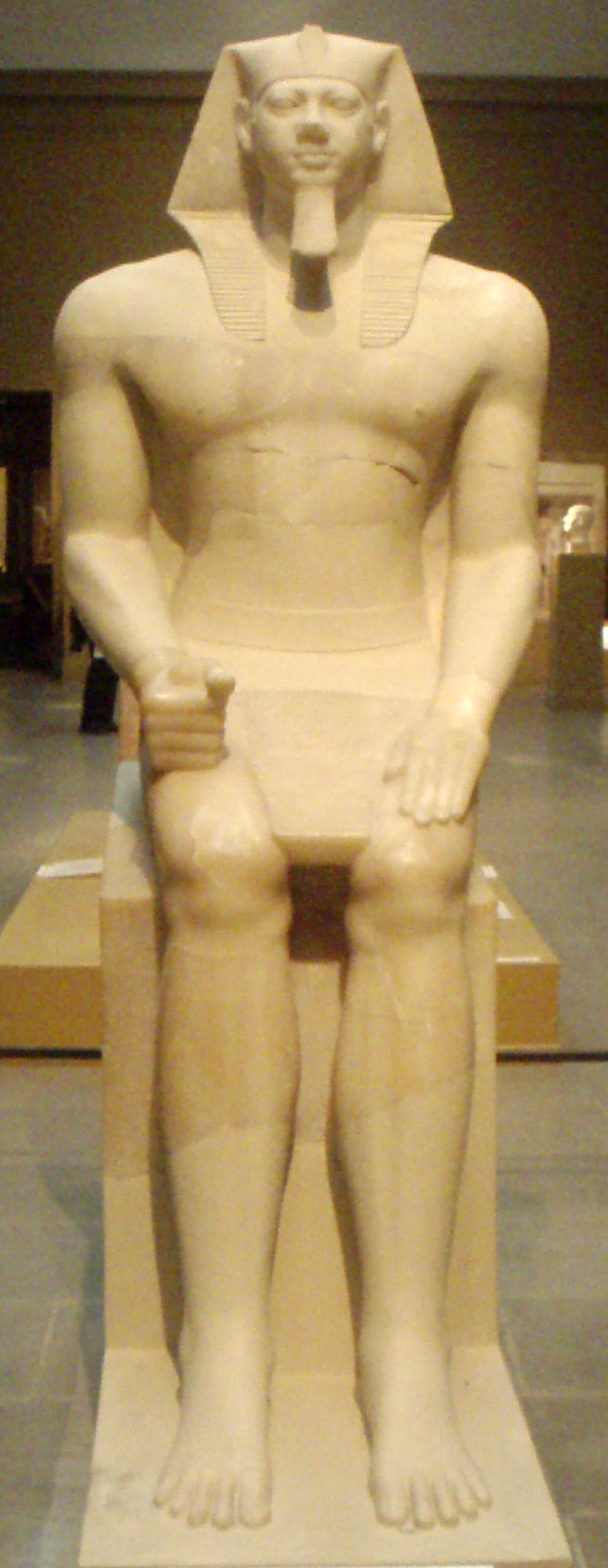
Colossal alabaster statue of Menkaure at the Boston Museum of Fine Arts (possibly a usurped statue of Khafre)

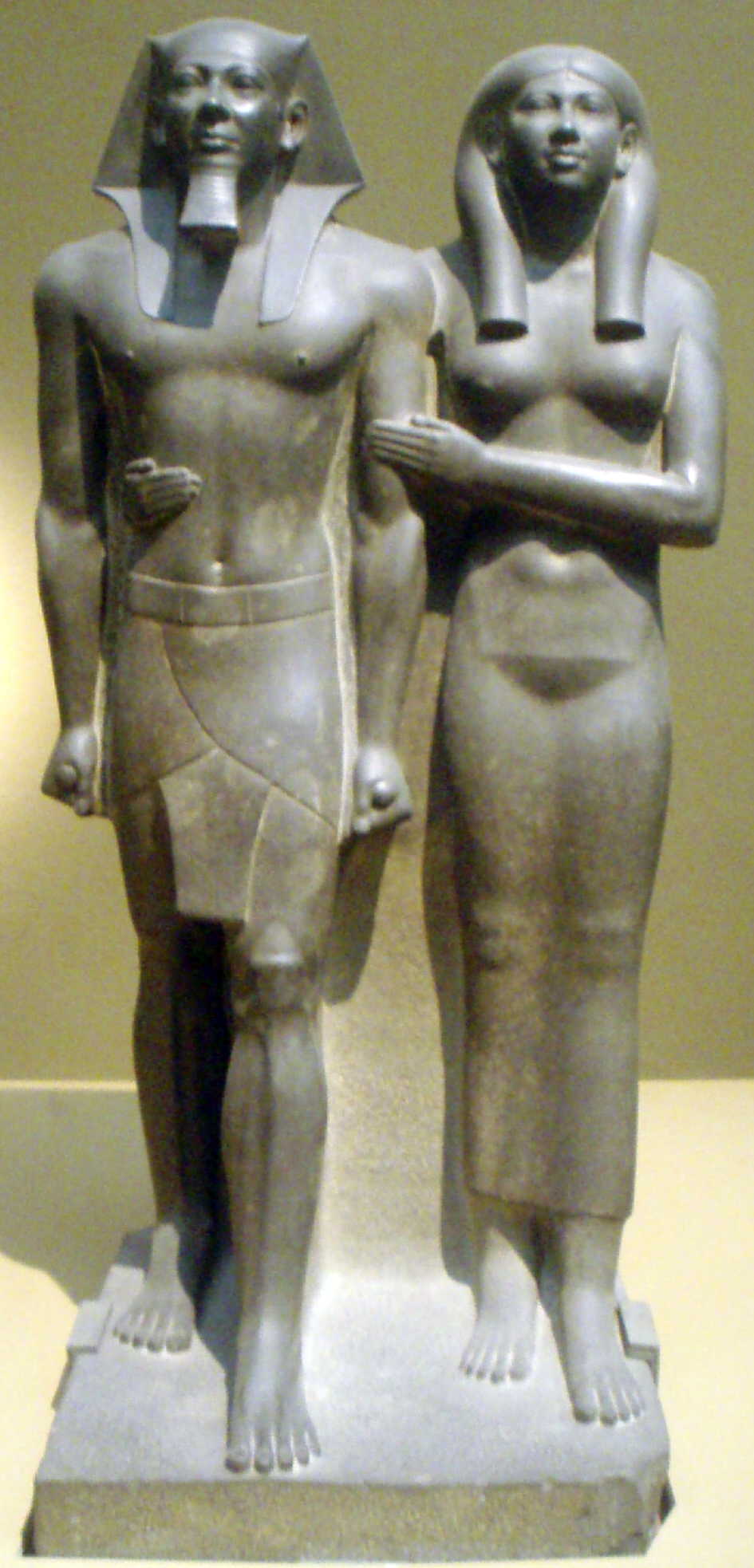
Greywacke statue of Menkaure and Queen Khamerernebty II at the Boston Museum of Fine Arts.

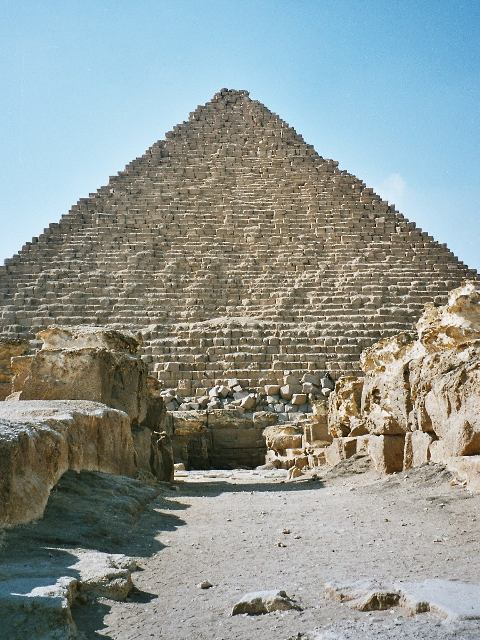
Menkaure's Pyramid in Giza.

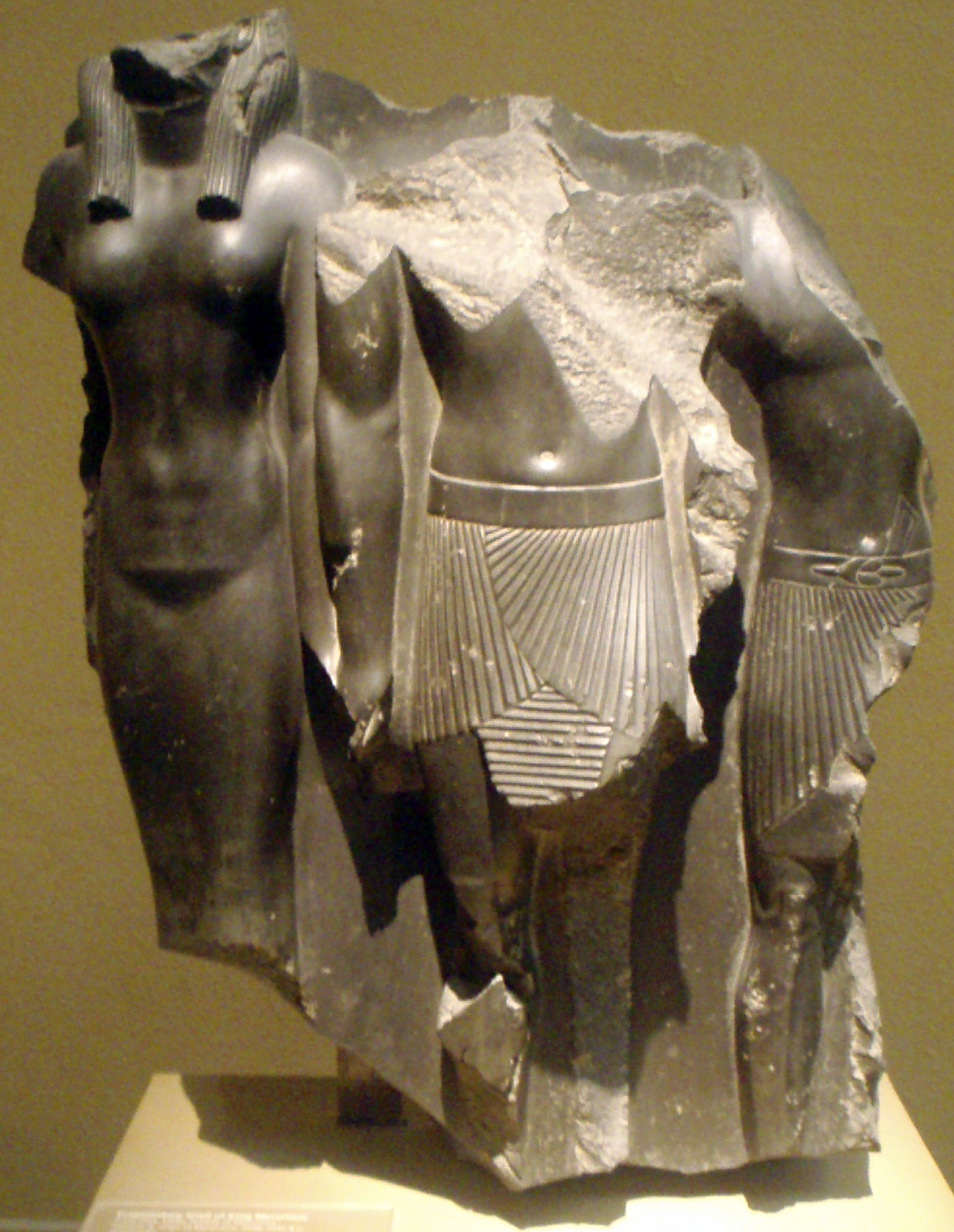
Fragmentary statue triad of Menkaure flanked by the goddess Hathor (left) and a male nome god (right), Boston Museum of Fine Arts.

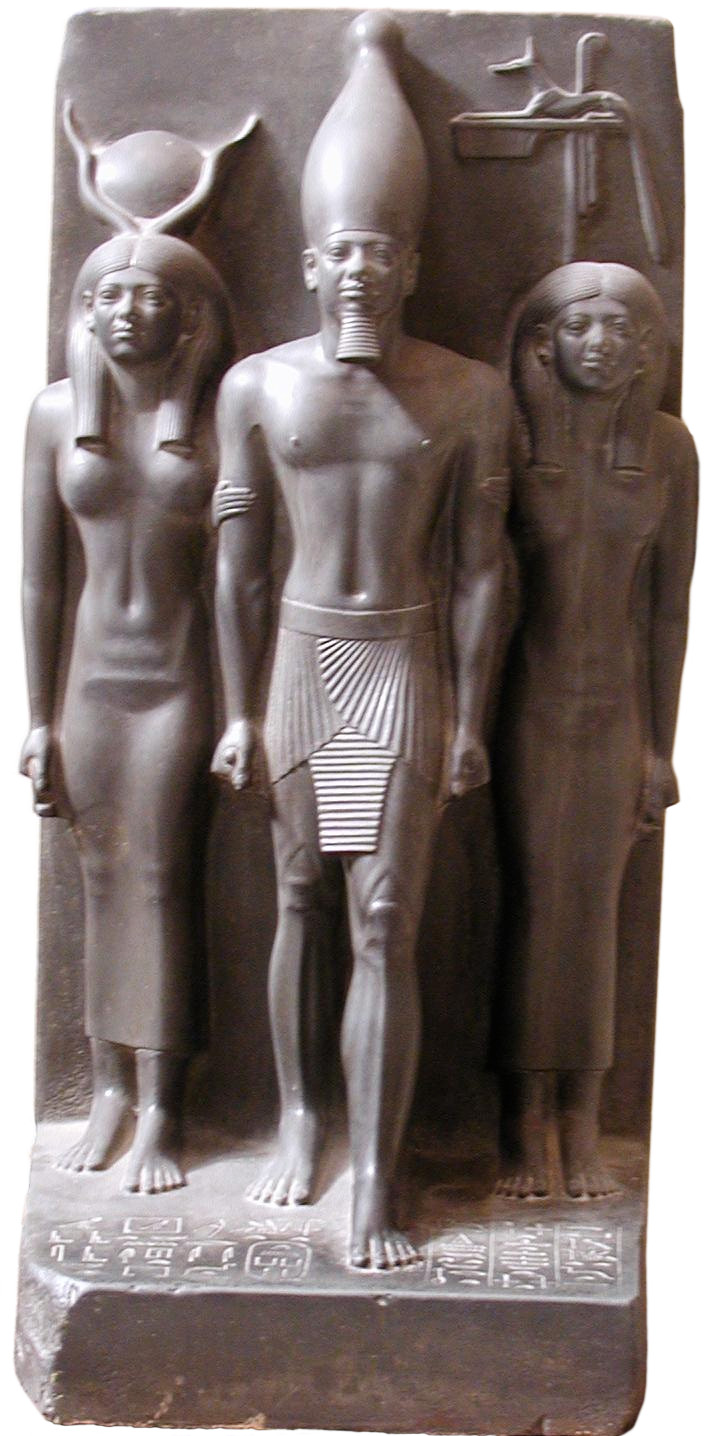
Menkaure alongside Hathor and the nome goddess Anput

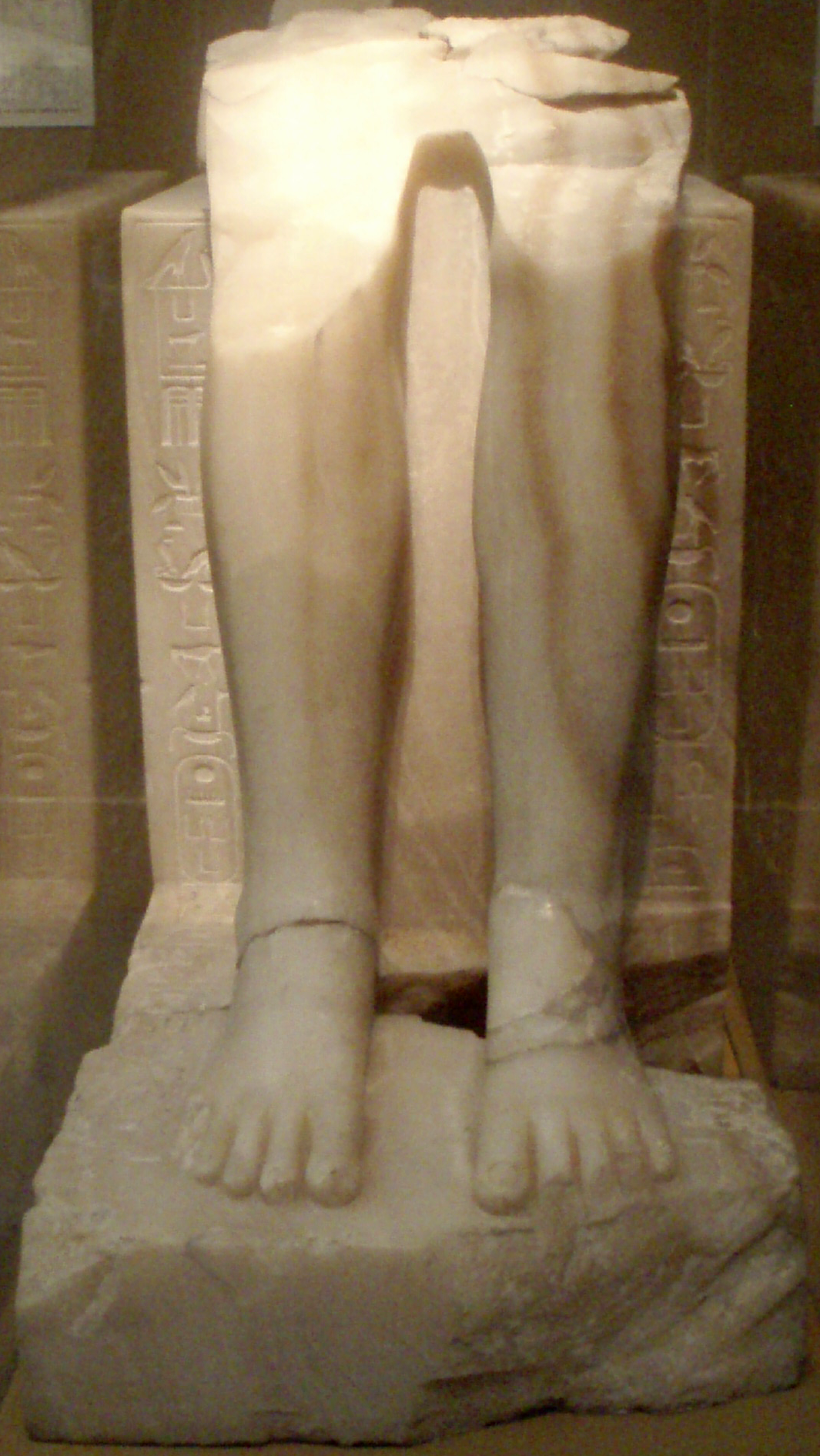
Fragmentary alabaster statue of Menkaure at the Boston Museum of Fine Arts.

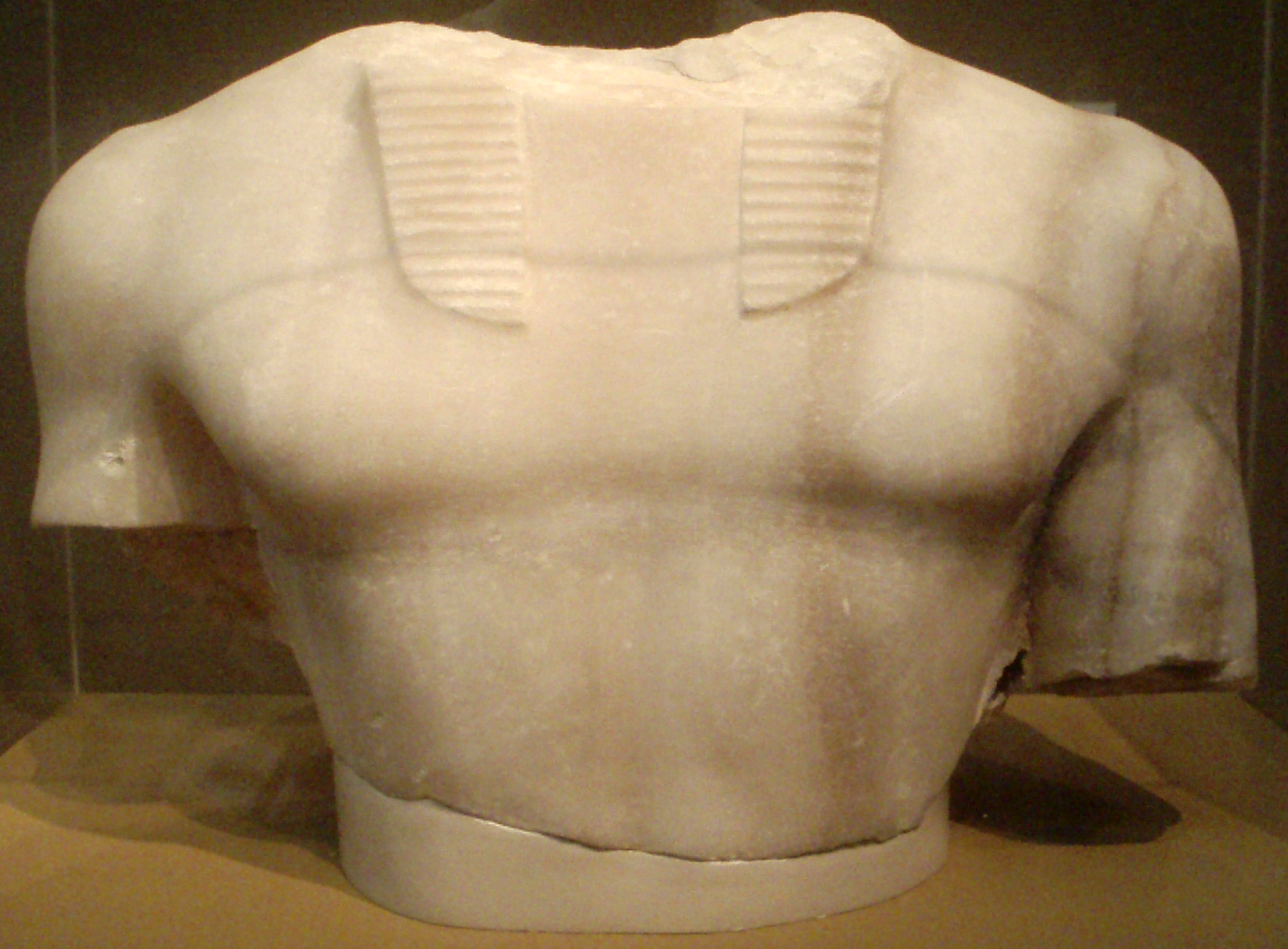
Fragmentary alabaster statue of Menkaure at the Boston Museum of Fine Arts.

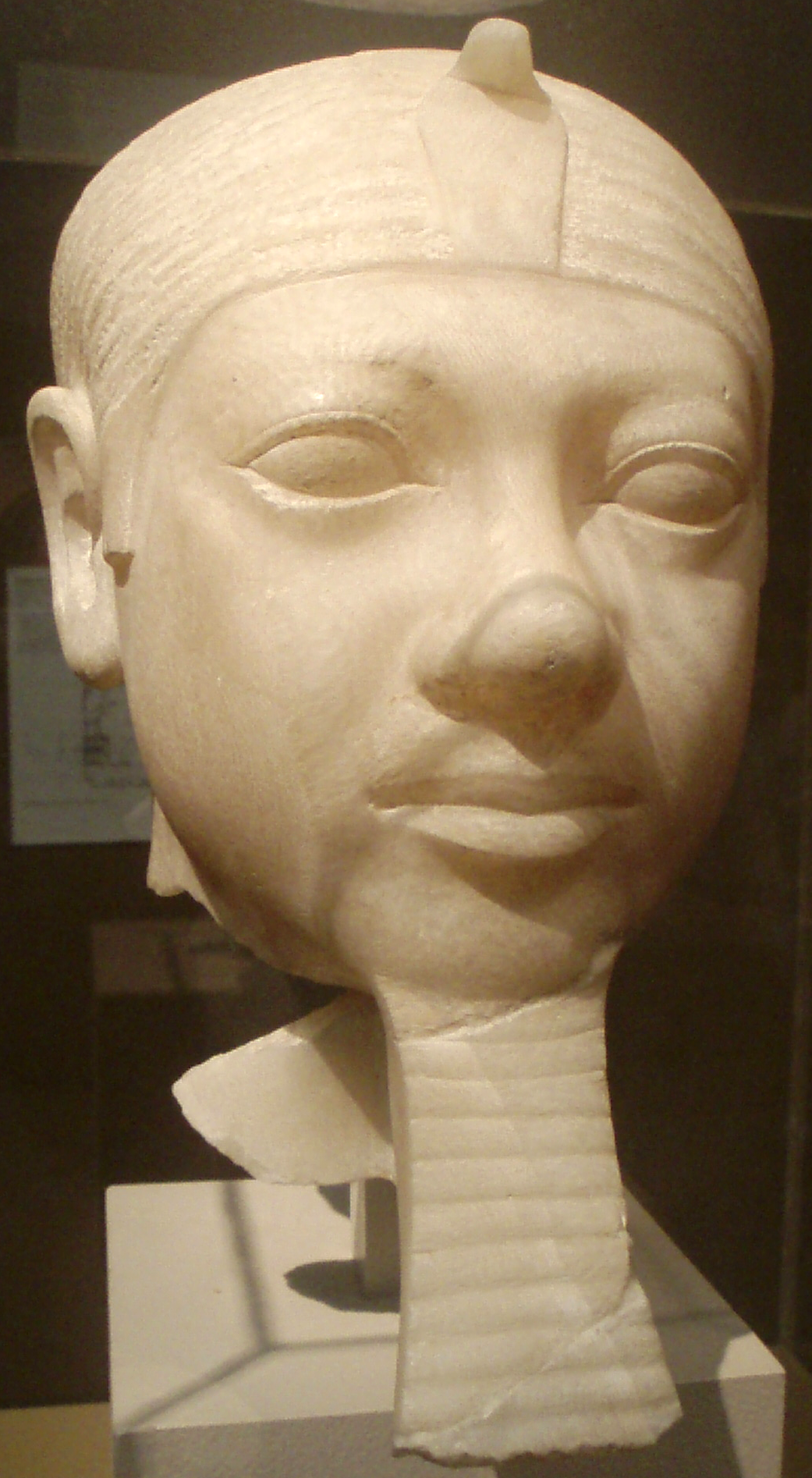
Fragmentary alabaster statue head of believed to depict either Menkaure or Shepseskaf at the Boston Museum of Fine Arts.

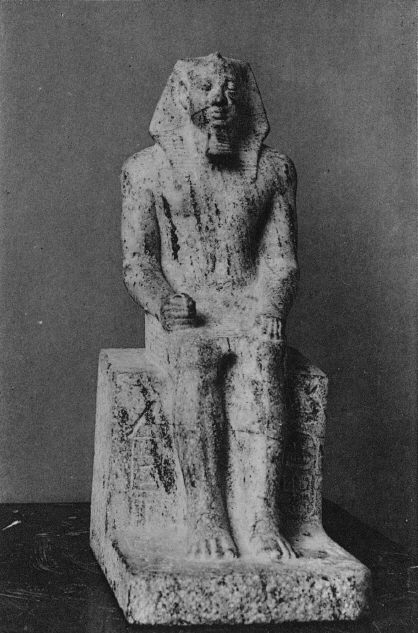
Statuette of Menkaure of uncertain provenance, now in the Egyptian Museum

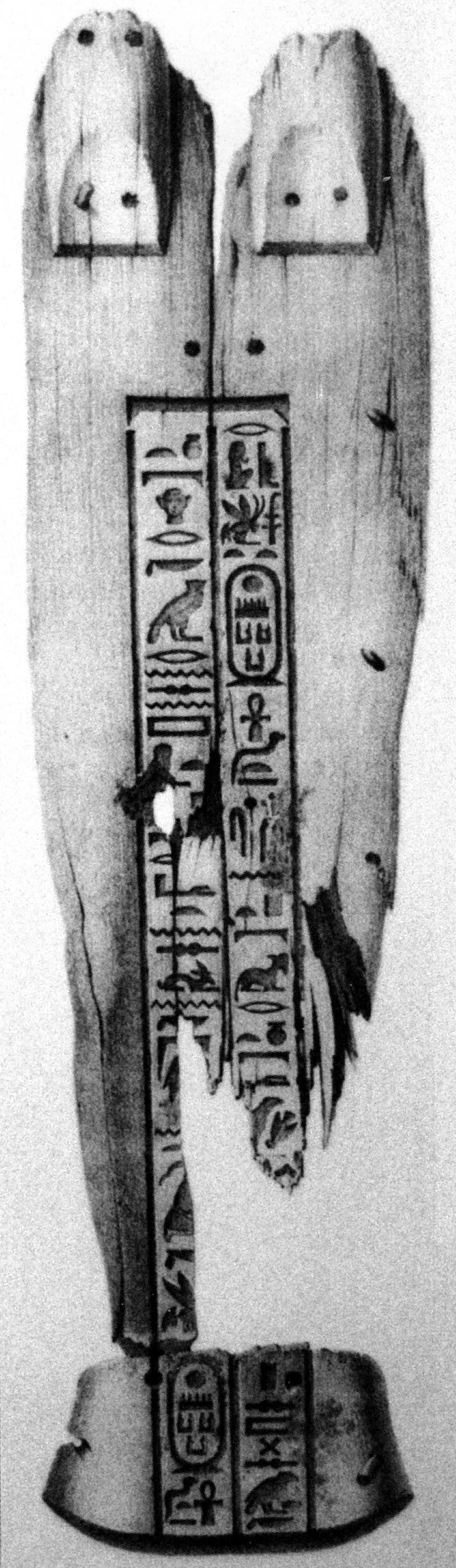
Drawing of the anthropoid coffin fragment inscribed with the name of the king Menkaure made by excavator Richard Vyse and published in 1840.

Basalt cylinder seal of pharaoh Menkaure, from Egypt. Neues Museum, Berlin

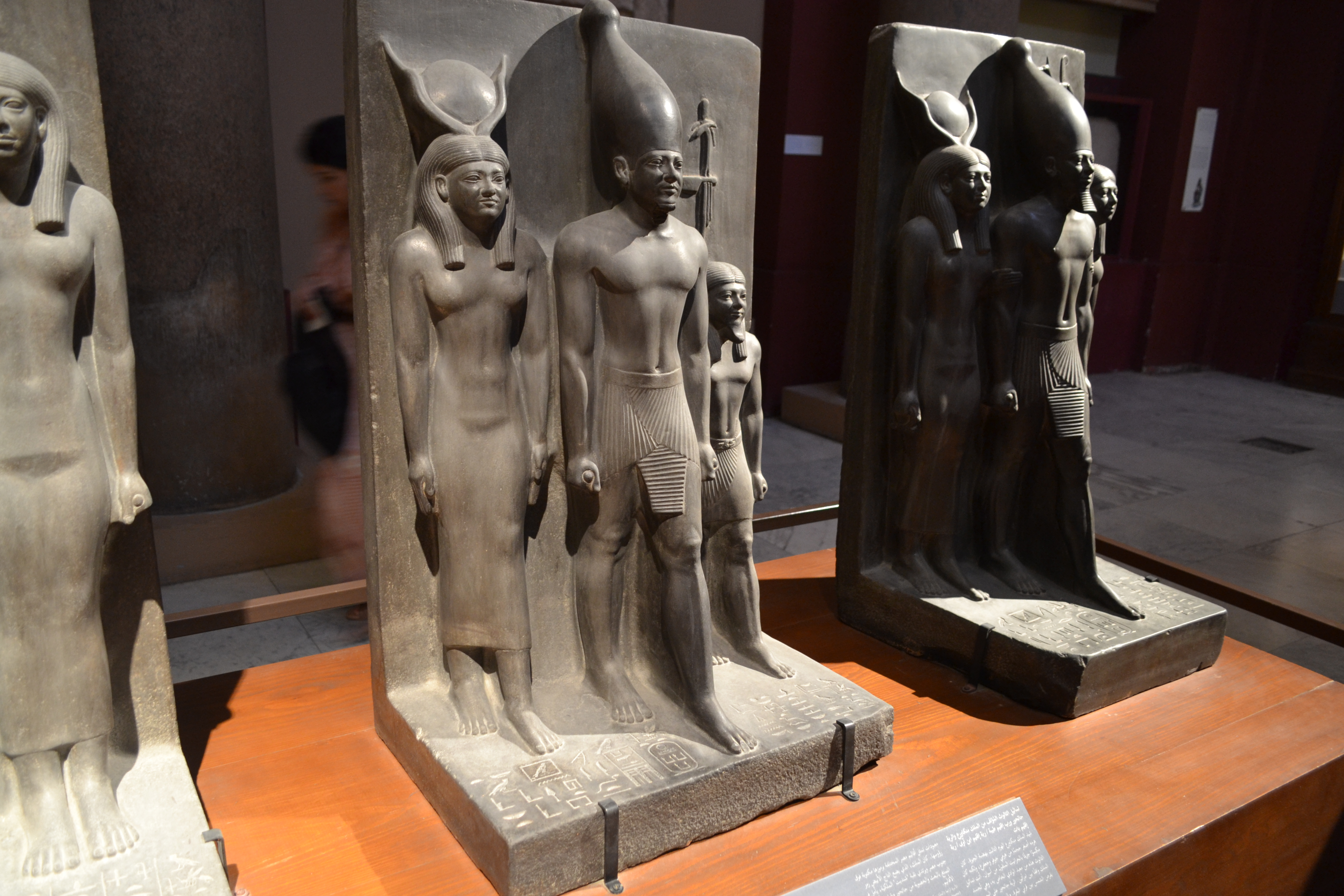
Greywacke Statue of Menkaure flanked by Hathor and Anput, Cairo Museum 2023
