= Stone vessels in ancient Egypt =

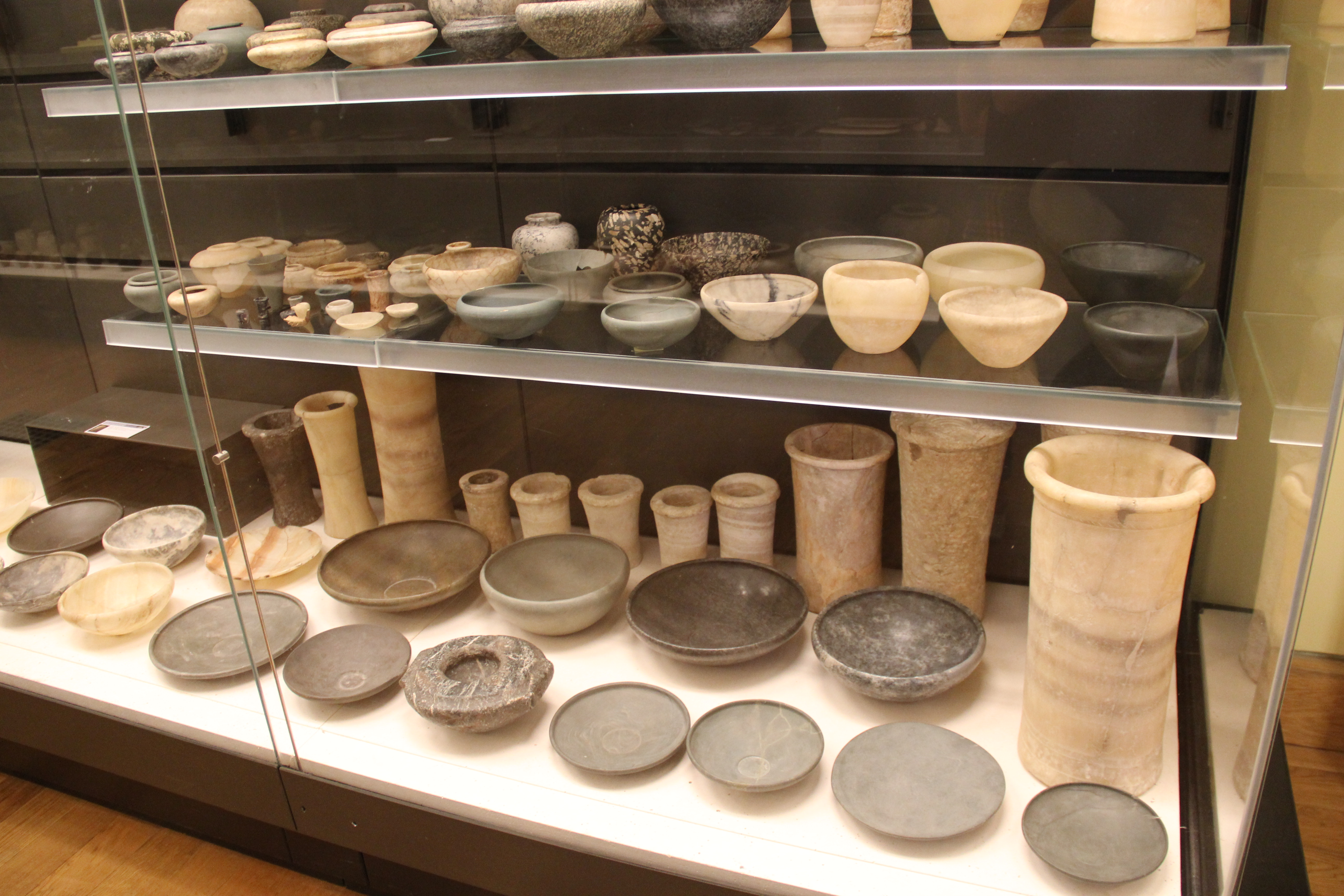
Collection of ancient Egyptian stone vessels at the Louvre

Ancient Egyptian stone vessel production was one of the most prolific and long-lived industries in the Mediterranean. Such vessels were an important status indicator, and commonly used to hold liquids or cosmetics, for ritual and display purposes, and as canopic jars.

The earliest stone vessels in Egypt date as far back as the Late Neolithic (c. 5100 – c. 4700 BC). From the Predynastic Period (c. 4000 – c. 3100 BC) onward, hundreds of thousands were created in a wide variety of shapes and materials, many from hard stones but the majority from soft calcareous rocks, especially travertine. Hard stone vessels were luxury items that only the elite had access to. As such, they were frequently imitated with less expensive materials. Production peaked around the early Dynastic period (c. 3100 – c. 2686 BC), perhaps due to the adoption of a turning device like the potter's wheel. At the start of the Old Kingdom focus shifted away from stone vessels towards other stone-based displays such as pyramids, statues and sarcophagi. They were also increasingly replaced by equivalents of different materials like glass, faience and precious metals. Both hard and soft stone vessels continued to be produced until the end of antiquity and beyond, although in diminished quantity and variety.

The production process of stone vessels began in a quarry, where vessel blanks (rough versions) were hewn from the bedrock. These were subsequently transported to workshops where they were hollowed out with drills. Sometimes rotary devices were used to shape them, perhaps potter's wheels or horizontal lathes. Lastly, their exterior was smoothed and decorated.

== Use ==
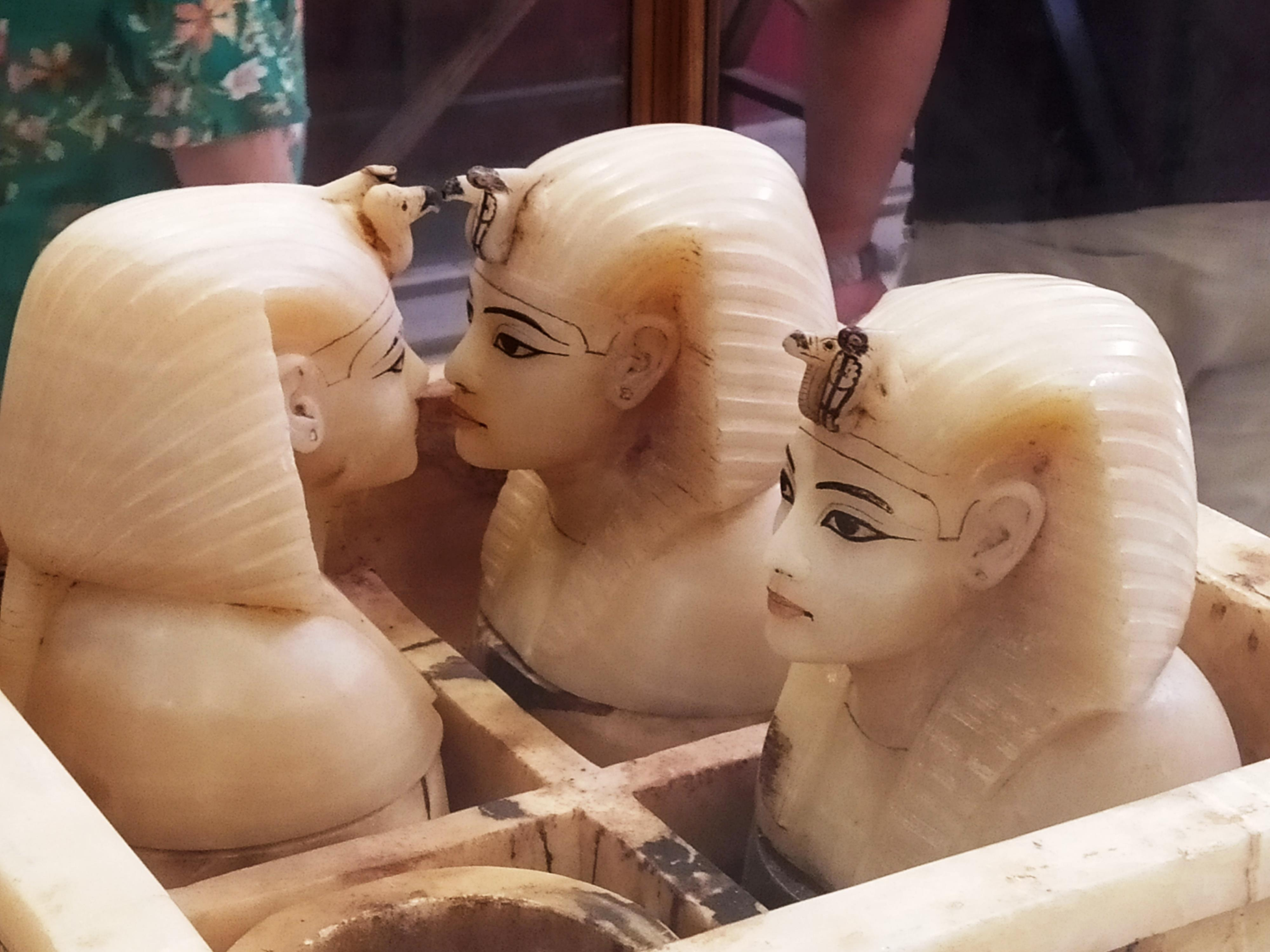
Canopic jars of Tutankhamun

Egyptian stone vessels were manufactured for everyday use, ritual and burial purposes (e.g. canopic jars), foundation deposits, temple votives, and as trade goods. They sometimes held substances like perfumes, oils, beverages or cosmetics like kohl. On their own, they had an ornamental value and were a status item that was distributed according to the steep social pyramid of ancient Egypt. Imitation pottery was available to a wider range of people.

Most stones vessels were uninscribed: Only a small portion bear the names of pharaohs or members of the royal family, titles or labels of their contents or capacity. The presence of a cartouche may mean that they originated from a royal workshop and intended for use by the royal family or as a reward for outstanding service or loyalty.

Dating stone vessels can be challenging, because they were sometimes reused, and vessels of similar shapes and materials were produced over a long time or in diverse periods.

19 stone jars, full of 'sweet oil', (called) azida
20 stone jars, full of 'sweet oil'; kubu is its name
20 stone jars (called) akunu, which are full of 'sweet oil'
9 kukkubu-containers, of stone, full of 'sweet oil'; namsa is its name
1 'cucumber', of stone, full of 'sweet oil'
6 very large stone vessels, full of 'sweet oil'
...

— Parts of the Egyptian countergifts to Tushratta, king of Mitanni

== Manufacturing process ==
The tools and techniques used to craft stone vessels differed significantly depending on the material. A soft stone vessel could be made in a few days with stone and copper chisels. Working hard stone was a lengthy process that could have taken over a year per vessel, hence they tend to be smaller and are less numerous. Evidence for the production process includes vessel blanks and tools found in quarries, unfinished vessels, hundreds of drill-bits, shaped grinders and drill-cores, blocks with test drillings as well as excavated workshops.

=== Quarrying ===
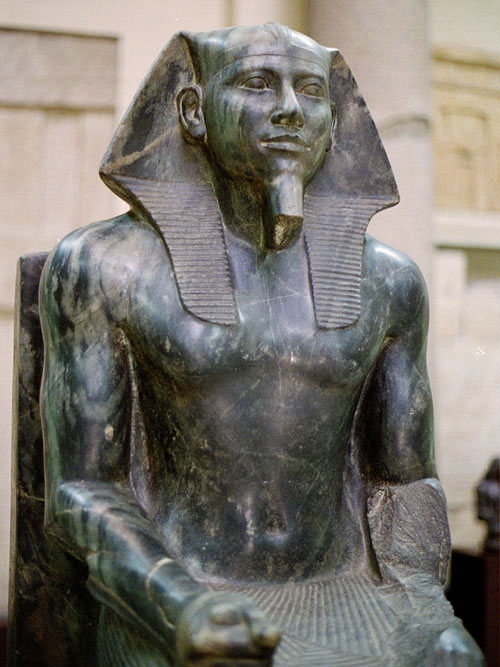
The gneiss of Khafre Enthroned came from the same quarry that had been mass-producing stone vessel blanks in the prior centuries

The quarrying of stone vessels was a multi-step process. The intermediate stages have been found in great quantities at multiple quarries. For example, at the anorthosite gneiss quarry at Gebel el-Asr, which was used almost exclusively to produce hard stone vessel blanks since the Predynastic Period (c. 4000 – c. 3100 BC), or slightly earlier. Large scale exploitation of the rock started in the Second Dynasty, and as many as 90,000 blanks may have been quarried there in total. By the end of the 3rd Dynasty (c. 2686 – c. 2613 BC), the higher-quality speckled variety of the stone was largely depleted and the lower quality subtype had to be used for the statues of the 4th and 5th Dynasty, such as Khafre Enthroned. In the 12th Dynasty the site briefly experienced a resurgence.

1. To extract a block from the bedrock, the surrounding soil and weathered rock fragments were removed first. This step could be skipped, if naturally detached boulders were available.
2. The block would then be split into smaller fragments (cores) that could contain the shape of a vessel. Large stone pounders were employed for this task with a diameter up to 40 cm (16 in). For soft stones, copper chisels, wedges, saws and adzes were used. Fire-induced spalling technology was available, however usually not needed for smaller rocks.
3. Each core was then worked with hand-axes or smaller pounders, by chipping off shards until a rough version of the vessel (a blank) was achieved.
4. The quarried blanks were then transported to workshops in the Nile Valley where they were finished.

=== Rotary devices ===
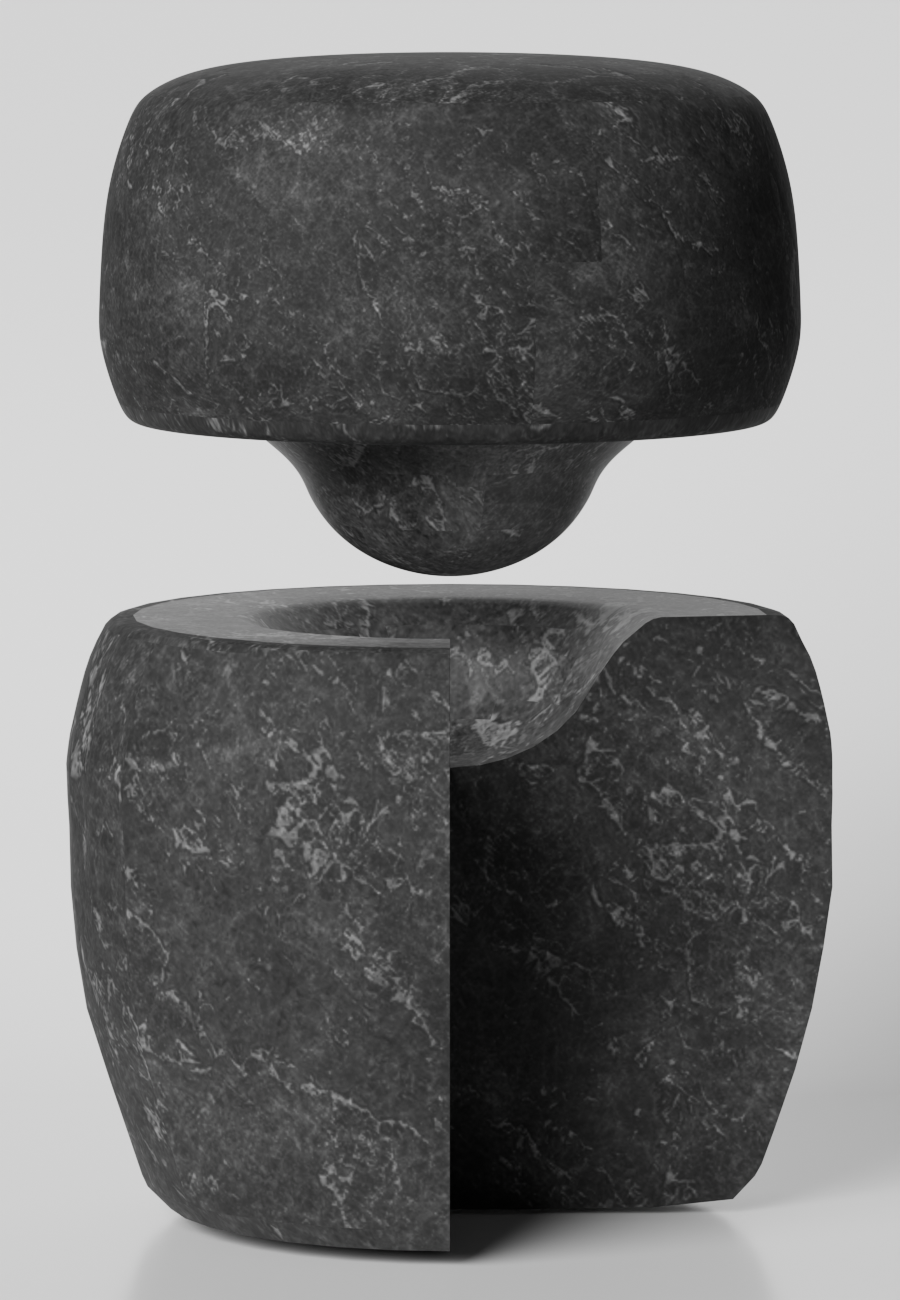
Stone bearings of a potter's wheel from ancient Egypt (rendering). A heavy wheel head would be fixed to the upper stone, which was then spun to fashion clay or a glued-down stone vessel blank.

The earliest evidence for a rotary device being used on Egyptian pottery goes back to the Naqada I period (c. 3600 BC). The insides of stone vessels were drilled since at least Naqada II (c. 3500 – c. 3200 BC). Rotary abrasion marks appear on the outsides of stone vessels as early as the Old Kingdom. Andrew Bevan suggests these striations to indicate the use of horizontal lathes or potter's wheels. The Potter's wheel was first used in the Near East between c. 4500 – c. 4000 BC, and in the Nile delta by Canaanite potters c. 3500 – c. 3300 BC. Preserved Egyptian wheel bearings consist of an upper pivot and a lower socket usually of basalt, granodiorite or limestone. Experiments showed their design to be capable of spinning at over 100 rotations per minute, if the stone surfaces were well polished and lubricated with viscous oil like linseed oil.

Unfortunately, we have no really satisfactory evidence of the method of manufacture of these [early dynastic] stone vessels, and, although certain processes of the work are known to us, others remain a complete mystery. How did they achieve such accuracy that when we 'swing' a shallow bowl or dish, no deviation from a perfect circle can be noted? How did they cut rock crystal tubular jars with walls not more than a millimetre thick? Although we have no evidence, it would appear almost certain that the craftsman had some method of rotating the material against a fixed tool, for it would be impossible to obtain such accuracy purely by hand chiselling and grinding by measurements, no matter how numerous or how painstakingly done.

— Walter Bryan Emery, Archaic Egypt. 1961., p. 214–215

==== Drills ====
To hollow the vessels out, an entry hole was made with a tubular copper flywheel drill, in combination with loose abrasive powder (e.g. quartz sand) which did the cutting. To prevent breakage during the drilling process, the vessels were put in a hole to stabilize the walls.

Extracted drill cores have a conical form and bear fine, even striations from the abrasives that embedded themselves into the matrix of the copper.

The hole was then widened with various flint gouges or shaped grinders that were driven with a weighted drill. Since the insides of the vessels were usually not polished afterwards, they retained their concentric drill marks. Flint gouges produced round interior cavities with coarse, irregular striations; shaped grinders more uniform curved slots, with finer striations.

Other methods of drilling are using a horizontal lathe, a bit-and-brace mechanism and a drill pump mechanism. Evidence for these techniques is scant, especially for earlier times.

=== Refining ===
The exteriors of vessels were smoothed by hand, leaving diagonal abrasion marks. Some types of vessels had handles, which were often perforated by a chipped flint drill-bit. Polishing was time-consuming and thus done to various extents. Rotary devices may have helped speed up this process.

Some Egyptian workshops applied wax or oil to give their stone vessels a smooth and shiny look, while others finely polished the outer surface.

As a final step, decorations such as gilding, inscriptions and accessories were added.

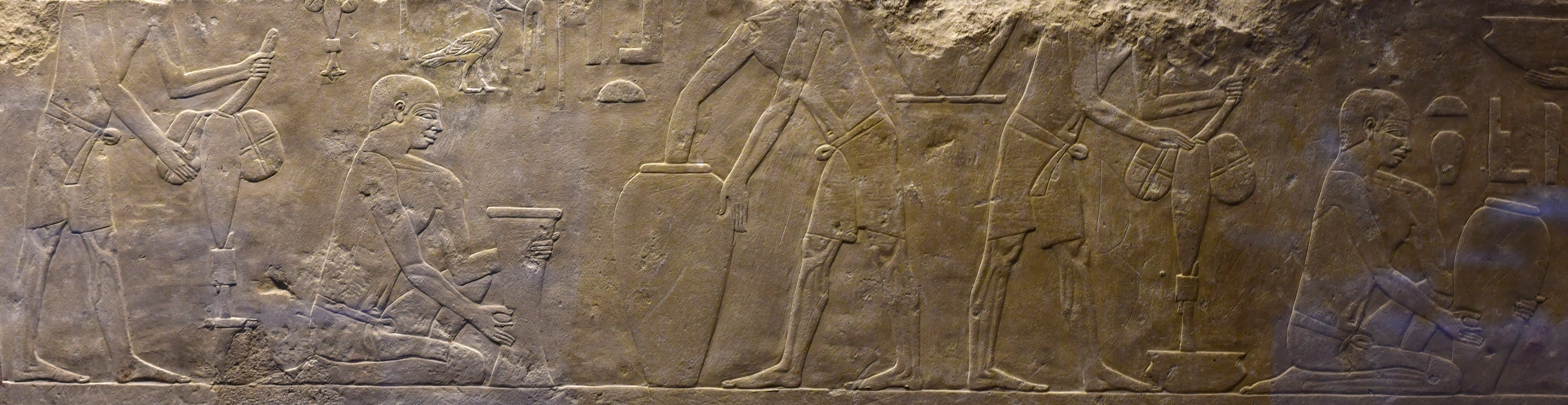
Drilling and polishing of stone vessels, a relief of a 5th Dynasty tomb at Saqqara

==== Modern surface analysis ====
An interferometry analysis revealed microscopic striations from the polishing process on the surface of an Egyptian vase.

A study of predynastic stone vessels from the Petrie Museum using 3D scans concluded them to be handmade due to their quality being "virtually indistinguishable" from modern handmade objects.

== History ==
=== Background and context ===
Stone vessels were produced in West Asia as early as the Epipaleolithic (c. 20,000 – c. 9600 BC). During the Early Neolithic (c. 9600 – c. 6500 BC), a wide variety of stone vessels appear at numerous sites. For example, at Göbekli Tepe 600 stone vessels were discovered, including limestone vessels and platters, large troughs, as well as small "greenstone" vessels which had thin walls and were often decorated with geometric patterns.

In the southern Levant, vessels made from basalt and other hard stones appear in the Early Chalcolithic (c. 5800 – c. 4600 BC). In the Late Chalcolithic (c. 4500 – c. 3700 BC) the number and sophistication of these vessels increased. The exceptional quality of production (symmetrical, thin walls, great surface refinement and elaborate decorations) continued in the Early Bronze Age (c. 3700 – c. 2500 BC).

Stone vessels were traded between the cultures of the eastern Mediterranean throughout the Bronze Age, and their styles influenced each other. For example, in Crete, Minoan craftsmen produced their own types of stone vessels throughout the third and second millennium BC, however during certain periods they also imitated, imported and sometimes reworked Egyptian ones. Finished and unfinished vessels, as well as drill cores suggest the two cultures used very similar techniques.

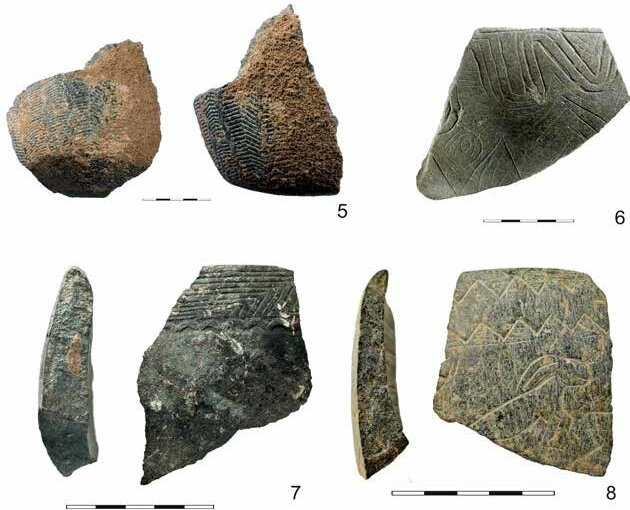
Greenstone vessel fragments from Göbekli Tepe

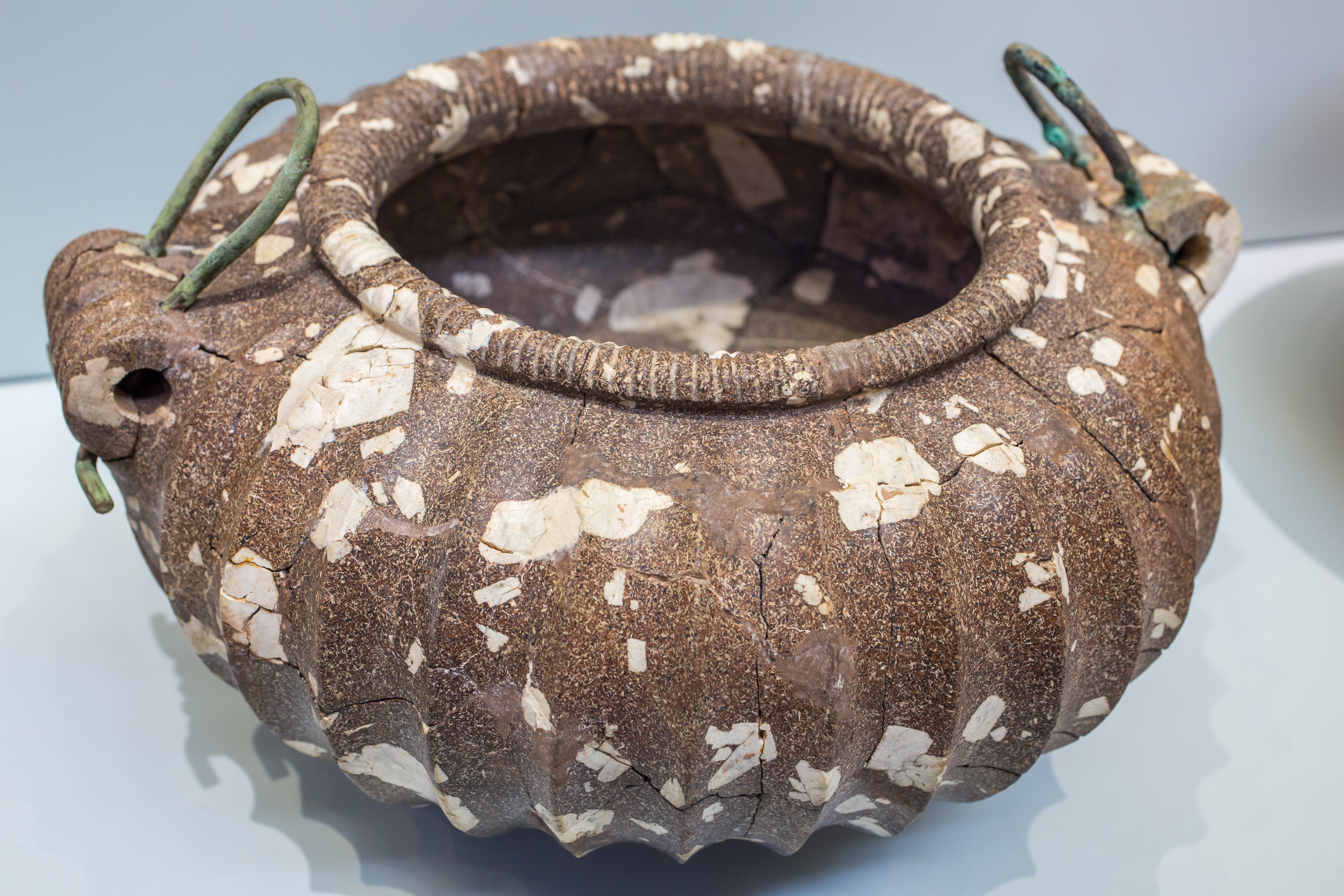
Egyptian bowl, with rim and handles reworked in neopalatial Crete

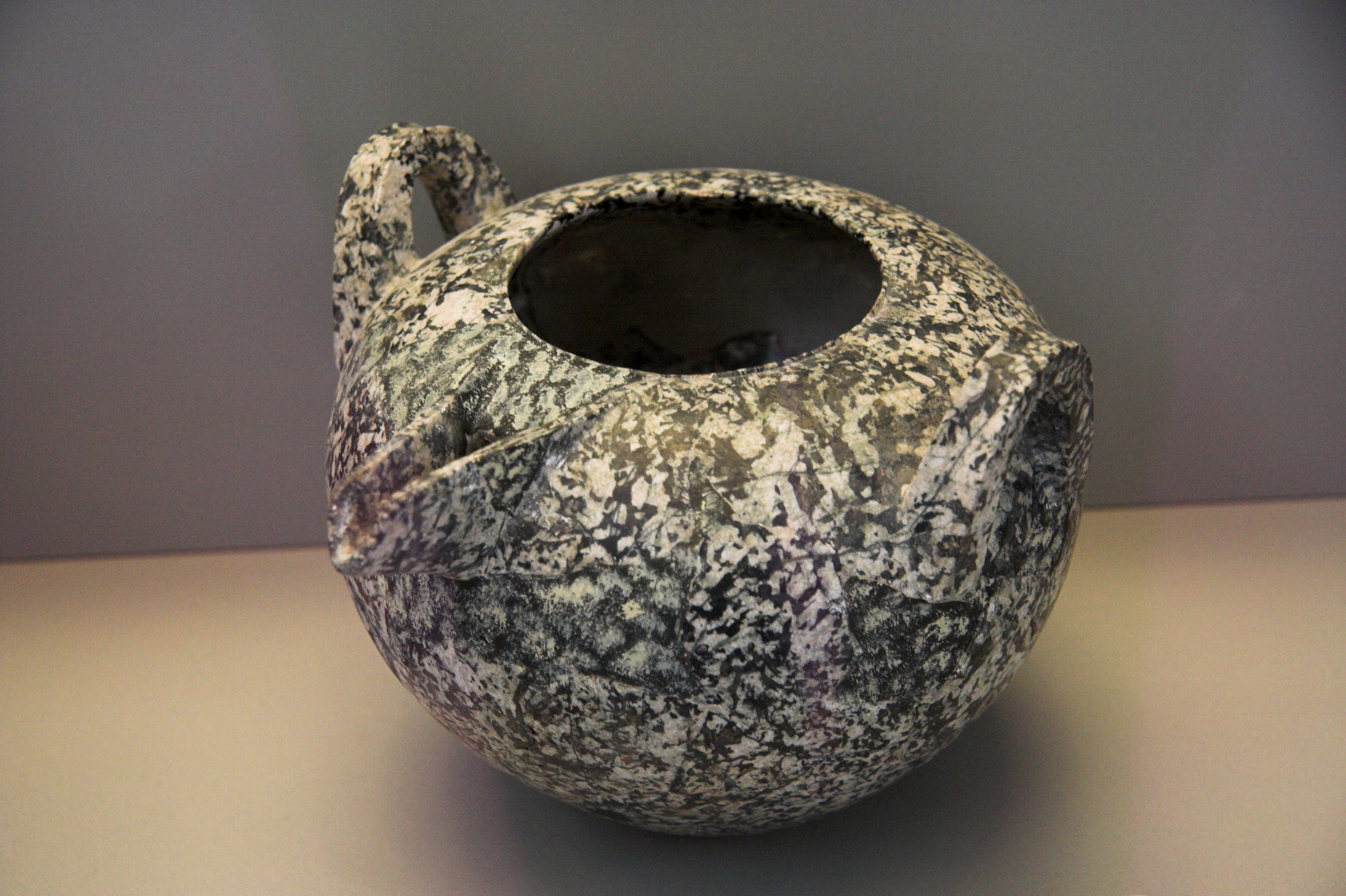
Minoan gabbro bridge-spouted jar, exported to Mycene, c. 1900 – c. 1700 BC

=== Predynastic Period ===
In Egypt, the earliest recorded stone vessels date to the Late Neolithic (c. 5100 – c. 4700 BC).

At the beginning of the Naqada II period (c. 3600 – c. 3200 BC), basalt vessels, quarried at Haddadin (west of Cairo), start to appear in the tombs of the sites around Maadi. They are mostly baggy cylinders and lugged ovoid jars, shapes that have equivalents in pottery and ivory.

At the same time, Upper Egypt had a far more sophisticated mortuary culture. Tombs include imported Lower Egyptian basalt vessels, and similarly shaped versions made from local materials such as red-white breccia limestone. The limited availability of such items lead to the production of pottery imitations. Another popular vessel style was the heart-shaped jar.

At the end of Naqada II, Upper Egyptian pottery start appearing in large numbers, while traditional Lower Egyptian basalt vessels decline. New zoomorphic stone vessels and palettes, as well as wavy-handles jars and multiple-tube block vessels replace them. The heart-shaped jars now have sharper rims and are sometimes gilded. Changes in political power structures would have significant impacts on the material culture in the following centuries as well.

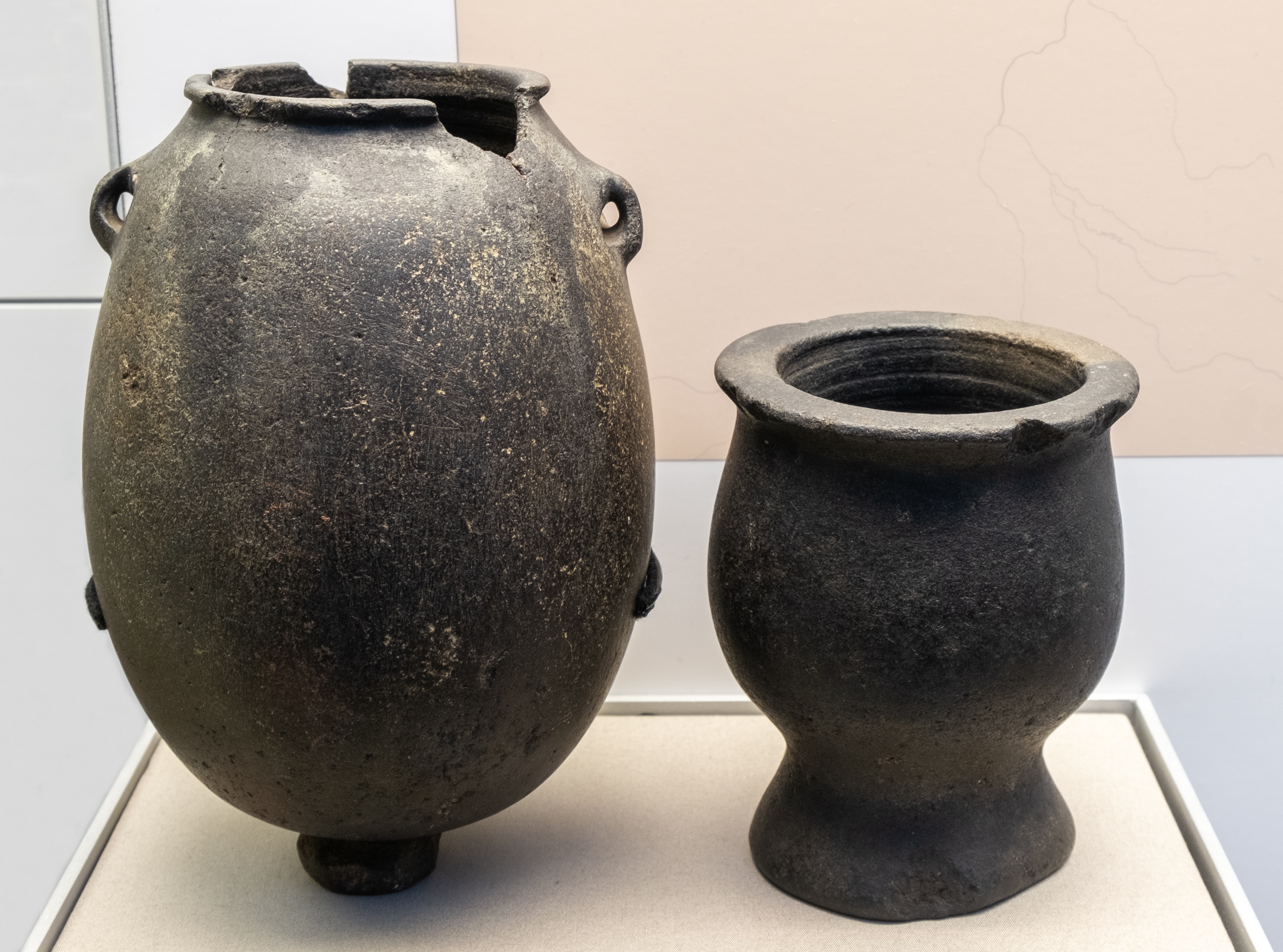
Basalt jars from predynastic Maadi
(height: c. 10 cm (3.9 in))

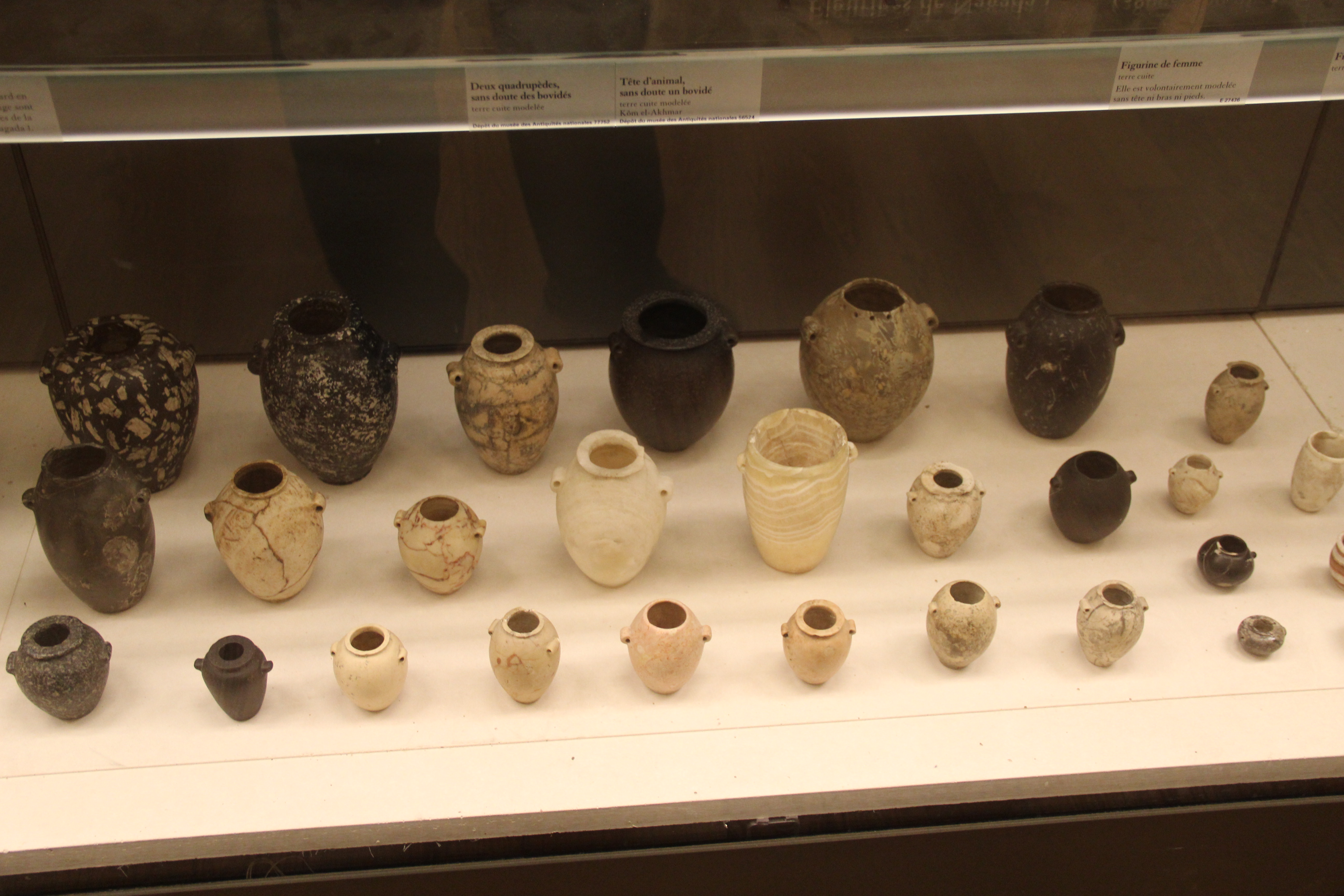
A variety of hard and soft stone vessels

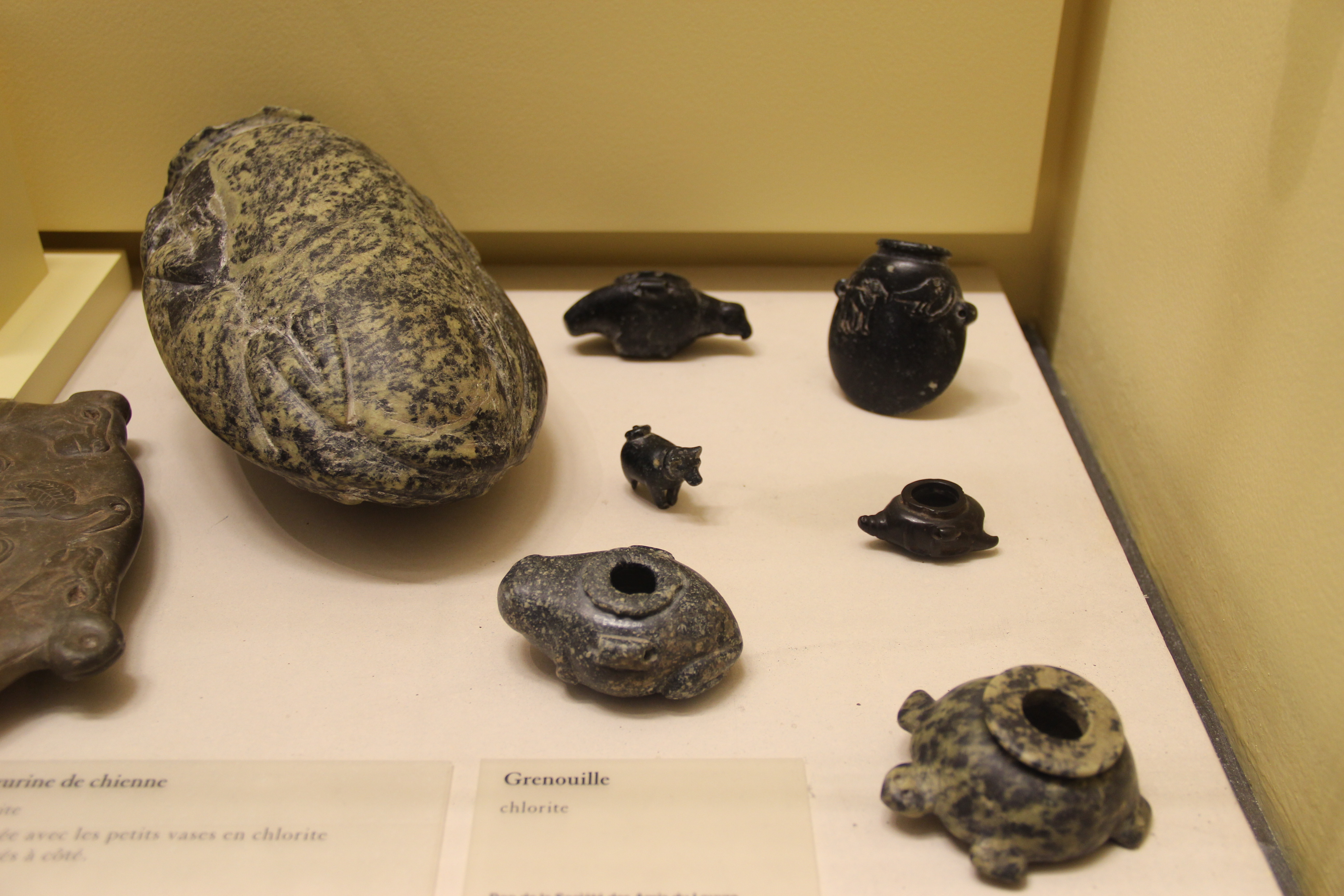
Zoomorphic vessels

=== Early Dynastic Period ===
During the Early Dynastic Period (c. 3300 – c. 2900 BC) the uppermost classes increasingly competed for power and prestige, with an ever increasing emphasis on mortuary display. The quantity and quality of stone vessels drastically increased in the wealthiest tombs. For example, the First Dynasty cemetery at Abydos contained 50,000–100,000 vessel fragments of metasiltstone and travertine and 10,000–20,000 of hard stones. Vessel production peaked during this period. Softer stones such as travertine and metasiltstone were most common. Some hard stones like black andesite porphyry and white phenocrysts were popular only in the First and Second Dynasty, and otherwise rare. Cosmetic palettes, which had been produced since the Neolithic, and became exceptionally elaborate in late Naqada II–III, were discontinued at the start of the First Dynasty.

Several new manufacturing techniques appear during this time, indicating widespread experimentation. Striations from drills on the inside of the vessels become less coarse, suggesting shaped grinding stones rather than flint gouges were used as drill bits. Obsidian and quartz-crystal vessels show the improved technical skill and the desire to show off by using the toughest rocks available. Some features were purely for display and had no practical purpose. For example, bowls were made with a cylindrical impression, using large-diameter tube drills, from the First Dynasty onward.

Innovation and elaboration was followed by imitation, substitution and mass production. For instance, lower elites would use composite vessels, which allowed the usage of smaller pieces of stone, reduced the risk of breakage during production and didn't require the time-consuming process of undercutting the shoulder of the vessel. This technique became somewhat common, just as vessel production reached its peak and the masterful displays of hard stone vessel crafting techniques also appear.

During the Second Dynasty, vessel production continued in large quantity and variety. Focus started to shift toward a new range of materials such as carnelian, recrystallized limestone. Anorthosite gneiss was quarried for the first time at a large scale, and continued to be a popular higher-value material throughout the Old Kingdom. A trend towards more elaborate metallic vessels emerges, which may in part explain the downtrend of stone vessels in the following dynasties.

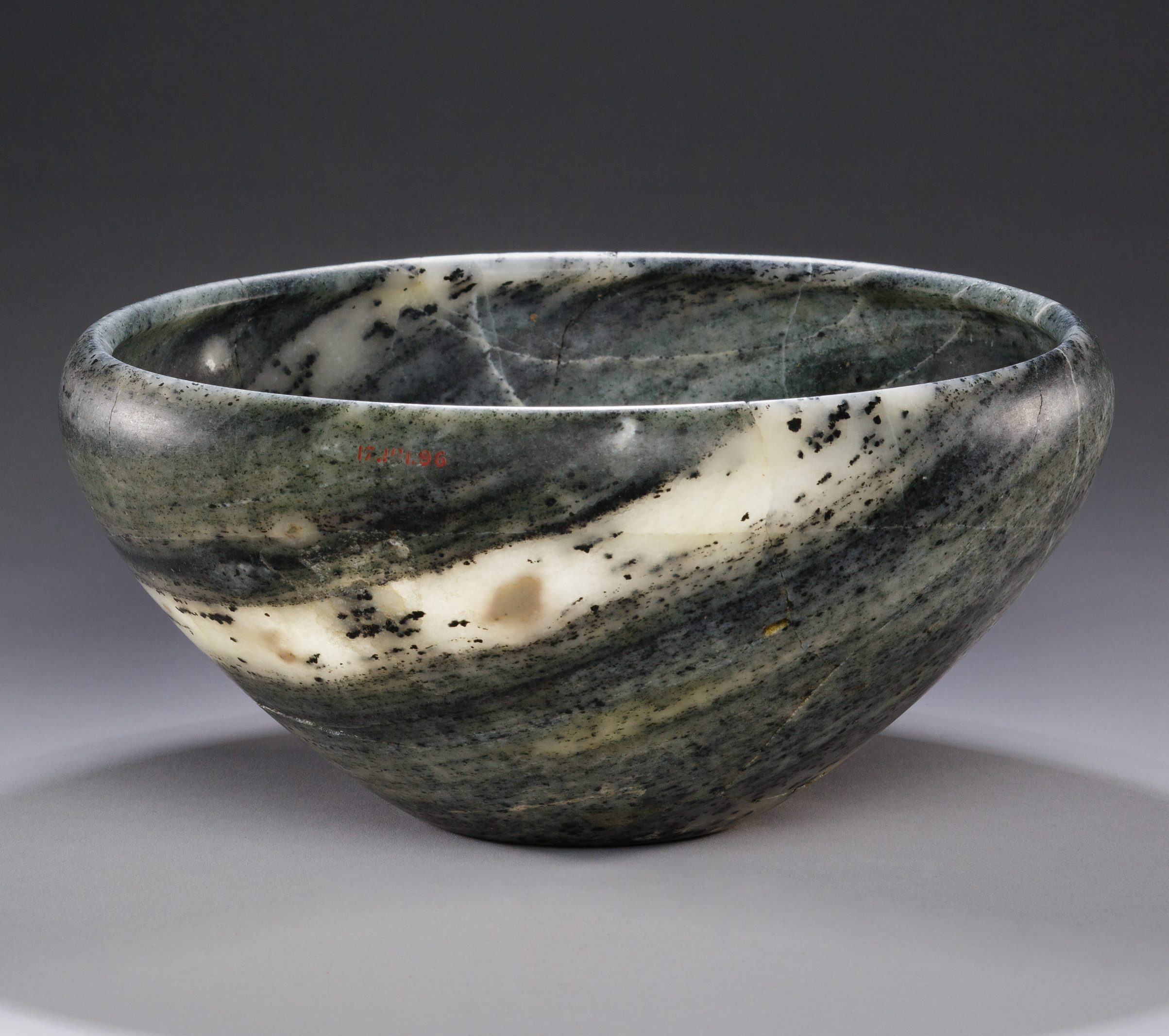
Dioritic gneiss bowl of the 2nd Dynasty

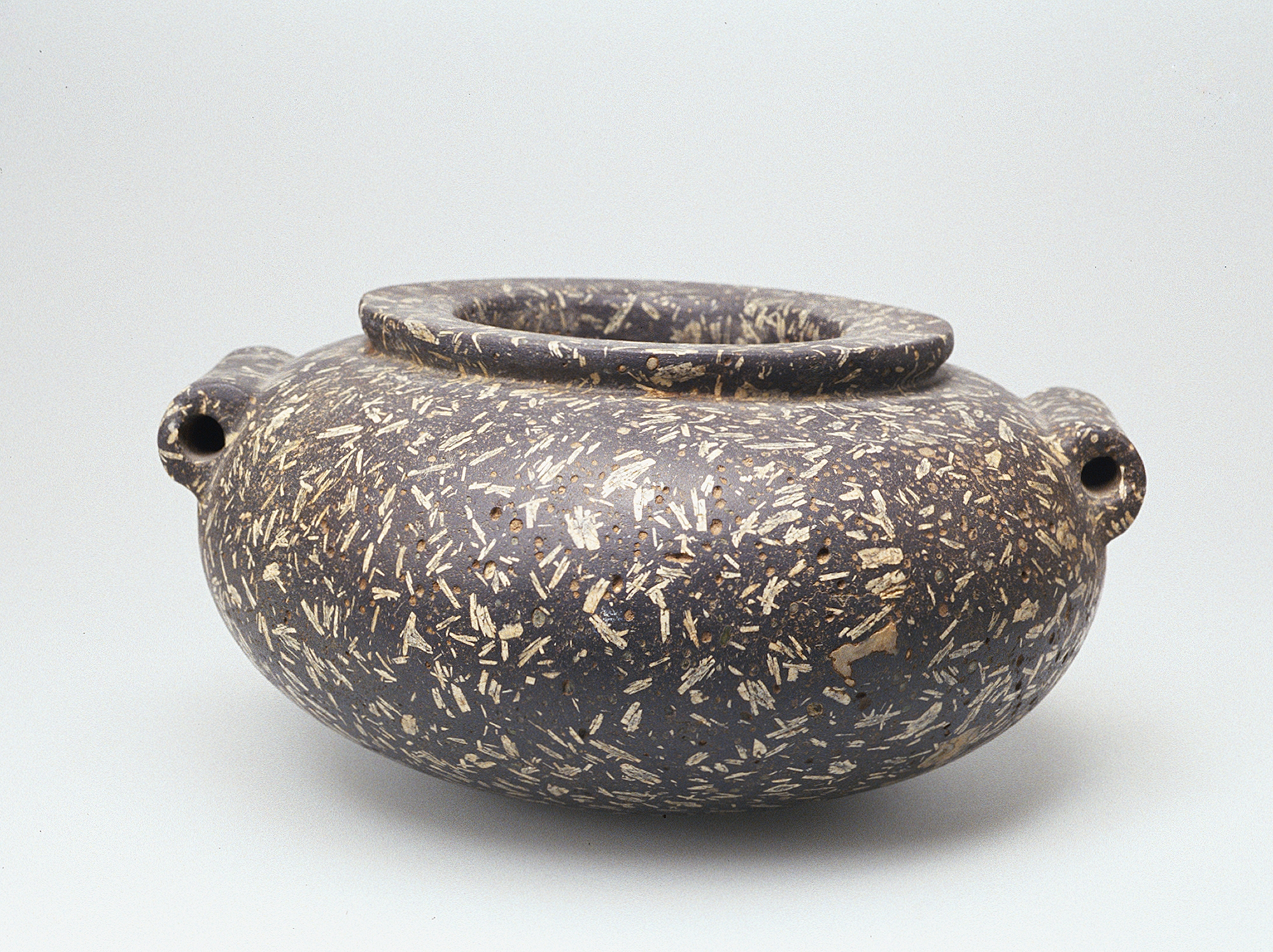
Early Dynastic porphyritic vessel with lug handles

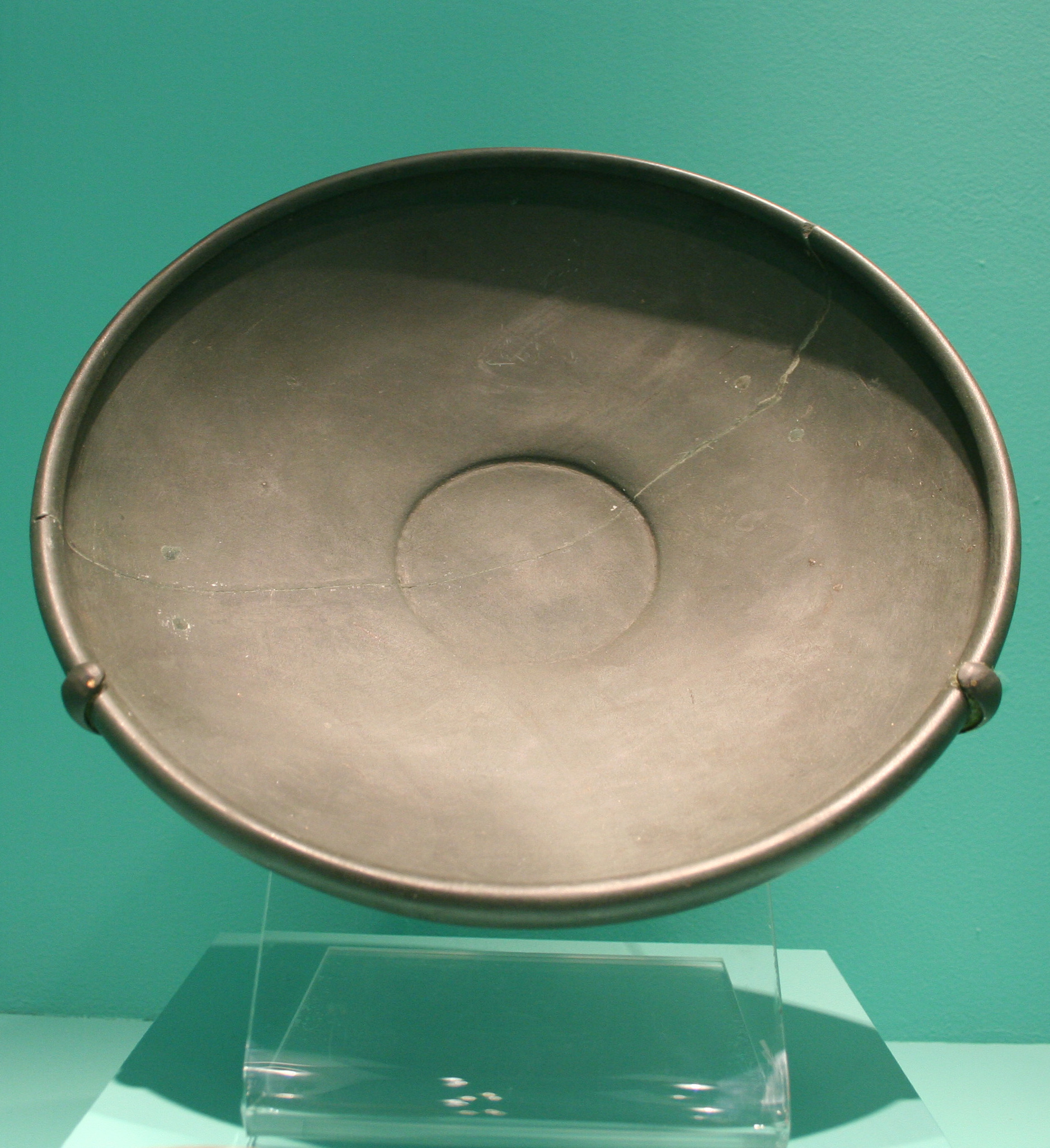
Bowl with circular impression, a 1st Dynasty vessel-making technique

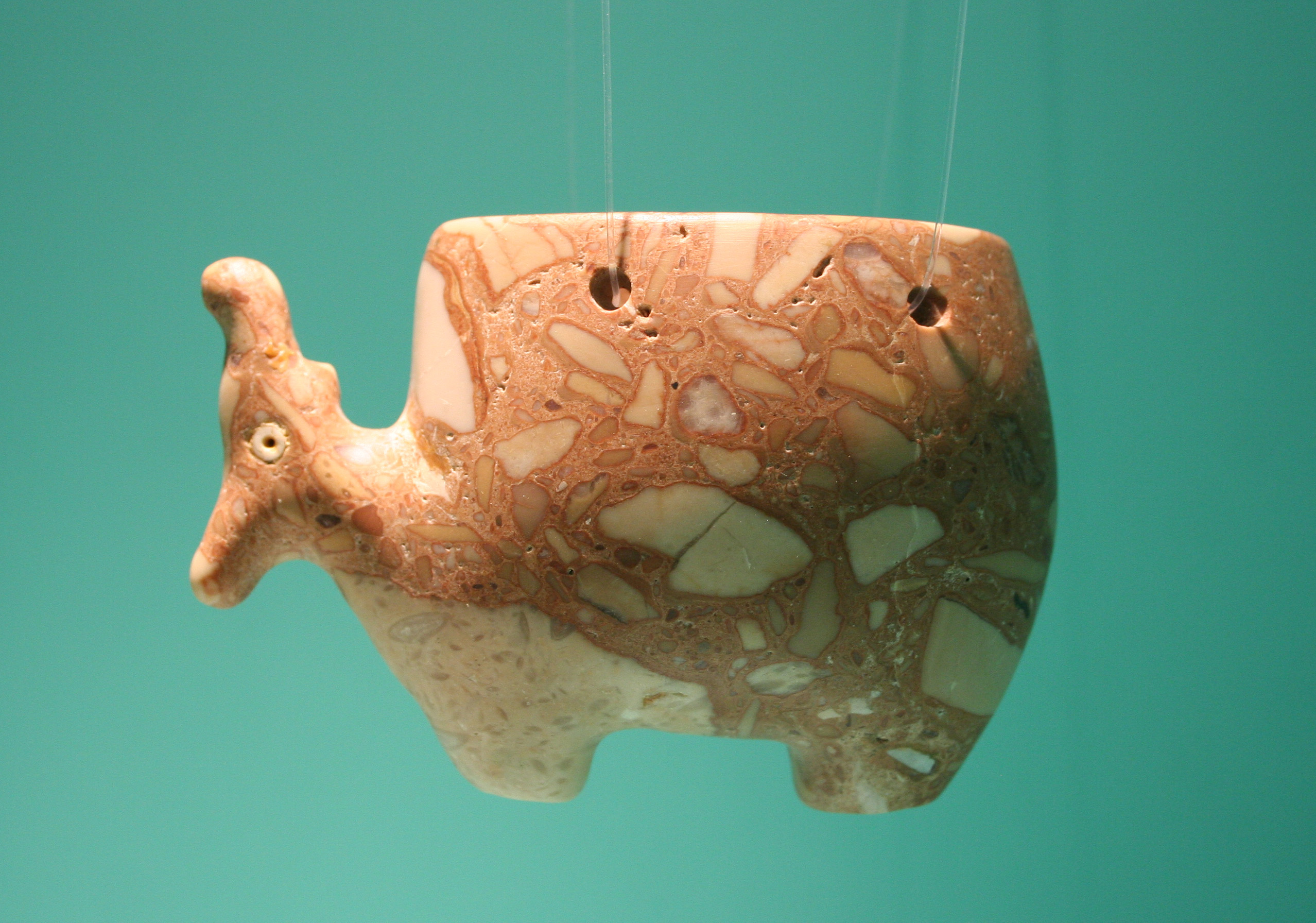
Zoomorphic breccia vessel, c. 3000 BC

=== Old Kingdom ===
The Pyramid of Djoser was the prototype for the pyramid building projects of the Old Kingdom rulers, which required a monumental diversion of material, human labor and stone-working expertise away from stone vessel production. For instance, the work-gang inscriptions found at first almost exclusively on stone vessels, are thereafter primarily present on quarry walls and the stones of monuments. Contrary to popular belief, quarrying and sculpting stone required highly skilled, but relatively few artisans.

Two unrobbed galleries under Djoser's pyramid were packed with 90 t (200,000 lb) or at least 30,000 vessels of mostly travertine, but also of hard stone, for example 892 of gneiss. Many of the vessels are of types popular during Naqada II or the earlier dynasties and some are inscribed with the names of Djoser's predecessors, meaning they were heirlooms, private donations, or even plundered or drawn from old stores. Unfinished examples are also among the collection. This suggests that the stone vessel industry was diverted to the construction of the pyramid complex.

4th Dynasty tombs show that the average quantity, quality and diversity of vessels was in decline. Early dynastic examples were reused. At the same time, hard stone statues and sarcophagi were increasingly made. Gneiss, basalt and granite were extensively used as building materials and for sculptures, but rarely for vessels. Again, this implies a redirection of skilled labor from stone vessel production.

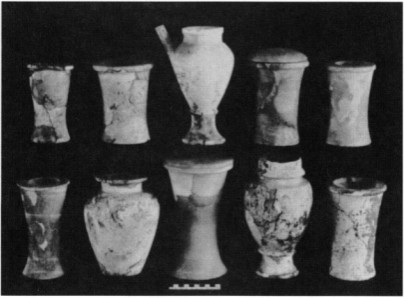
Stone vessel set of Hetepheres I

The funerary cache of Hetepheres I at Giza included several traditional stone bowls and oil jars that were left slightly rough. The metal vessels however are finely polished, suggesting they were more prestigious. One jar contained green kohl. Seven were kept together as a prescribed set of "seven sacred oils", and labeled with oil names. These special oils took many days to prepare and were associated with cleanliness, the union with gods, the renewal of the body, and the process of passing the seven gates of the underworld.

These trends continued in the 5th and 6th Dynasties, and defined the role of the stone vessel throughout the remainder of pharaonic history. Foundation deposits of temples sometimes contained dumped and decommissioned remains of Early Dynastic elite culture. Sacred oil sets became increasingly common, other stone vessels are used for the opening of the mouth ceremony and Sed festival. Royal tombs continued to be furnished with stone vessels, for instance lamps of gneiss and travertine. But many elites were no longer over-investing in these types of prestige items. For instance the vizier Mereruka, the owner of the largest known Old Kingdom tomb, chose to be buried with only a few large stone vessels, but a large number of miniature model vessels.

The amount of small vessels peaked in the mid 6th Dynasty and drastically declined in the First Intermediate Period.

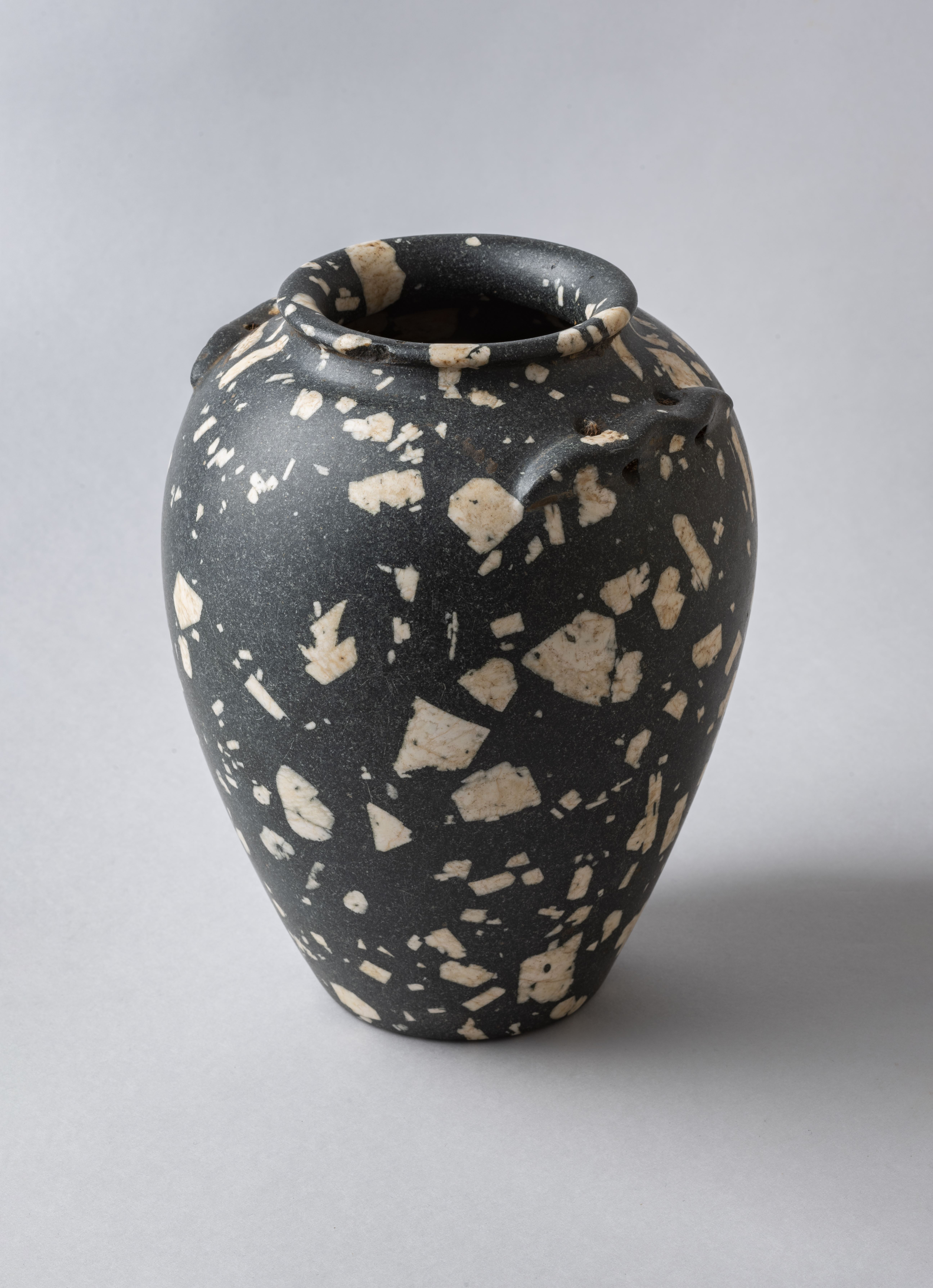
Porphyritic andesite jar with wavy handles

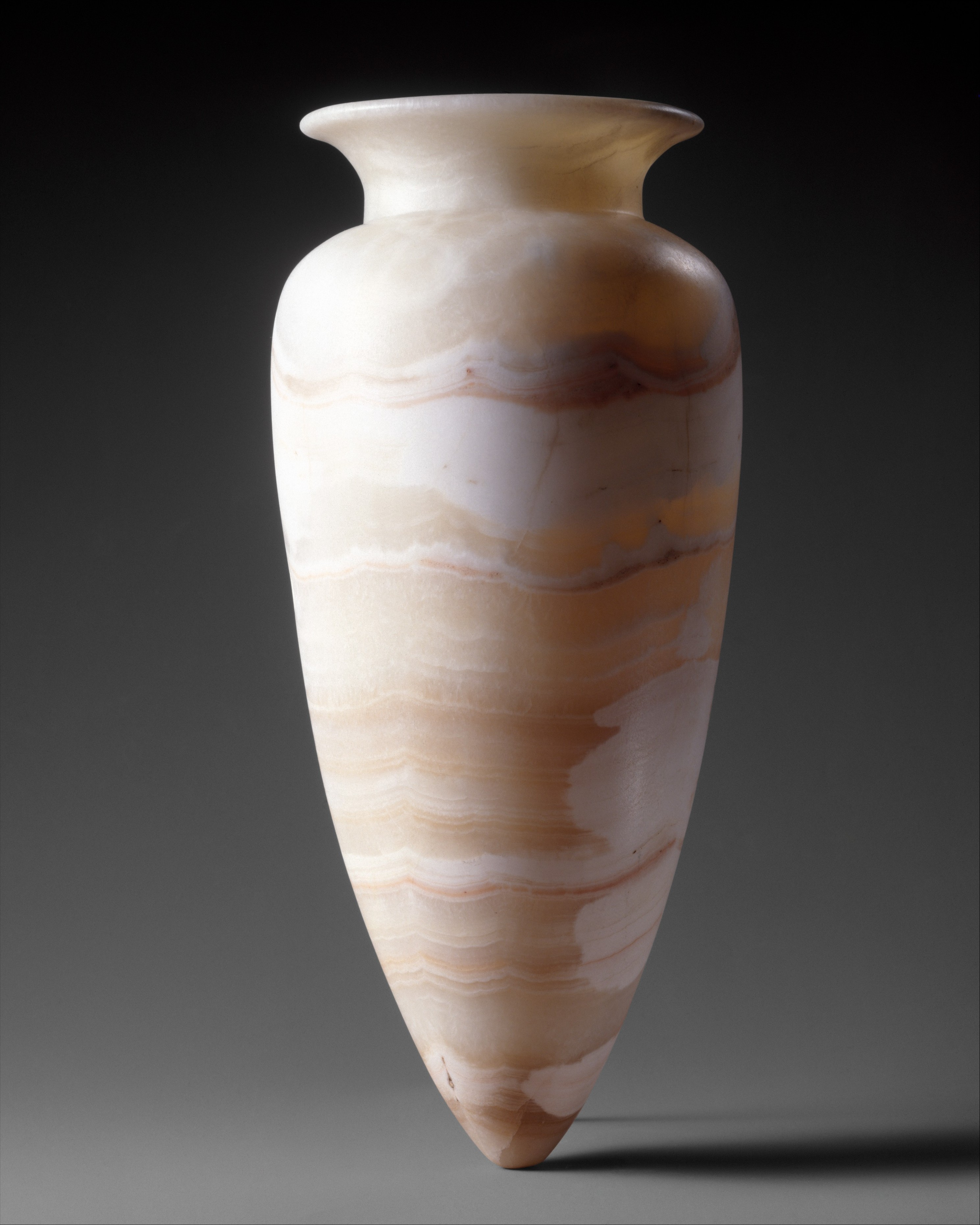
Large travertine high-shouldered jar

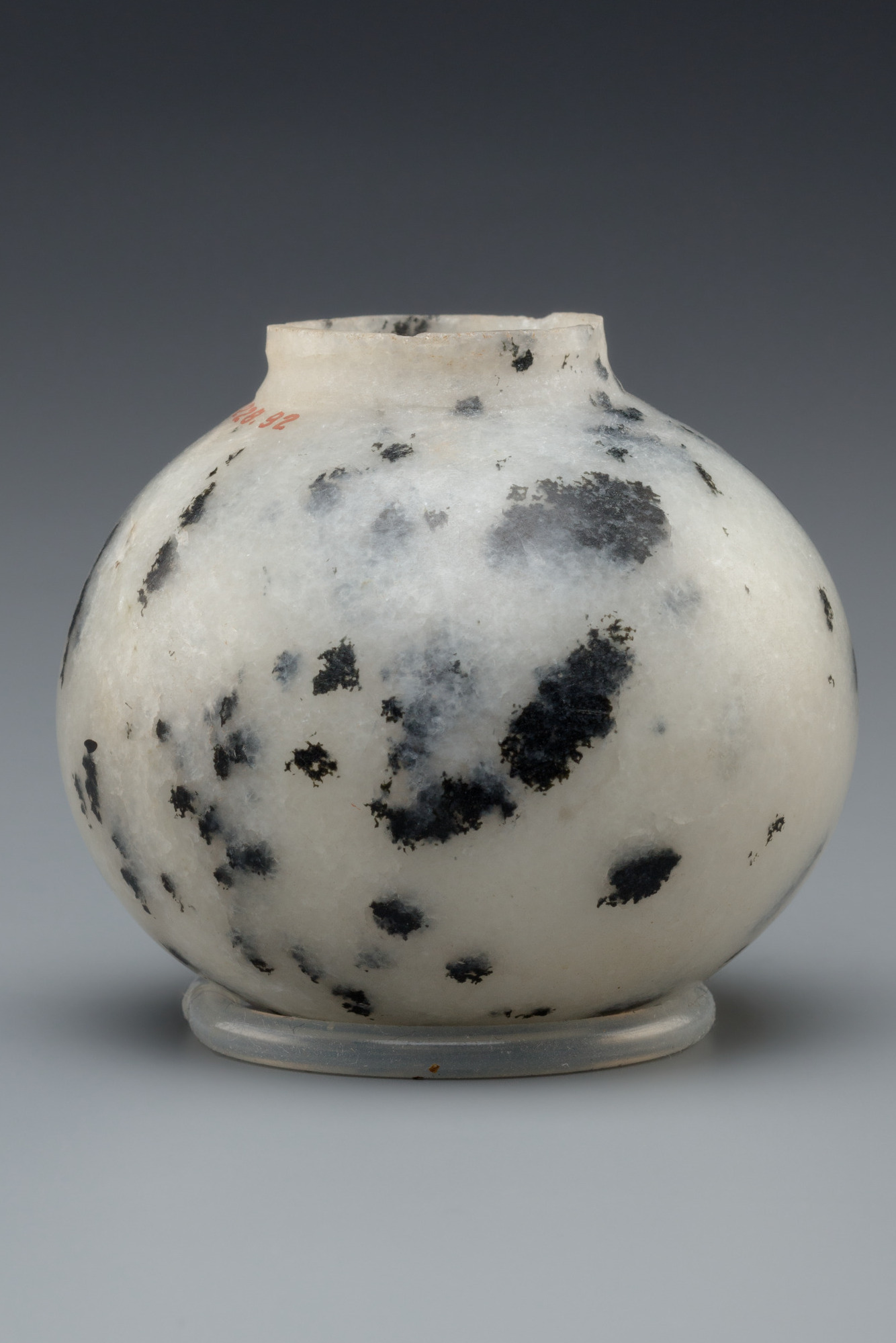
Miniature "nw" gneiss pot

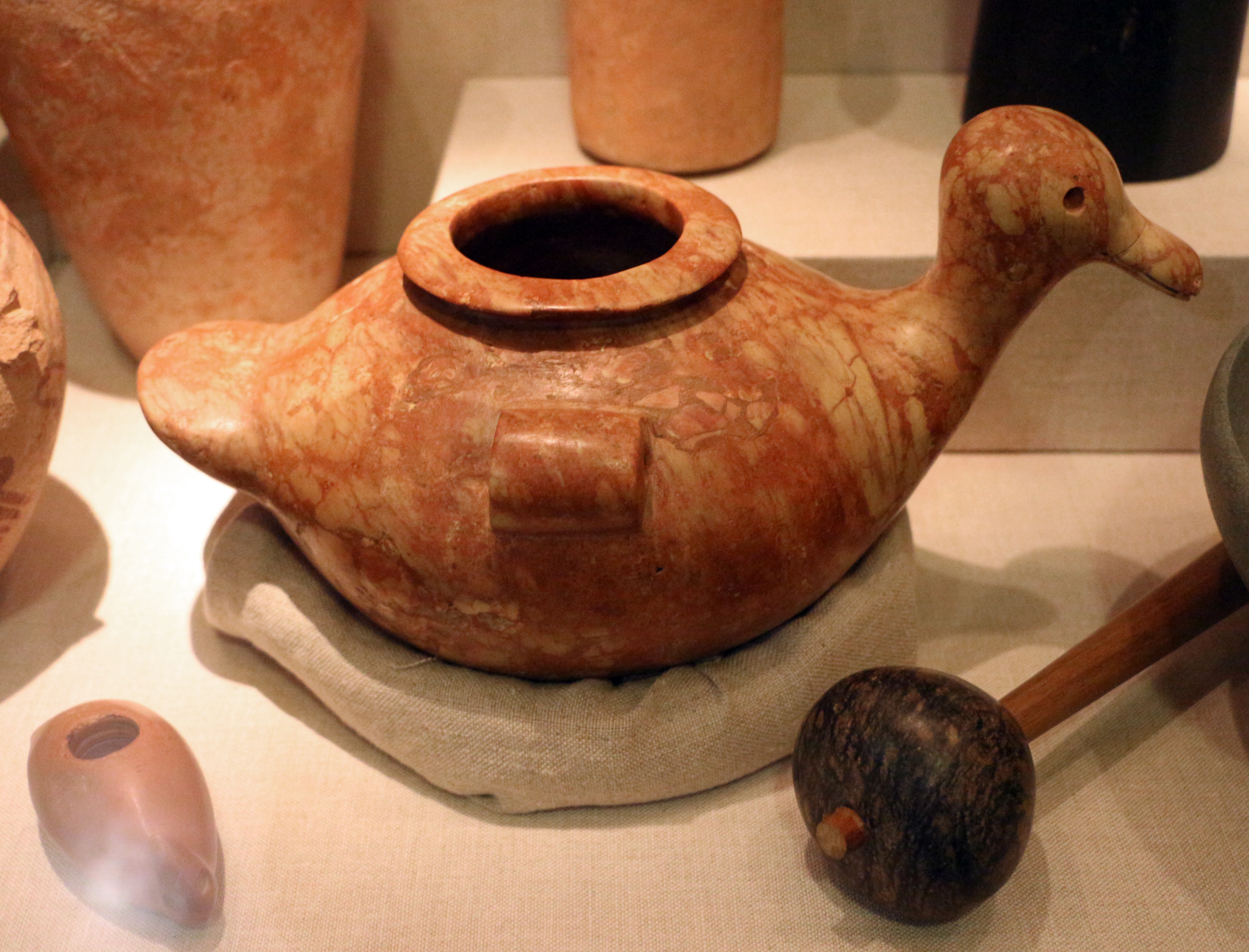
Duck-shaped vessel

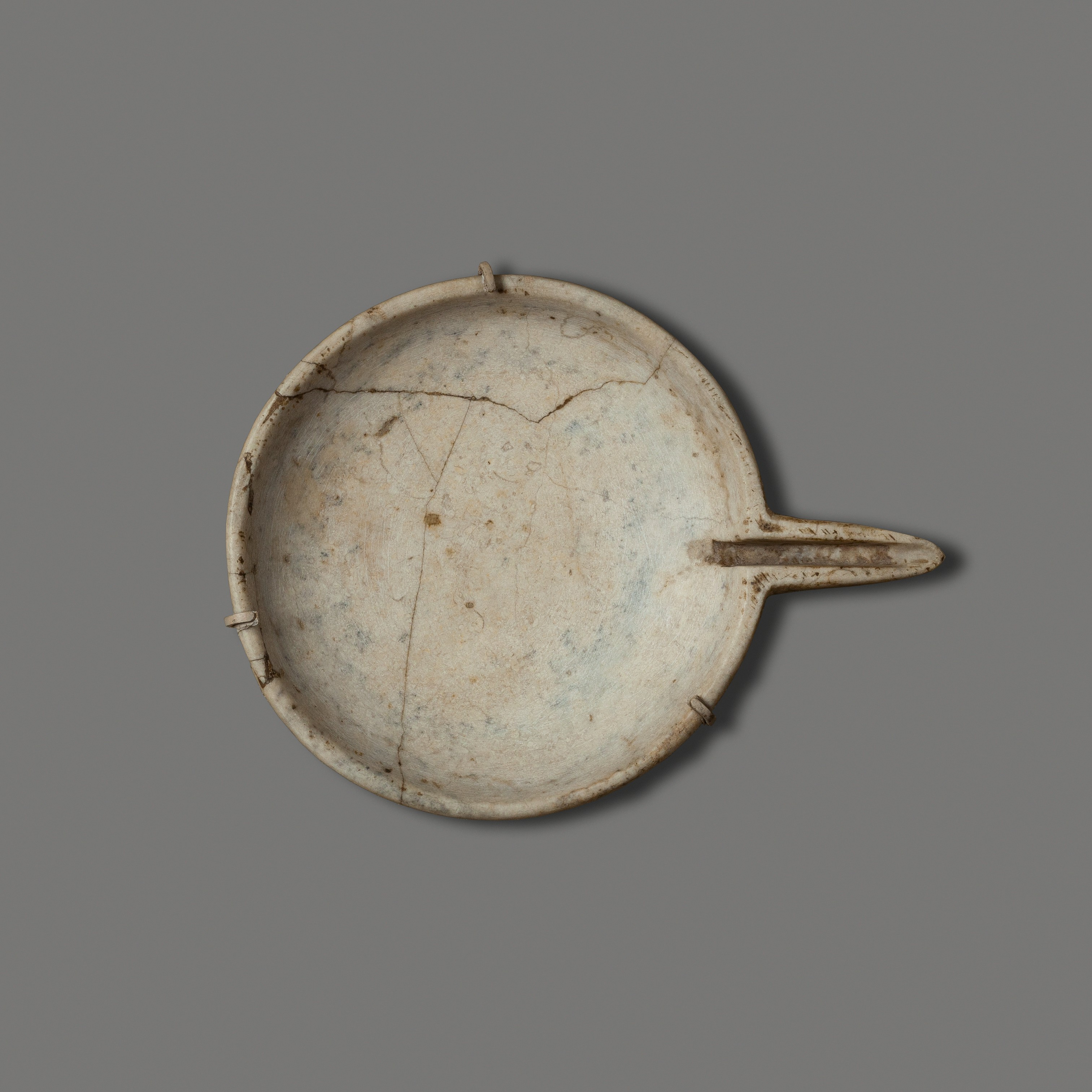
Drinking cup

=== Middle Kingdom and Second Intermediate Period ===
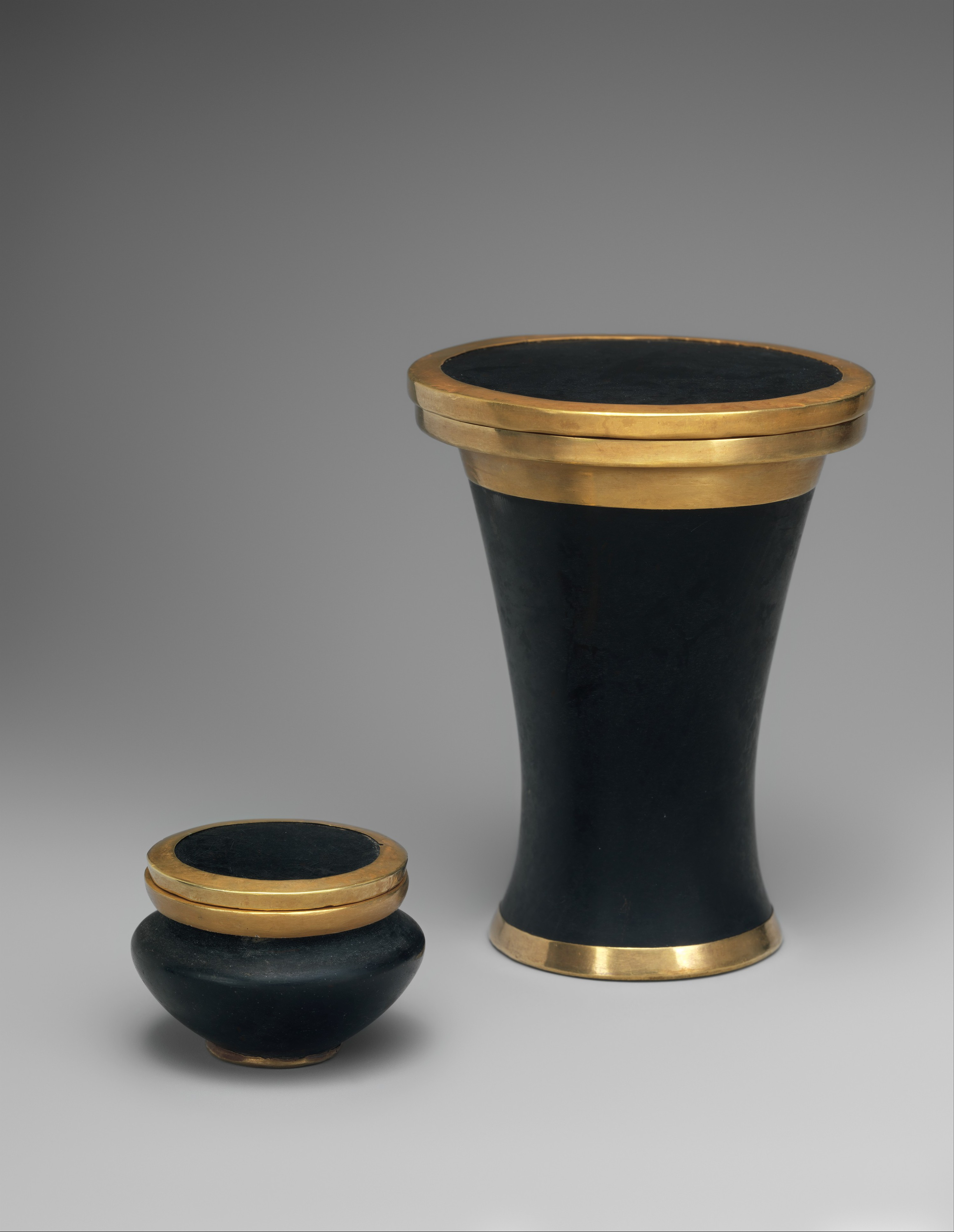
Gilded obsidian vessels, tomb of Sithathoriunet

In the Middle Kingdom cosmetic containers were used more often, whereas tableware like bowls and pouring vessels became rare. New shapes were developed, such as the alabastron and everted rim jar. By far the most common type of stone vessel during this time was the newly developed kohl pot used for eye makeup. Travertine continued to be the most used material. Anorthosite gneiss was replaced by a wide range of local and foreign stones, for example steatite, lapis lazuli, obsidian and carnelian. The intact tomb of Sithathoriunet held stone vessels in two separate boxes. They contained a sacred oil set of travertine, cylindrical jars and several gilded obsidian jars and a kohl pot. Royal stone vessels became particularly standardized during the Middle Kingdom, whereas further down the social hierarchy, vessel styles and sizes were much more varied.

The political instability of the Second Intermediate Period caused regional diversity in vessels between the Hyksos and Theban controlled areas. A relatively low number of shapes were made, the kohl pot being the most popular still. Heirlooms and looted artifacts substituted the lowered production quantity. Small, inscribed vessels of the Hyksos kings of the Fifteenth Dynasty exhibit the finest workmanship and materials (such as obsidian and chert). In Upper Egypt, stone vessels were more common at the time.

Egyptian-style stone vessels were a popular export to Neopalatial Minoan Crete, c. 1700 BC.

=== New Kingdom ===
At the beginning of the 18th Dynasty, cylindrical jars, kohl pots and baggy alabastra were popular stone vessel types found in many lower elite tombs. A newly developed type was the squat jar with collared neck. By the mid 18th Dynasty all three common types became rarer and the kohl pot was replaced by the kohl tube in the Amarna period. Two new forms appeared, the lentoid flask for wine and the ribbed tazza for solid cosmetics. Several burials at Thebes contained small, gilded pots made from a variety of exotic stones like diorite, hornblende and anhydrite, as well as larger serpentine and travertine jars which contained 2 litres (0.53 US gal) of ointment mixture for bodily cleansing. Inscriptions were increasingly common, including liquid measures. Handle types were inspired by jars from Cyprus and the Levant. Tuthmosis III recorded several types of vessels made of "costly stone, made according to the design of the king's own heart" on Pylon Vi of the Karnak temple.

At Amarna, stone vessels were overshadowed by the popularity of glass and faience equivalents.

Almost all stone vessels from Tutankhamun's tomb were made from travertine, perhaps due to the stone's luminescent properties. They are either smaller models, large inscribed wine and oil jars, or elaborate display vessels with gold, lapis, obsidian and glass inlays.

Gifts from foreign leaders like those of Mitannia and Babylonia list several ultrahigh value vessels, usually gilded and made from harder stones.

In the 19th Dynasty, large vessels continued to be popular. A trend towards oval and elongated forms emerged, often with incised or painted decorations.

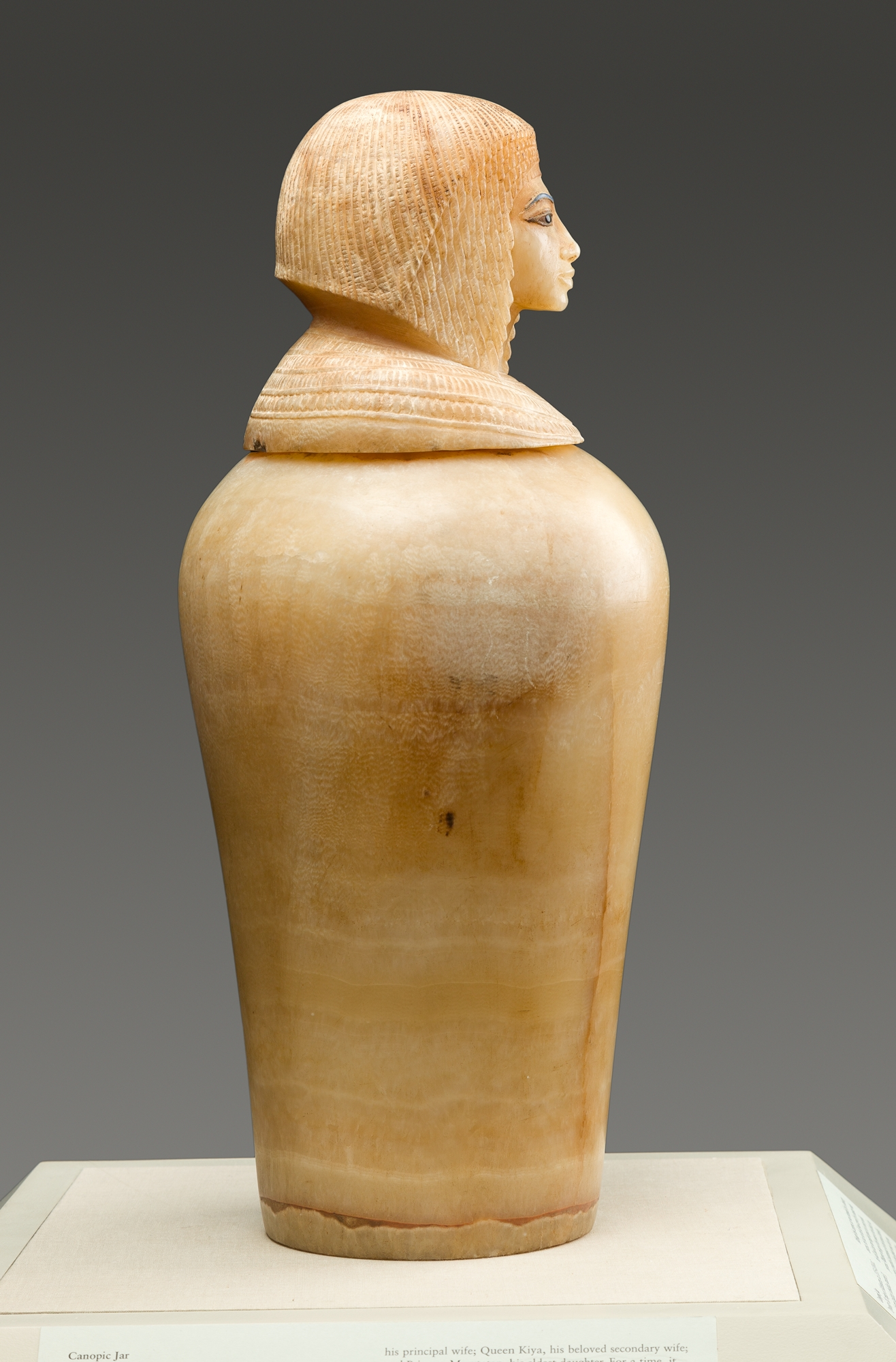
Canopic jar with a lid depicting a queen

Ribbed bowl (tazza), 18th Dynasty

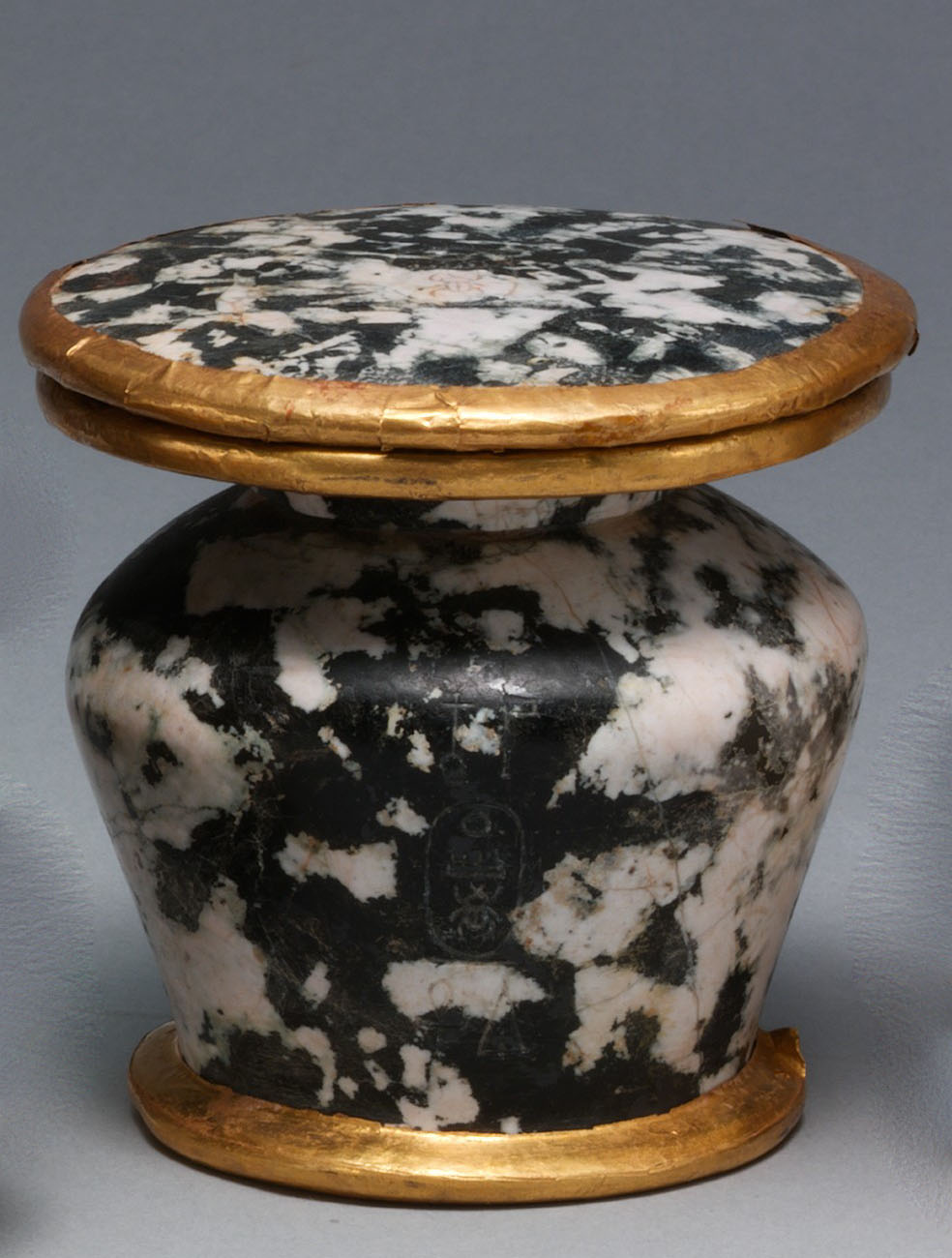
Gilded diorite kohl jar with lid

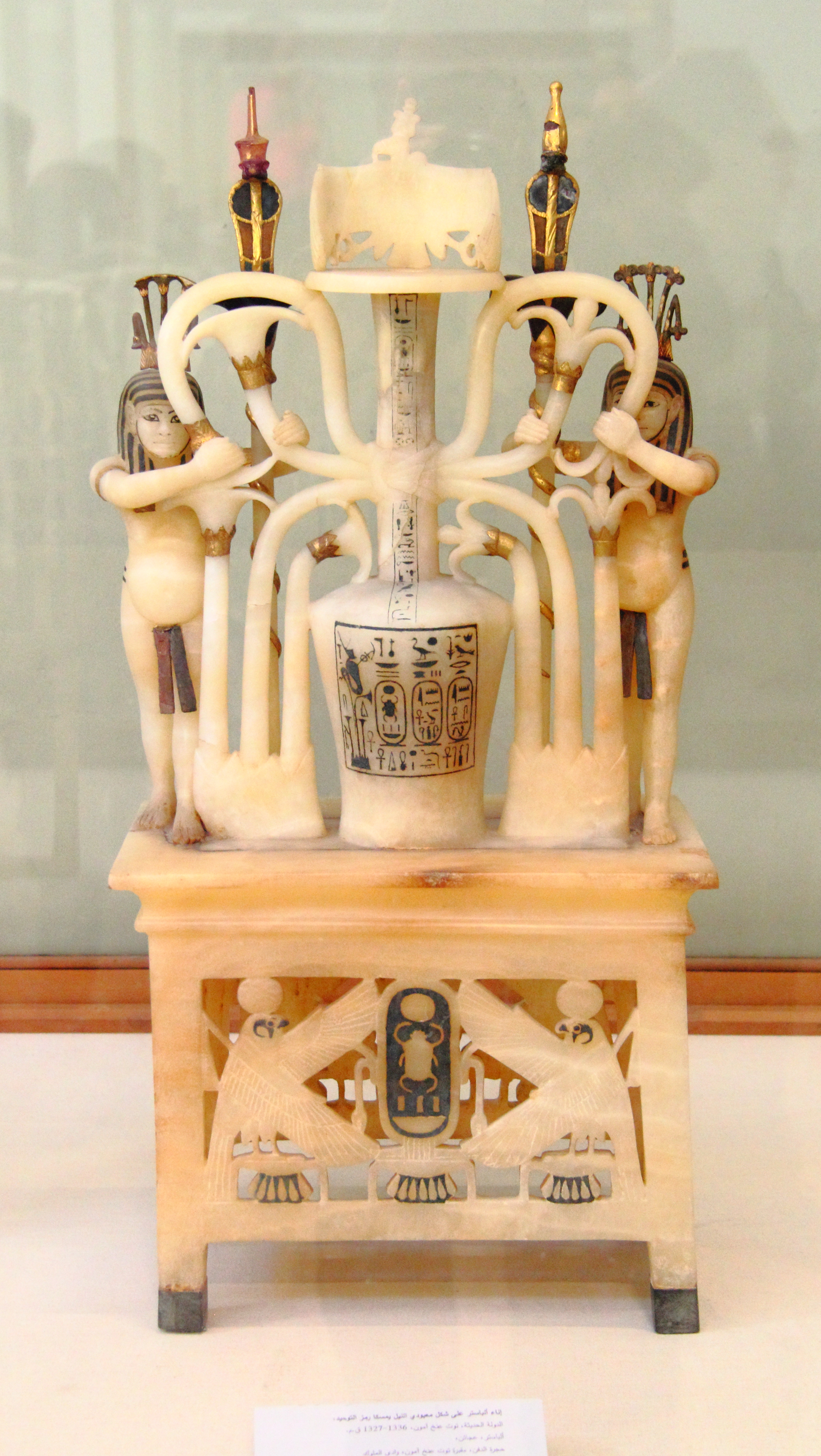
Vessel symbolizing the unification of Egypt

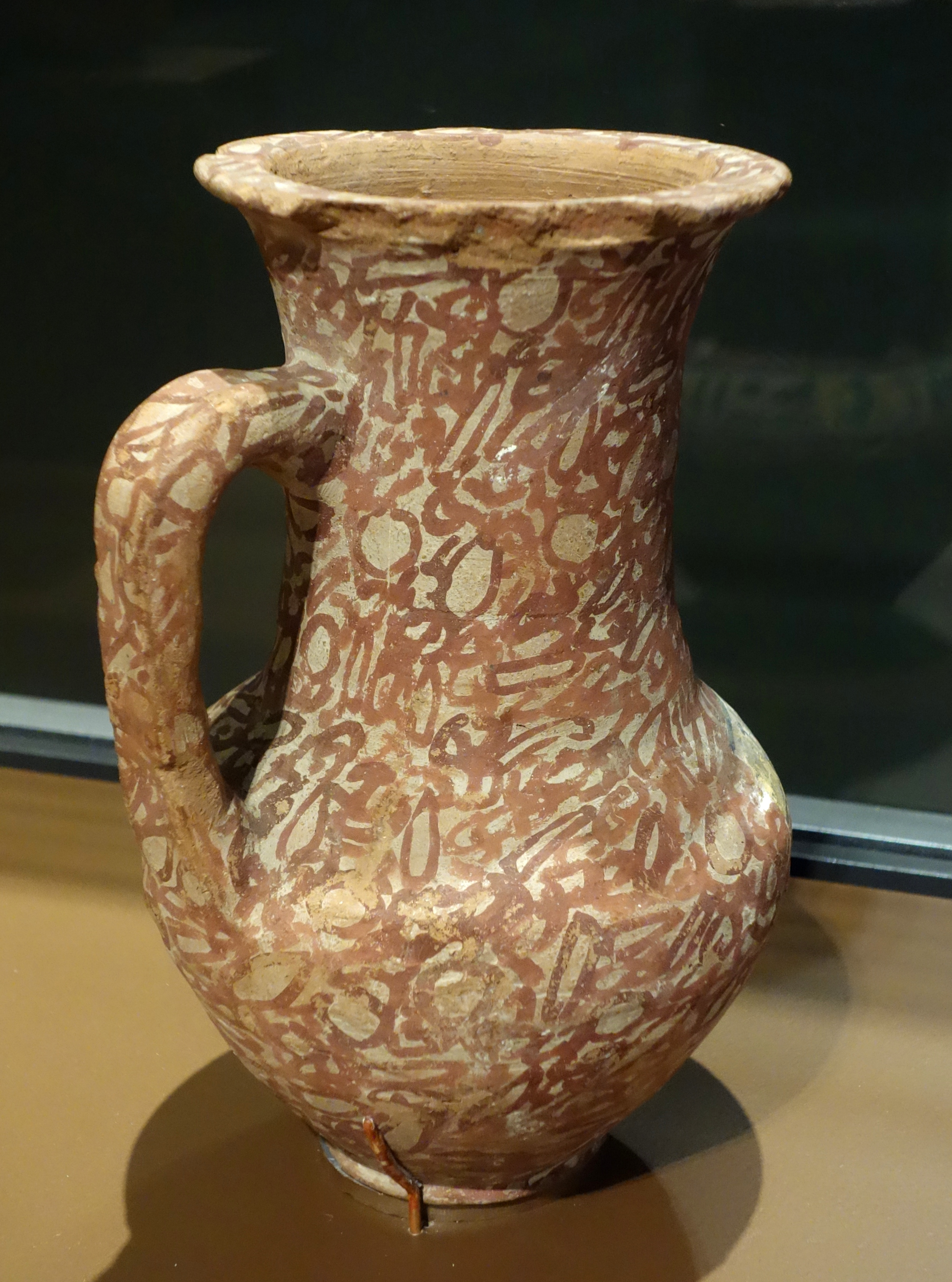
Funerary vessel of Nefer-her, painted to imitate stone

=== Third Intermediate Period to Roman Egypt ===
Stone vessel tradition continued in diminished form throughout the Third Intermediate Period and Late Period, with an increased focus on lugged shapes, but also some imitations of Early Dynastic to Old Kingdom forms. The production of Egyptian-style oil flasks collapsed at the end of the Bronze Age, only to reappear outside of Egypt from the late 8th century BC onward.

Stone vessels continued to be important in the Roman world, however never to the degree they were in the Bronze Age, perhaps due to the large variety of other vessel materials.

At Siphnos there is a kind of stone which is hollowed and turned in the lathe, for making cooking-utensils and vessels for keeping provisions; a thing too, that, to my own knowledge, is done with the green stone of Comu in Italy.

— Pliny the Elder, The Natural History of Stone, Chapter 44

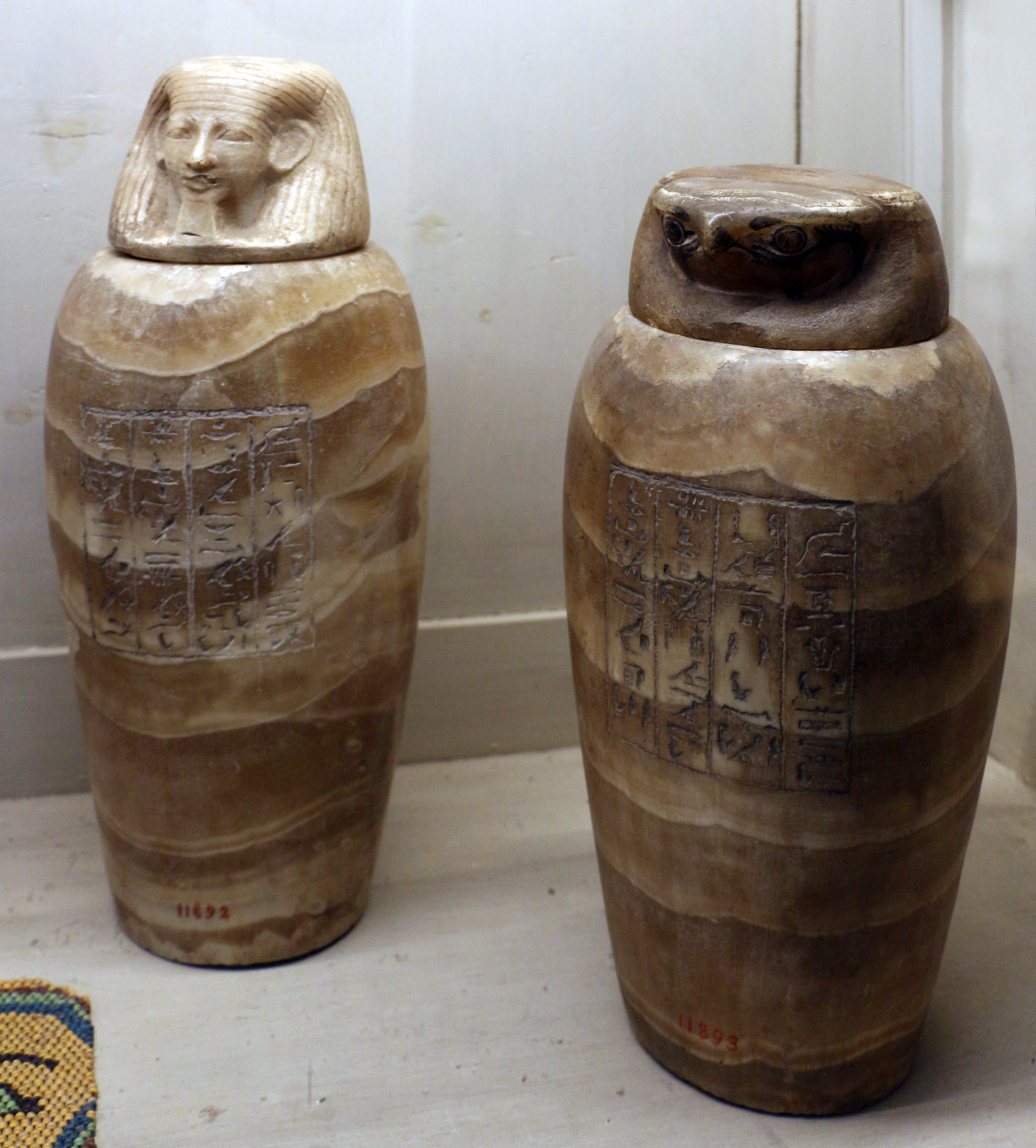
Ptolemaic canopic jars

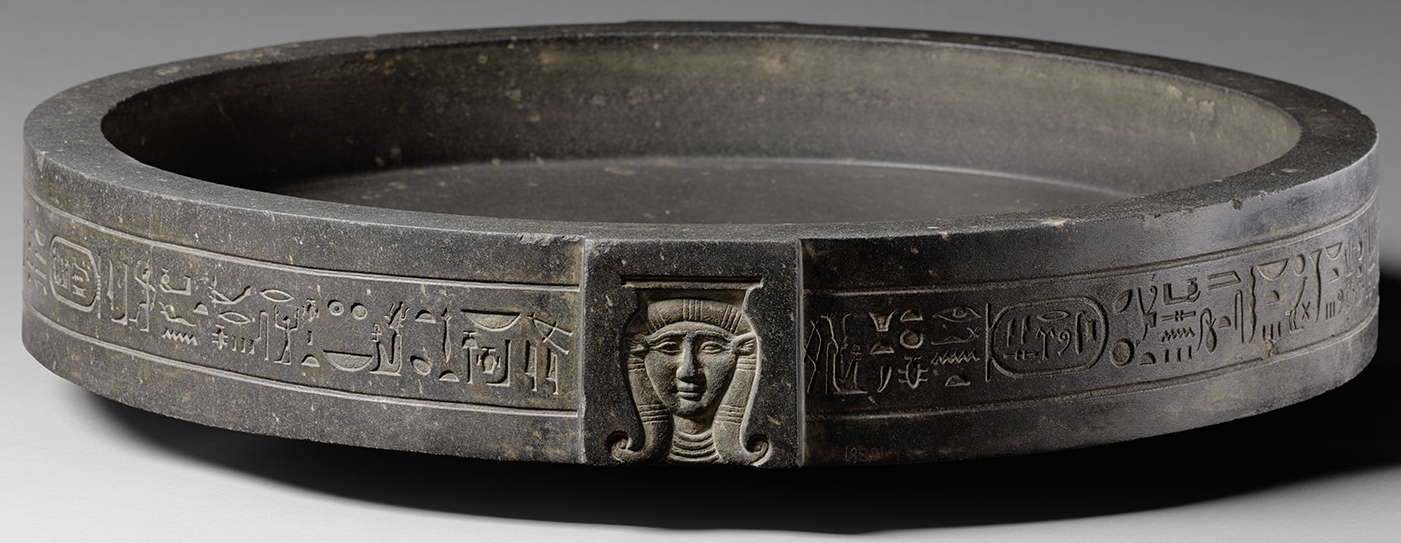
Hathor libation vessel of Ptolemy I

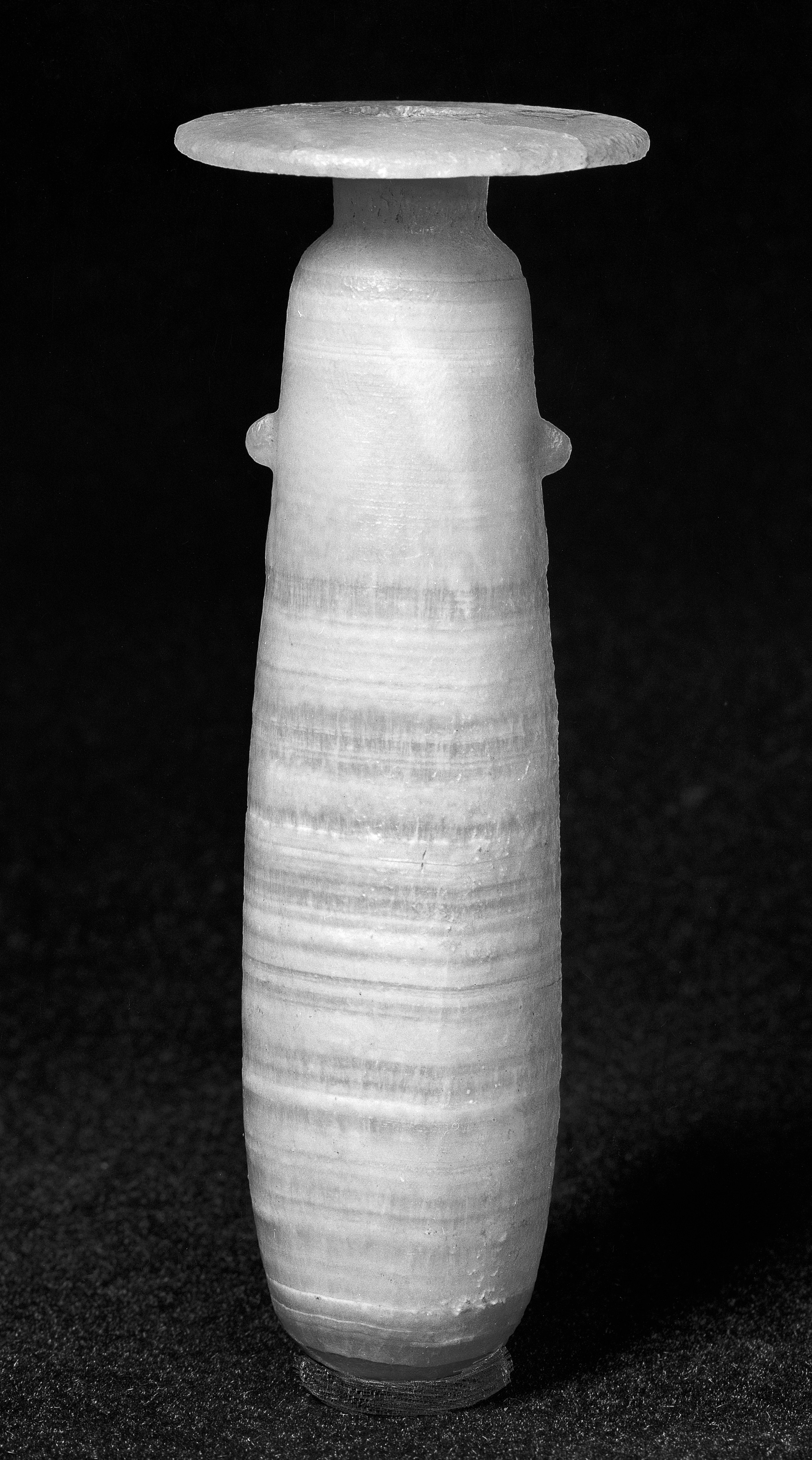
Egyptian alabastron for holding oils

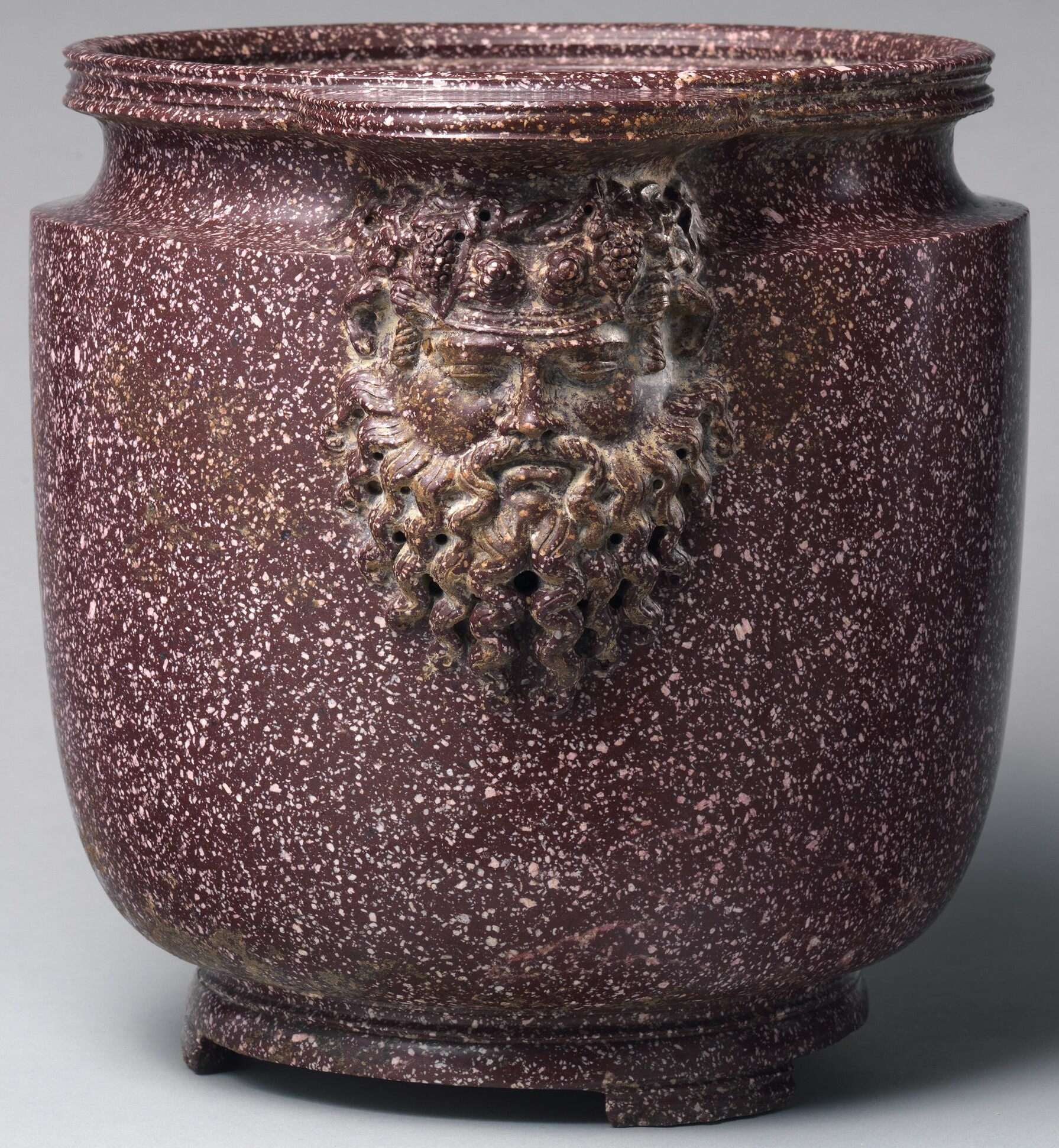
Roman era Egyptian porphyry vessel with masks of Silenus

== Forgeries ==
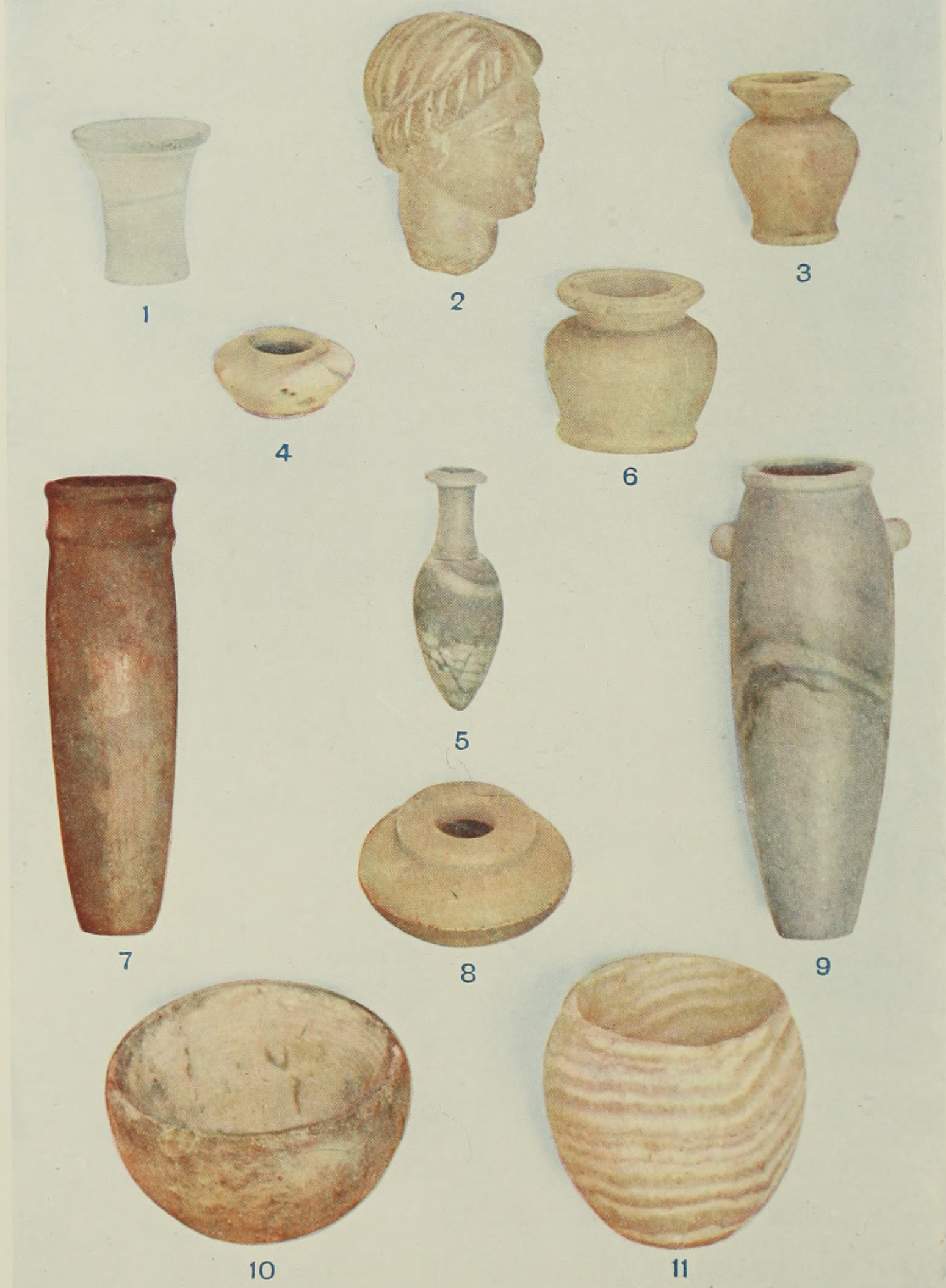
Forged travertine artifacts (before 1912): Kohl pots (1, 3, 4, 6 & 8); A head, Greek period (2); Vases (5, 7 & 9); Bowls (10 & 11)

The Egyptian antiquities market was full of forgeries as early as the mid 1800s. Danish Egyptology H.O. Lange remarked around 1900 that "half of Luxor makes a living from manufacturing fake antiquities, and the other half from selling them." They were produced primarily to deceive tourists, but also museum representatives and private collectors.

Egyptian forgeries fall into four main categories:

1. Skilled copies or adaptations of well-known artifacts of very fine craftsmanship, usually made in Paris or Egypt in the 20th century
2. Partial forgeries made by improving mediocre or incomplete originals, produced since the beginning of the 19th century
3. Forgeries for tourists, usually small in size and of low quality, made almost exclusively in Egypt
4. Fine replicas made honestly for decorative purposes, which were later sold as originals either by accident or design. These were mostly made in France in the 19th century.

In 1906, Ludwig Borchardt mentioned in his forgery report to the dictionary-commission that two Copts from Qena had switched from working on hard stone vessel to creating fake reliefs, due to the increased demand for those objects.

Around 1910, T.G. Wakeling came across four magnificent and beautifully-made large granite bowls in a shop at Luxor, which were sold for E£250 each (the value of 65.6 oz of gold or 2 acres (87,000 sq ft) of ground at the time). Since they had clean cut edges and lacked the small irregularities of old works, he thought them to be the work of Italian sculptors, as many of them were employed to work granite at the barrage at Aswan and were highly skilled in the art of working harder stones. He passed on buying them, because of their questionable genuineness. When he returned the following year, all of them had been sold, but the dealer had three additional ones to offer. Wakeling portended that some of these forged vessels might end up in a museum or private collection.

Sometimes forgers would use wax to combine several genuine granite vessel fragments to a complete one, which was then sold for E£10–20 (worth 2.6–5.3 oz of gold). Wakeling recalls that a museum had displayed several of these for years until they started to fall apart due to the wax crumbling.

Somewhere in Egypt they are making stone vessels of all periods, apparently on a steam lathe, but copying the ancient forms with great success.

— T.G. Wakeling, Forged Egyptian antiquities (1912)

A law passed in 1912 restricted the export of antiquities out of Egypt. The resulting decline of available genuine artifacts helped the forgery market to flourish. Different regions specialized in creation of different kinds of objects and the manufacturing techniques became increasingly sophisticated. Convincing fakes were made by studying real artifacts or scholarly publications containing illustrations of such.

Steindorff and Rosenthal published an article on forged Egyptian antiquities in 1947, in which they make note of the great progress that had been made in the fabrication of sculptures of limestone, sandstone and even granite.

These fakes have gradually become so perfect that they constitute a great danger for museums and collectors.

— George Steindorff and Gertrude Rosenthal, Fakes and fates of Egyptian antiquities (1947)

== Materials ==
Time range of stones used for vessels
Material	Mohs Hard.	Pre Dyn	Naq III	Dynasty				FIP	MK	SIP	NK	TIP	LP+
Material	Mohs Hard.	Pre Dyn	Naq III	1-2	3	4	5-6	FIP	MK	SIP	NK	TIP	LP+
Andesite porphyry C	7	✔											
Black and grey shelly limestone	3-4	✔											
Mica schist	2.5-4	✔	✔	✔									
Green serpentine	2.5-4	✔	✔	✔									
Granodiorite	6-7	✔	✔	✔	✔								
Andesite porphyry B	7	✔	✔	✔	✔								
Pink and yellow limestone	3-4	✔	✔	✔	✔								
Hornblende diorite B and C	6-7	✔	✔	✔	✔	✔							
Red/pink limestone	3-4	✔	✔	✔				✔					
Hornblende diorite A	6-7	✔	✔	✔	✔	✔	✔		✔				
Siltstone	6-7	✔	✔	✔					✔				✔
Yellow limestone with black veins	3-4	✔	✔	✔	✔	✔	✔	✔	✔				
Grey limestone	3-4	✔	✔	✔	✔					✔	✔		
Serpentine with black veins	2.5-3	✔	✔	✔	✔	✔	✔	✔	✔	✔	✔		
Red and white limestone breccia	3-4/7	✔	✔	✔	✔	✔	✔	✔	✔	✔	✔		
Alabaster	2	✔	✔	✔	✔						✔		✔
Basalt	6-7	✔	✔	✔	✔	✔	✔				✔		✔
Yellow limestone	3-4	✔	✔	✔	✔	✔	✔	✔	✔	✔	✔	✔	
Travertine (Egyptian alabaster)	3	✔	✔	✔	✔	✔	✔	✔	✔	✔	✔	✔	✔
Andersite porphyry A	7		✔	✔									
Amethyst	7		✔	✔									
Malachite	3.5-4		✔	✔									
Purple-striped tuff	4-6		✔	✔									
Granite	6-7		✔	✔	✔	✔							
Quartz crystal	7		✔	✔			✔						
Lapis lazuli	5-5.5		✔	✔					✔				
Diorite gneiss	6-7		✔	✔	✔	✔	✔				✔		
Green tuff	4-6			✔									
Dolomite	3.5-4			✔	✔								
Rose quartz	6-7			✔		✔							
Meta. and porph./ amphibolite	7			✔		✔							
Carnelian	7			✔					✔				
Obsidian	5-5.5			✔	✔	✔	✔	✔	✔	✔	✔		
Quartzite	6-7			✔									✔
Andesite porphyry D	7			✔									✔
Gabbro	6-7					✔							
Marble	3					✔							
Anhydrite	3-3.5								✔	✔			
Hematite	5.5-6.5								✔	✔			
Steatite	1								✔		✔		
Granular black serpentine	2.5-3								✔				✔
Agate	6.5-7											✔	✔
Material	Mohs Hard.	Pre Dyn	Naq III	Dynasty				FIP	MK	SIP	NK	TIP	LP+
Material	Mohs Hard.	Pre Dyn	Naq III	1-2	3	4	5-6	FIP	MK	SIP	NK	TIP	LP+

=== Alternative materials to stone ===
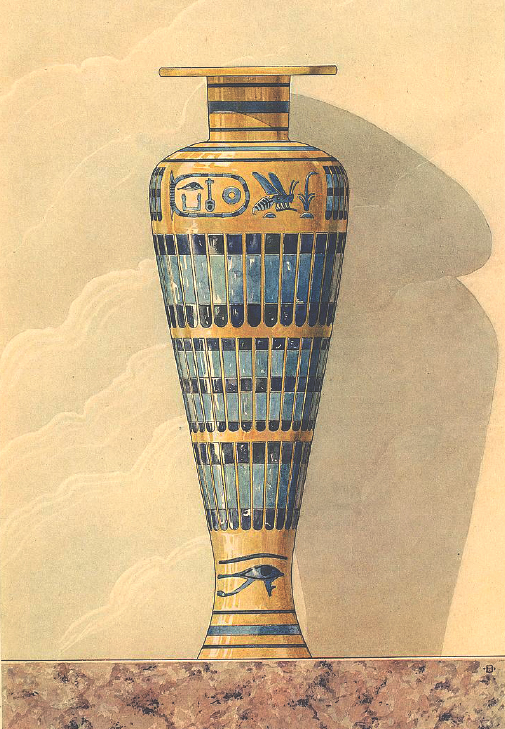
5th Dynasty wooden funerary vase, gilded, with faience inlays

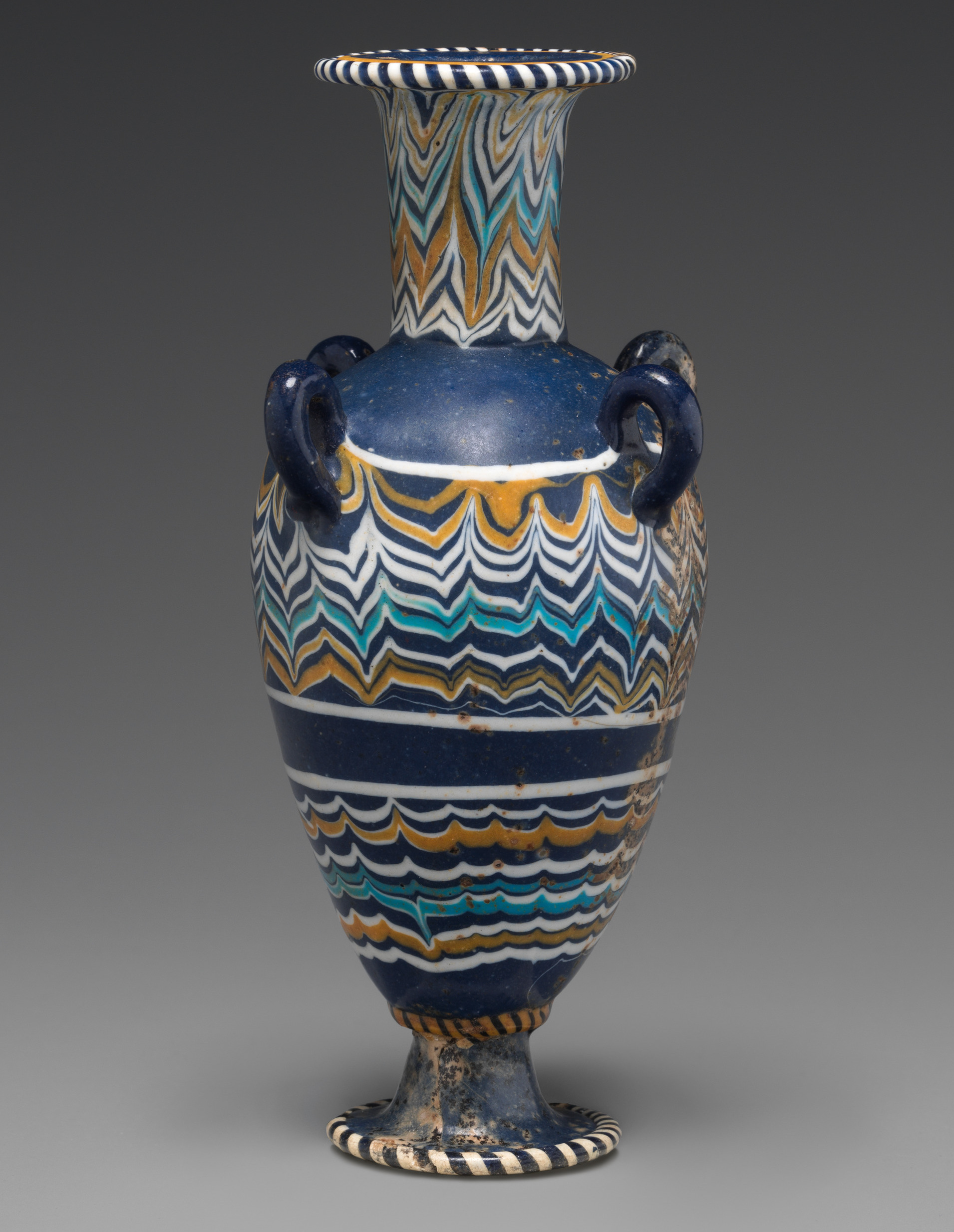
Amphora-shaped glass perfume bottle, New Kingdom

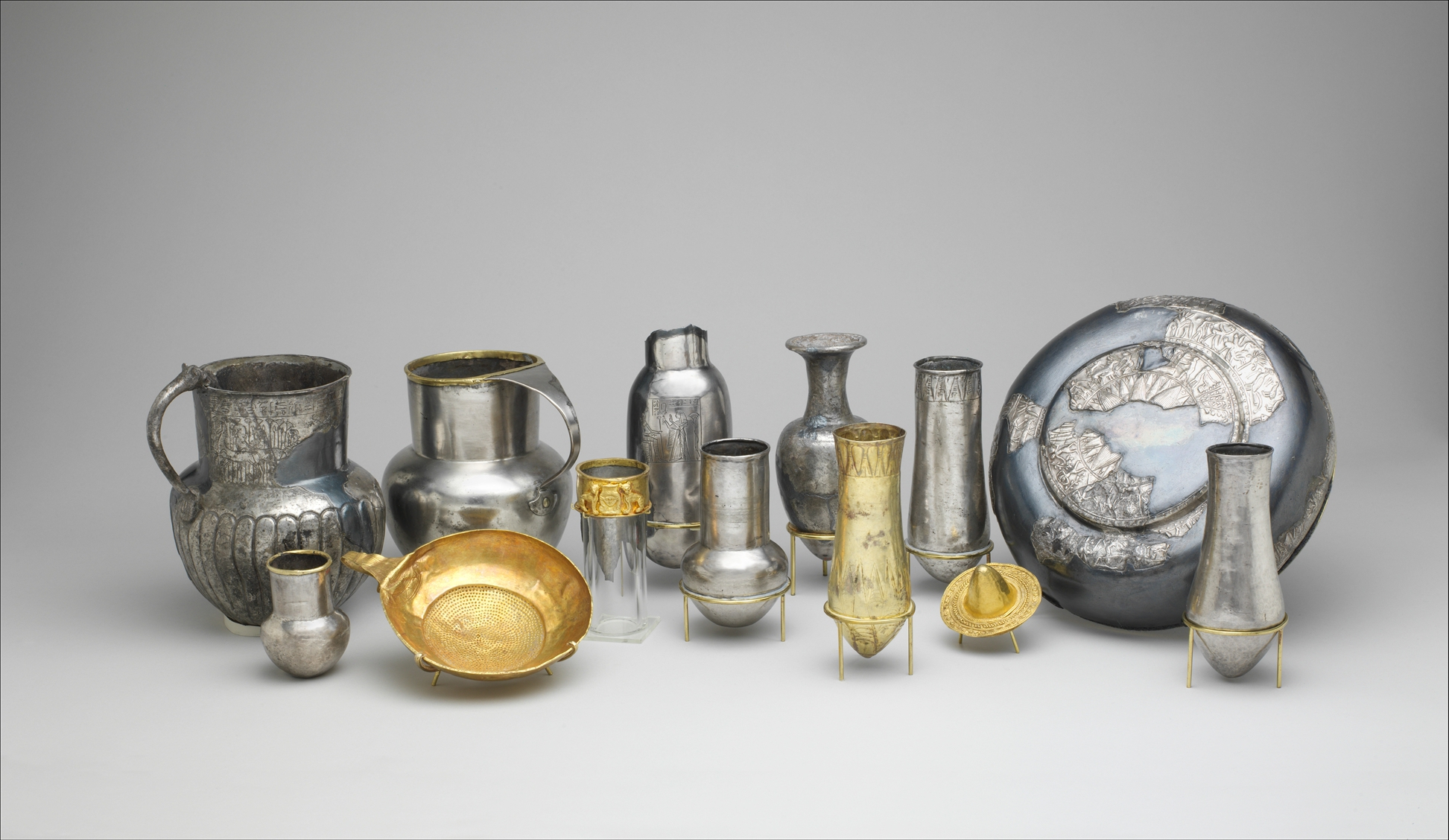
Precious metal vessels from Bubastis, New Kingdom

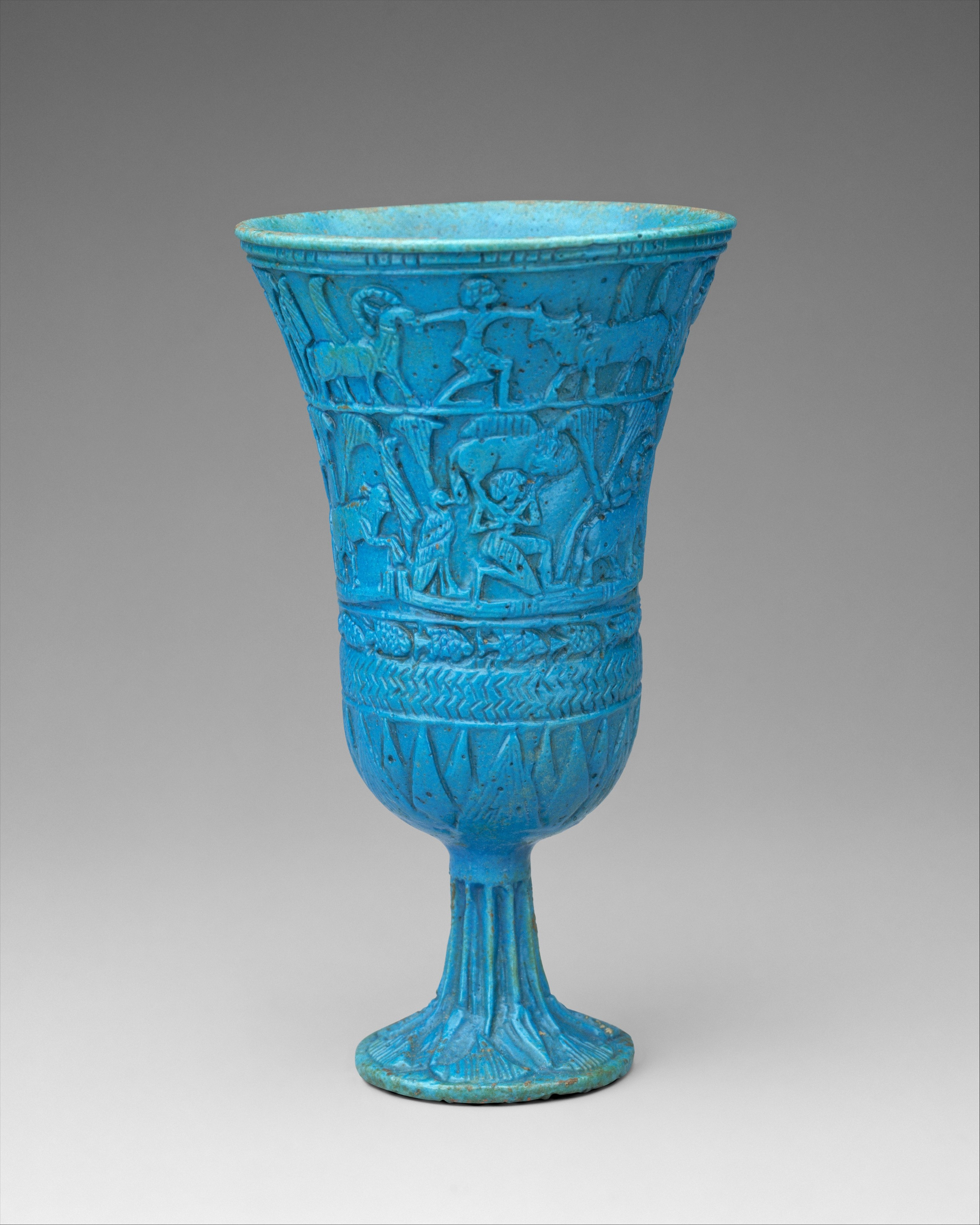
Egyptian faience lotiform chalice, Third Intermediate Period

== See also ==
- Ancient Egyptian technology
- Stone vessels in ancient Judaea
- Water clock
