= Gertrude Rosenthal =

American art historian

Gertrude Rosenthal (1903-1989) was an art historian who served as the chief curator of the Baltimore Museum of Art.

== Early years ==
Gertrude Rosenthal was born in Mayen, German Empire in 1903. In 1923, she received her baccalaureate, but with the financial strife that beset Germany in the wake of World War I, Rosenthal was unable to advance directly to university. She obtained a job in the bookstore Kolnische Zeiting where she read many volumes about art history which fostered her interest and expertise in the subject until she had the funds to enroll in the University of Cologne. Rosenthal also wrote a column in the newspaper about art, dance, theater, and books. In 1931, Gertrude Rosenthal earned her PhD, writing her dissertation about 17th and 18th century Scottish, Italian, and French painters. Although she wanted to study Antoine Watteau in France, her professor did not let her; thus, she went to Rome to study French sculpture of the High Baroque period instead. Eventually, Rosenthal travelled to Avignon and studied at the Sorbonne (building) in Paris.

== 1930s ==
The rise of Adolf Hitler to power in 1933 impacted the life and career of Gertrude Rosenthal. Due to the Press Law, it became unsafe for her to sign her names to her articles so she had a friend sign them for three months. Worried about putting others in danger, Rosenthal stopped submitting her writing altogether. For the next five years, she devoted most of her time to tending to her sick mother, yet she also served as the co-manager of the Society of Arts and Letters that organized cultural events employing actors, musicians, and scholars who were either Jewish or associated with Jews. Then in 1938, after the death of her mother, Gertrude Rosenthal left Germany for England with three dollars and a permit to work as a domestic servant. She went to the Courtauld Institute of Art of the University of London to ask if her permit could be changed. Although the administration denied her request to change her permit so she could obtain employment at the Institute, the chief librarian, Lady Rḥoda Welsford overlooked the official verdict and gave Rosenthal the job. Rosenthal later remarked that the incident let her know what it meant to be free and regarded it as the greatest moment of her life.

== United States ==
In 1940, Gertrude Rosenthal immigrated to the United States and became the art librarian at Goucher College where she built up the slide collection. Rosenthal left Goucher in 1945, the same year she received her American citizenship, to become the Director of Research at the Baltimore Museum of Art (BMA). She then went on to serve as general curator and ultimately senior curator of the museum. Throughout her tenure at the BMA, Rosenthal was known for organizing scholarly exhibitions that had popular appeal such as “The Age of Elegance: The Rococo and its Effects” in 1959 and “From El Greco to Pollack” in 1968. She was also instrumental in getting collectors to donate their art to the institution and played a significant role along with the museum director at the time, Adelyn Dohme Breeskin in securing the Cone collection. After her retirement in 1969, Rosenthal continued to retain ties with the BMA until her death in 1989.

== Honors ==
Gertrude Rosenthal held honorary doctorates from Goucher and the Maryland Institute College of Art and was a senior fellow of the National Endowment for the Arts. She was also a visiting lecturer at Johns Hopkins University.
