= Rehuerdjersen =

- Treasurer of Egypt
Egyptian name
A1 A1 A1 r Dr r s n
- Pharaoh: Amenemhat I
- Burial: Giza, Egypt

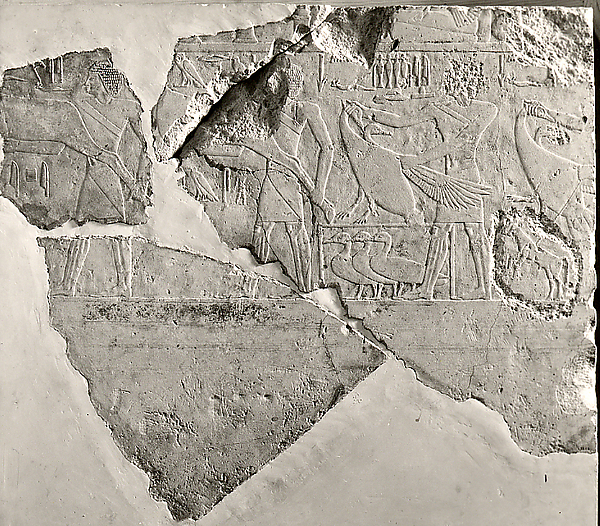
Relief from Rehuerdjersen's mastaba, now at the Metropolitan Museum of Art

Rehuerdjersen was an ancient Egyptian treasurer who held this office under the 12th Dynasty king Amenemhat I.

Rehuerdjersen is mainly known from his tomb at Lisht (tomb no. 384), close to the pyramid of Amenemhat I. His mastaba was heavily damaged, but reliefs with his name and several titles were found. From the position of the mastaba it has been argued that Rehuerdjersen and Amenemhat I were contemporaries. In his tomb a number of important titles are preserved: royal sealer, sole friend, spokesman of every Pe-ite, controller of every kilt and overseer of the double gold house On a stela he also has the title member of the elite, foremost of action (Haty-a) and Overseer of the treasuries.

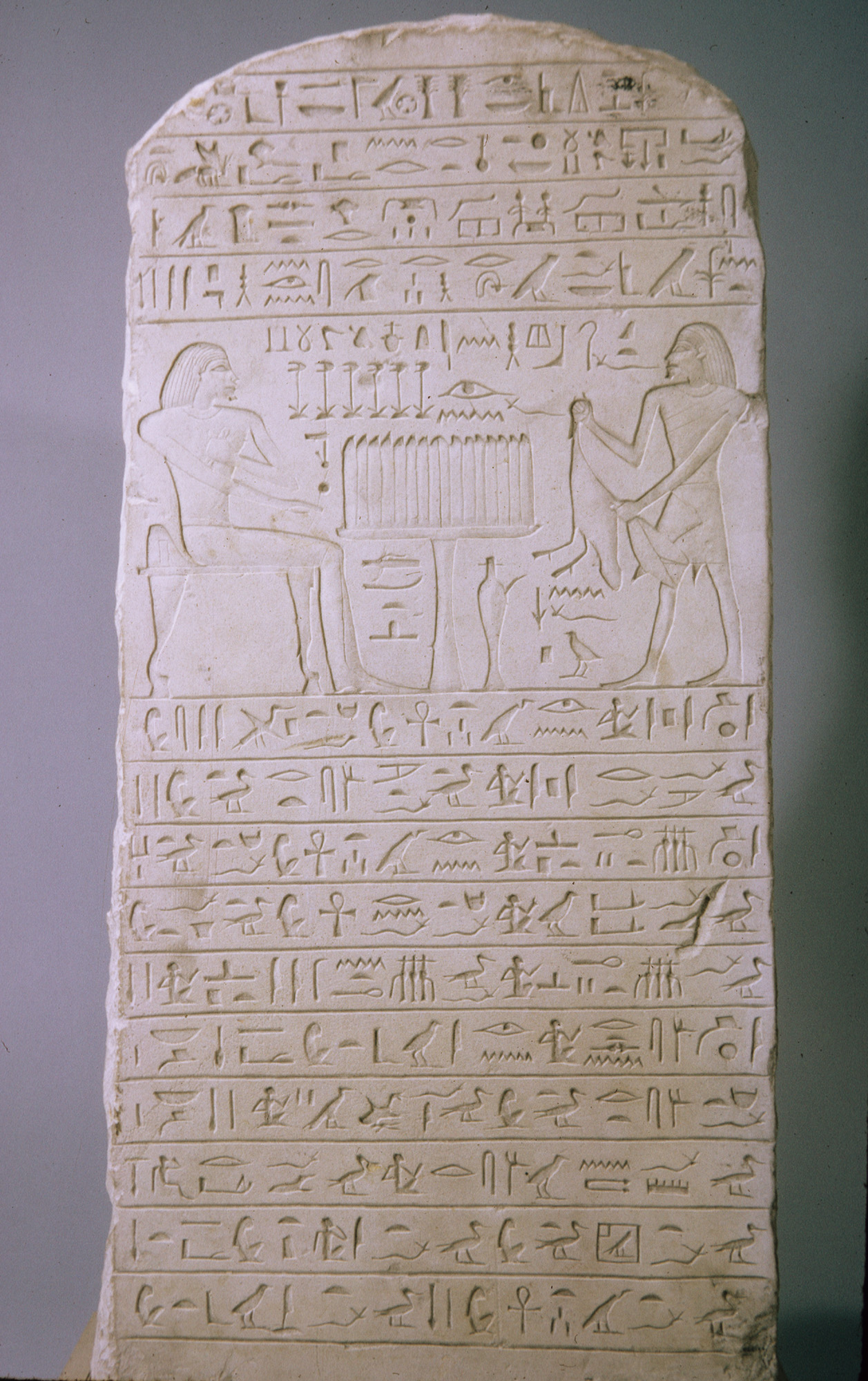
Stela of Rehuerdjersen, now at the Metropolitan Museum of Art

The mastaba lies on the west side of the king's pyramid, that is behind the pyramid. It was already excavated in 1894–1895 by a French expedition under Joseph Étienne Gautier and then again in 1920–1921 by an American expedition. It consisted of a mastaba proper and a wall around it. The enclosure wall is 27.7 meters long to the north-south and 19 meters to the east-west. The mastaba proper is solid building was an inner cult chamber. Some parts of the decoration are still preserved in the cult chamber. One block shows a row of offering bearers. Other blocks of the decoration were found nearby. They show Rehuerdjersen sitting on a chair with an inscription in front of him, providing his titles. Another block shows boats in the marshes.

Rehuerdjersen is also known from an Abydos stela. However, based on stylistically reasons the stela was dated to the rule of Amenemhat II. The two different datings created some confusion over the dating of Rehuerdjersen. It seems possible that the tomb was built much later than when Amenemhat I was king, but the style of the reliefs in the mastaba seem to confirm an early date. Therefore it had been argued that either there were two treasurers with the same name or that the stela was set up after his death.

== Literature ==
- Dieter Arnold: Middle Kingdom Tomb Architecture at Lisht, New York 2008, pp. 63–69, plates 115–128, ISBN 978-1-58839-194-0
