= Intefiqer =

Egyptian noble

Inteqifer
- Vizier of Egypt; Overseer of the city
Egyptian name
ini&n t f i q r Y1V
- Predecessor: Ipi
- Successor: Senusret
- Dynasty: 12th Dynasty
- Pharaoh: Amenemhat I, Senusret I
- Burial: Mastaba at el-Lisht
- Mother: Senet

Intefiqer (also Antefoker of Intefoker; ỉnỉ-ỉt.f ỉqr) was an ancient Egyptian high official with the titles overseer of the city and Vizier under king Amenemhet I and his son Senusret I, during the early 12th Dynasty.

== Attestations ==
In Lower Nubia, Intefiqer (PD 146) is known from several rock inscriptions, showing that he was part of a military mission into this region. He appears in an inscription found at the Red Sea coast and in the so-called Reisner Papyrus. Two rock inscriptions in Lower Nubia mention him. They seem to indicate that he was involved in a military campaign into this region. The inscriptions are not dated, but other inscriptions in the region seem to indicate a military campaign in year 29 of Amenemhet I, which corresponds to the 9th year of Senusret I.

At Wadi el-Hudi, Intefiqer is known from a stela dated to a year 20, reporting the bringing of amethyst.

At Thebes, the Tomb of Senet (TT60), that of his mother Senet is located in Sheikh Abd el-Qurna in the Theban Necropolis, opposite Luxor.

== Burial ==
At Lisht, Intefiqer was buried in a mastaba next to the Pyramid of Amenemhet I.

== Bibliography ==
- Norman de Garis Davies: The tomb of Antefoker, vizier of Sesostris I, and of his wife, Senet (no. 60), London 1920
- Wolfram Grajetzki: Court Officials of the Egyptian Middle Kingdom, London 2009 p. 27-30 ISBN 978-0-7156-3745-6
- William Kelly Simpson: Rulers and Administrators - Dynasty 12, The Rule of the House of Itj-towy with Some Personal Reminiscenes, In: D. P. Silverman, W. K. Simpson, J. Wegner (Hrsg.): Archaism and Innovation: Studies in the Culture of Middle Kingdom Egypt, New Haven, Philadelphia 2009 S. 269-97 ISBN 978-0-9802065-1-7
