= Nakht (disambiguation) =

Nakht was an ancient Egyptian official during the 18th Dynasty.

Nakht or Nakhti is the name of several ancient Egyptian officials:

- Nakht (high steward) during the 12th Dynasty
- Nakht (BH21), nomarch during the 12th Dynasty
- Nakhtpaaten, vizier during the 18th Dynasty, sometimes shortened to "Nakht"
