= Itjtawy =

City in Ancient Egypt

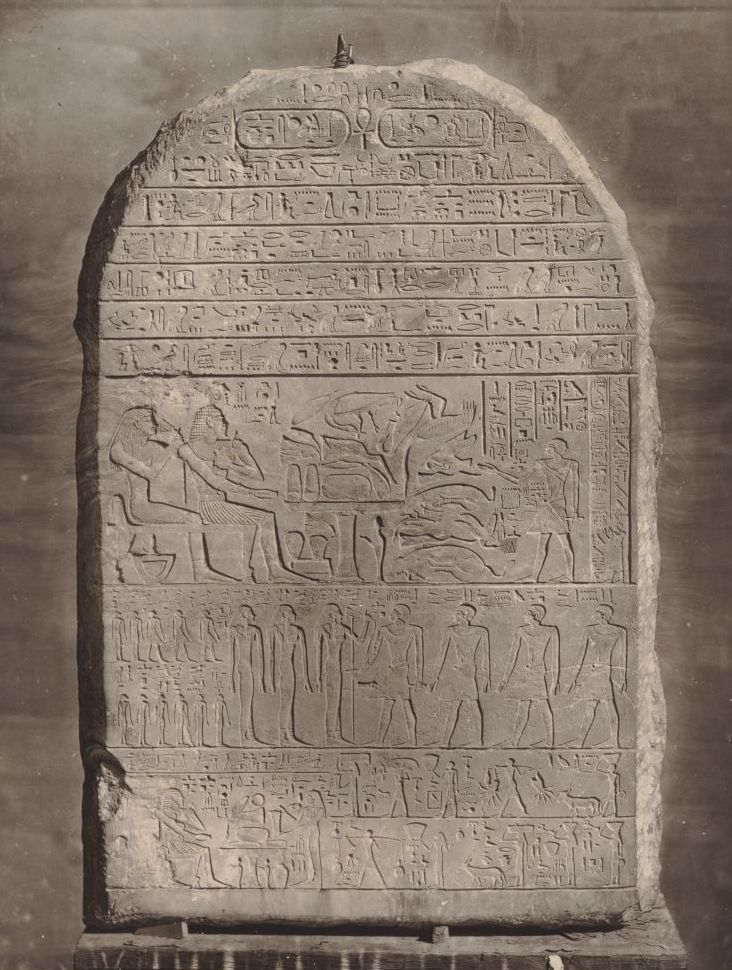
- The stela Cairo CG 20516, dated to Amenemhat I's regnal year 30, contains the earliest known mention of Itjtawy
- Interactive map of Itjtawy
- 29°34′13″N 31°13′52″E
- Location: Faiyum Governorate, Egypt

Itjtawy or It-Towy ("Seizer of the Two Lands"), also known by its full name Amenemhat-itjtawy ("Amenemhat seizes the Two Lands"), was an ancient Egyptian royal city established by pharaoh Amenemhat I.

As yet, Itjtawy's exact location remains unidentified. Circumstantial evidence suggests that the site lies beneath cultivated fields east of the pyramids of Amenemhat I and Senusret I at Lisht.

There is evidence that Amenemhat, the founder of the 12th Dynasty who ruled approximately 1991 to 1962 BC, established Itjtawy during his regnal year 20, replacing Thebes as the capital of Egypt. However, the earliest known mention of Itjtawy is dated to the pharaoh's regnal year 30 (ten years later than its presumed foundation), and is represented by the double-dated stela CG 20516 now in Cairo Museum.

Relocation of the capital may have been a strategic move. The site for Itjtawy – hundreds of miles down the Nile from Thebes – may have been chosen for its proximity to the source of Asiatic incursions into Egypt, in order to help prevent further attacks.

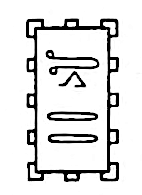
The name of Itjtawy as it appears on the aforementioned stele, surrounded by a fortified enclosure

Since the determinative sign for Itjtawy is that of a fortified enclosure instead of the conventional city hieroglyph, Egyptologist Steven Snape suggested that Itjtawy was a "disembedded capital", a small center comprising administrative buildings and a royal residence, inhabited only by the administrative staff who ran those buildings; the major economic and cultural centers remained pre-existing cities such as Memphis and Thebes.

Itjtawy retained its capital status during the 12th and 13th dynasties at least until the rule of Merneferre Ay, the last pharaoh of the period who is attested by objects from outside of Upper Egypt. It is believed that at this point the invasion of Lower Egypt by populations from Canaan occurred, which led to the fall of the Middle Kingdom into the Second Intermediate Period; the pharaohs of the 13th Dynasty thus abandoned Itjtawy and retreated back to Thebes in the south.

== See also ==
- List of ancient Egyptian towns and cities

Preceded by Thebes	Historical capital of Egypt; 1985–1700 BC	Succeeded by Thebes; Avaris
