= Sesenebnef =

Sesenebnef was an ancient Egyptian chief lector priest of the Thirteenth Dynasty, around 1750 BC. He is mainly known from his tomb at Lisht, which was excavated around 1900. The tomb was found looted but still contained the remains of two wooden coffins, one placed inside the other. The remains of the coffins were found in a poor state of preservation. Therefore, the inscriptions on the coffin were copied and the coffins were left on the site. These texts belong to the longest religious texts of the late Middle Kingdom of Ancient Egypt. Many spells on the coffins are only known from the Book of the Dead which dates several hundred years later.

== Literature ==
- MM.J.-E. Gautier, G. Jéquier: Mémoire sur les Fouilles de Licht (Cairo, 1902), p. 74-77, plates XVI-XXV
