= Senusret (vizier) =

Ancient Egyptian official

- Vizier of Egypt
- Tenure: c. 1925 BC
- Pharaoh: Amenemhat I Senusret I

Senusret (fl. c. 1925 BC) was an Ancient Egyptian official who was a vizier during the last years of king Senusret I's rule and in the first years of Amenemhat II. Senusret is known from a stela found in Abydos, which is dated to year 8 of Amenemhat II. He also appears in biographical inscriptions in the tomb of the governor Amenemhat at Beni Hasan, where it is stated that he was on a mission to Koptos. The inscription reports events under Senusret I.

Senusret had a huge tomb complex next to the pyramid of Amenemhat I at Lisht. There was a mastaba in the centre, about 12 m × 26 m in size, much of which has been destroyed. The building was found within an outer wall made of mudbricks, measuring 30.4 m × 35.8 m. The decoration of the mastaba was only preserved in the smallest fragments, but revealed the name Senusret and some titles, including those of a vizier. Within the tomb complex was found the undisturbed burial shaft of the lady Senebtisi.

== Literature ==
- James P. Allen: The high officials of the early Middle Kingdom. In: N. Strudwick, J. Taylor (Hrsg.): The Theban Necropolis. London 2003, p. 25
- Dieter Arnold: Middle Kingdom Tomb Architecture at Lisht. New York 2008, p. 77–82, pls. 146b, 147–158, ISBN 978-1-58839-194-0
