= Nakht (high steward) =

Ancient Egyptian high steward

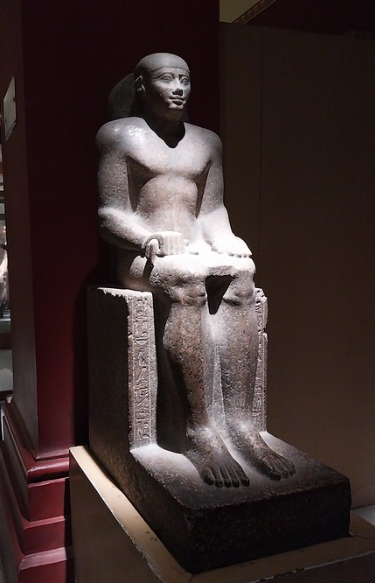
- Statue of Nakht from his tomb
- Tenure: c. 1950 BC
- Burial: Giza, Egypt

Nakht (fl. c. 1950 BC) was an ancient Egyptian official who lived under king Senusret I in the 12th Dynasty. His main title was high steward. As high steward, he was responsible for the domains providing the palace and the royal residence with food and other resources.

Nakht is known from several sources. He was buried in Lisht near the Pyramid of Amenemhet I where his relief decorated tomb excavated from 1894–1895 and again from 1913–1914. The tomb has a chapel (about 6.7 × 11.9 m), that was decorated with reliefs. Only few fragments of the relief decoration survived. Here was also found a life size statue that is now in the Egyptian Museum in Cairo. A second statue without provenance is today in Naples (National Archaeological Museum, Naples). He is also named on a control mark on one block at the pyramid of Senusret I at Lisht. The control mark is not dated but was found at a part of the building that was built in the second decade of the king's reign, providing a rough dating for Nakht.
