= Abetni =

Abetni was an ancient Egyptian queen of the Thirteenth Dynasty. She is only known from one stela found at Lisht in pit 412, where there was also found the stela of the king's son Hepu. The latter appears also on the stela of Abetni. She was most likely his mother. Her royal husband is unknown. The stela is today in the Lowe Art Museum (inventory no. 58.105.002).
