= Senebtisi =

Ancient Egyptian woman

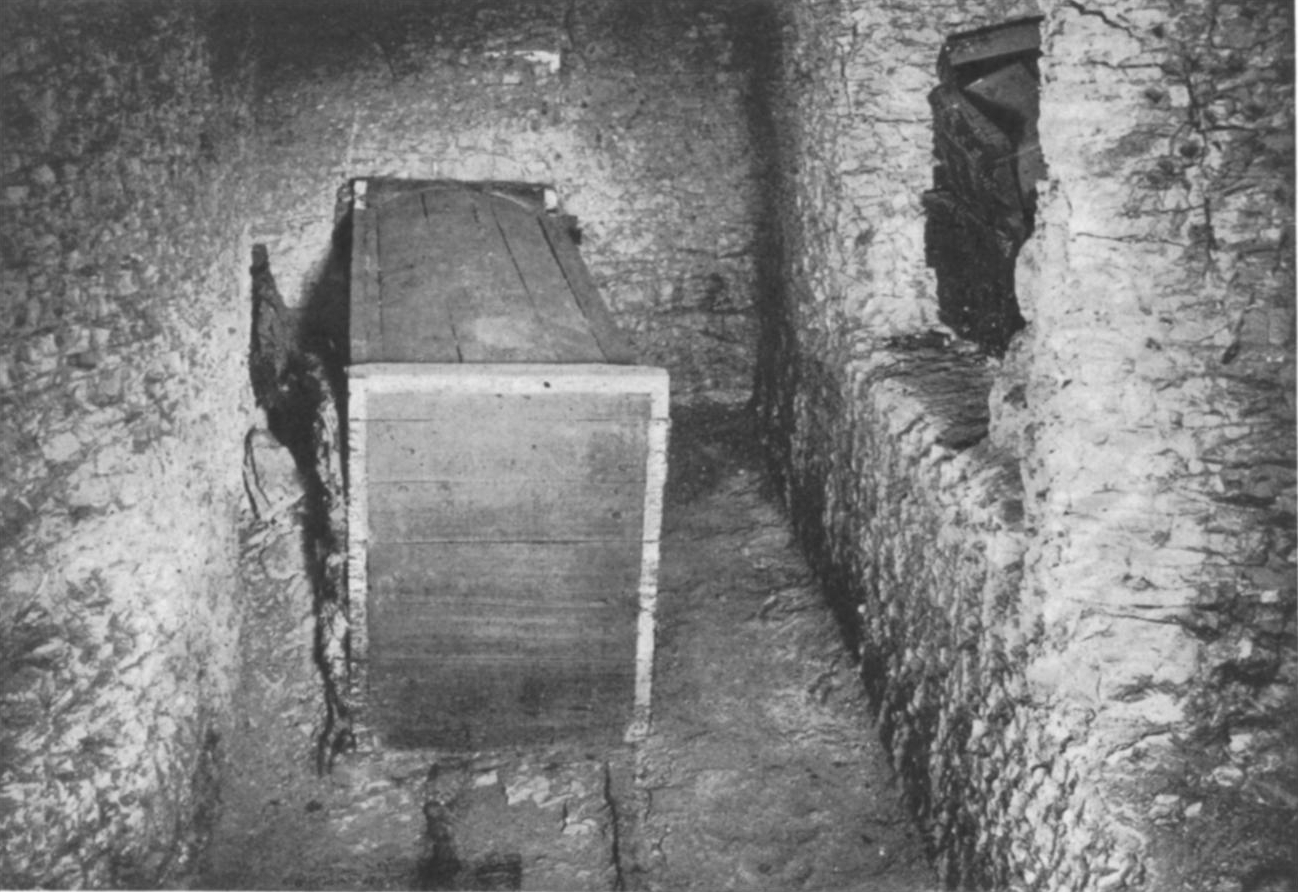
The middle coffin of Senebtisi as found in her tomb in 1907

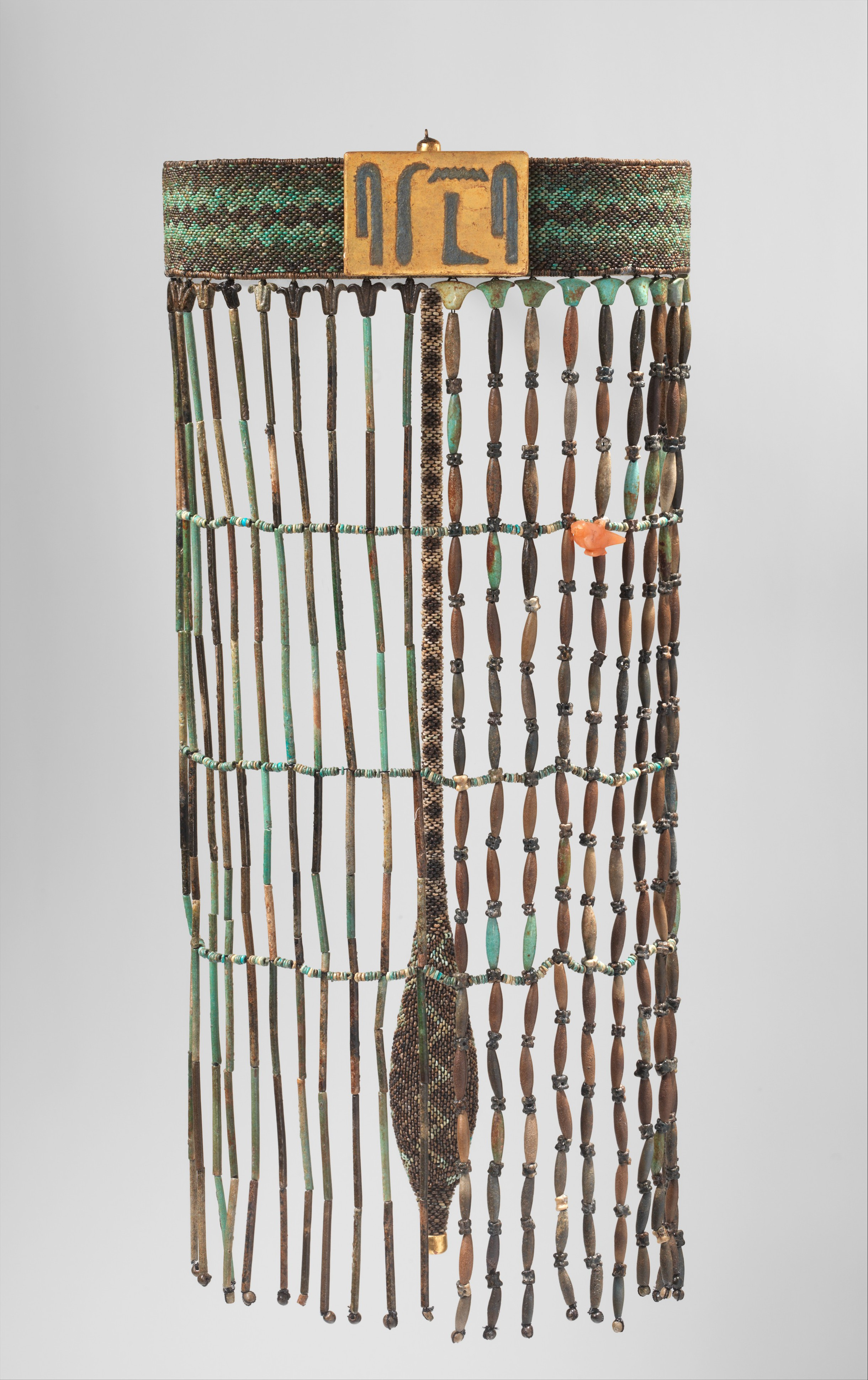
Beadwork apron of Senebtisi

Senebtisi (fl. c. 1800 BC) was an ancient Egyptian woman who lived at the end of the 12th Dynasty. She is only known from her undisturbed burial found at Lisht.

- Not to be confused with Senebtisi found at Harageh.

== Bio ==
Very little is known about Senebtisi. On the objects found in her tomb she has the second name SatApis (daughter of Apis). She bears the common title lady of the house. Her husband or parents are not mentioned in her tomb.

The burial of Senebtisi was found by an American expedition in 1907 at Lisht as part of the funerary complex belonging to the vizier Senusret. Her burial was found at the bottom of a shaft in a chamber north of this shaft.

The mummified body of Senebtisi was placed in a set of three coffins. There was an outer wooden coffin, inscribed with text, but only badly preserved. There was a middle coffin with only an inscription on gold foil on the lid. The innermost coffin was human shaped but only very badly preserved. Senebtisi was adorned with an array of personal adornments, many of them made especially just for the burial. There are three broad collars, armlets and anklets and several bead necklaces. The body was also adorned with an array of weapons and royal insignia. Around the pelvis she was wearing a royal apron. Next to the coffin were found in a niche a canopic chest with the four canopic jars. At the foot end of the coffin were discovered many pottery vessels.

Senebtisi was originally dated to the early 12th Dynasty, as her burial is part of the funerary complex of the vizier Senusret, who lived under Senusret I and Amenemhat II. More recent research has shown that she more likely dates to the end of the 12th Dynasty.

A full excavation report of the tomb appeared in 1916.

== Gallery ==
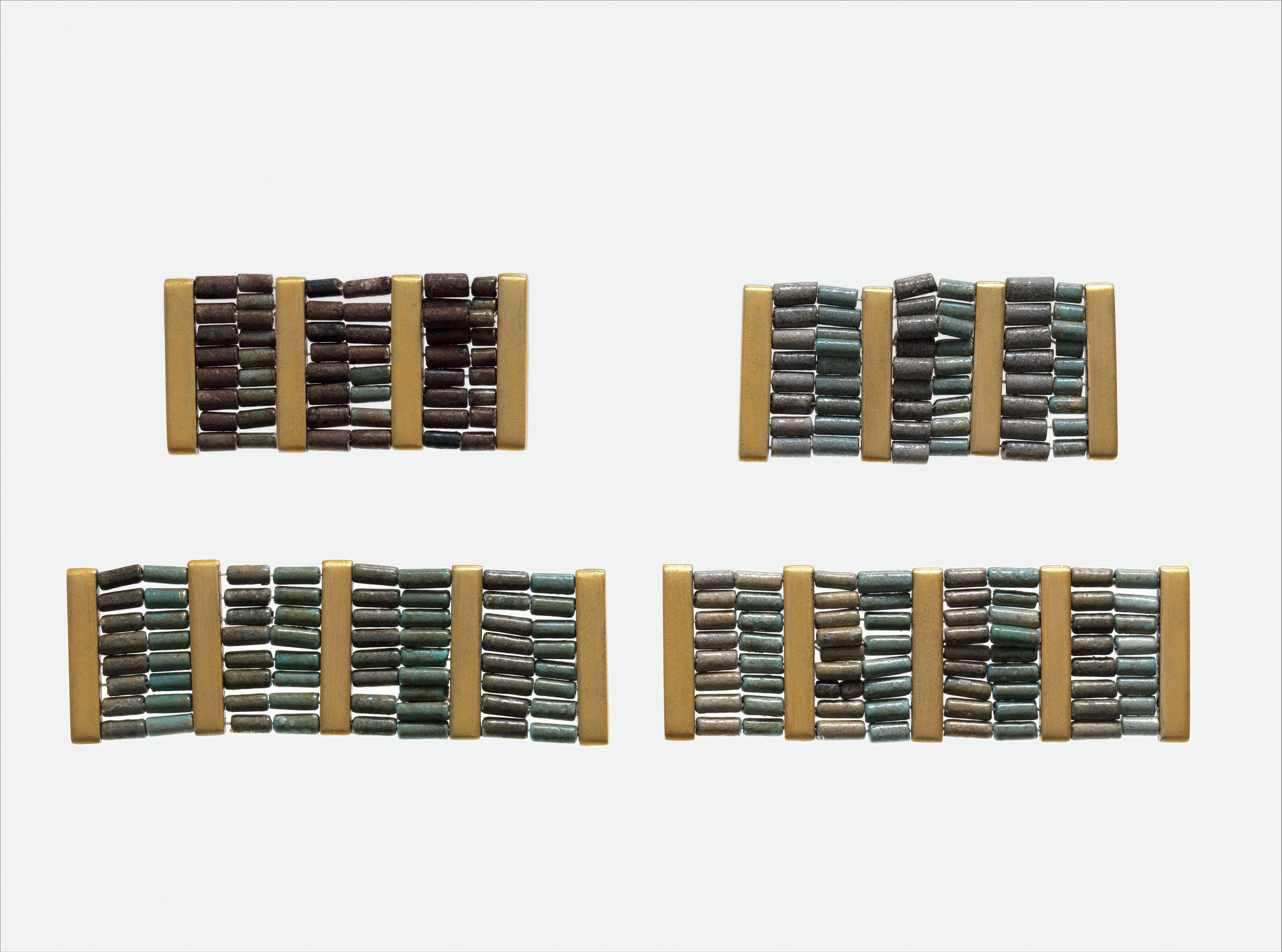
Bracelets and Anklets of Senebtisi

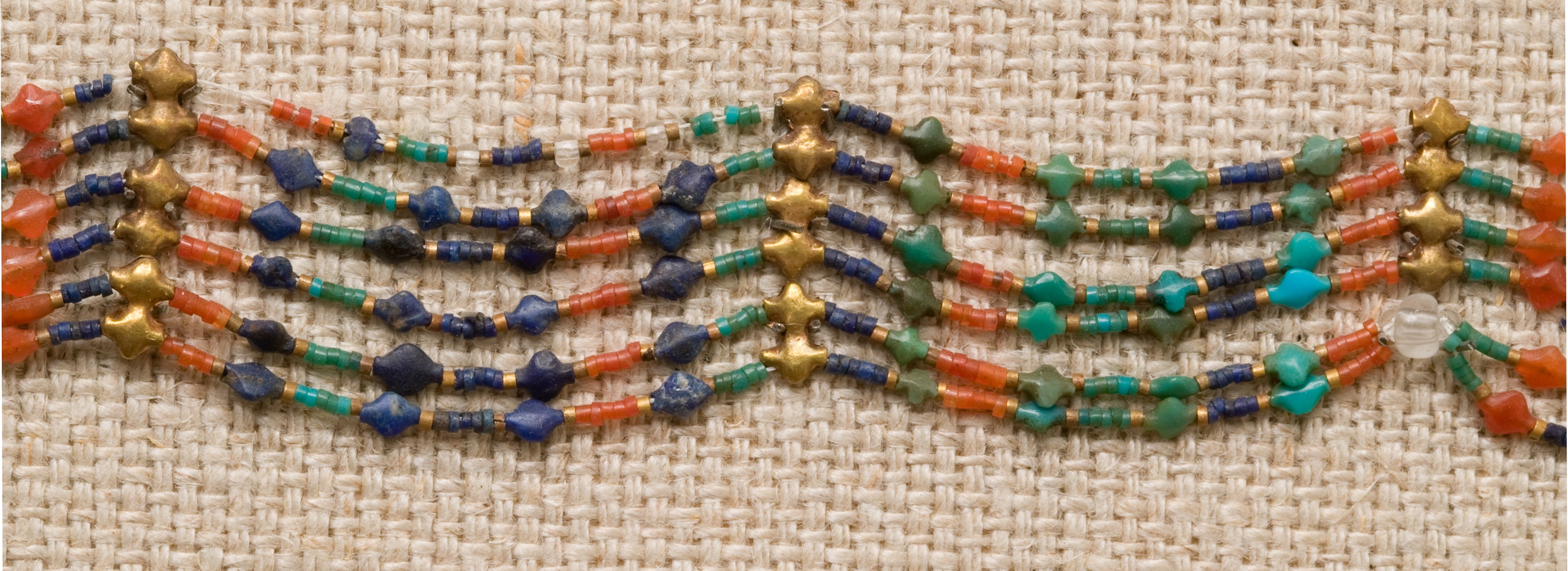
Bead Girdle of Senebtisi

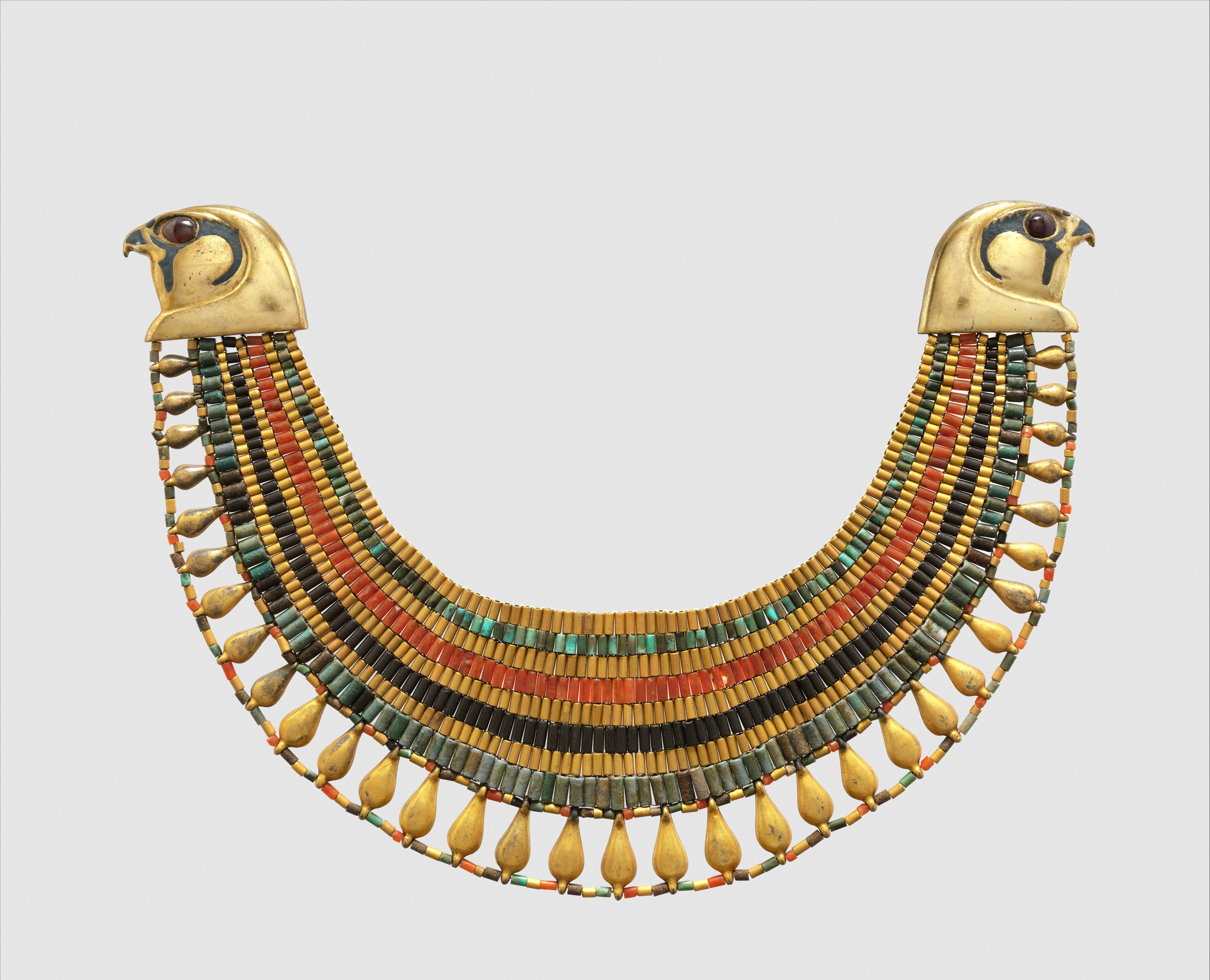
Broad collar of Senebtisi

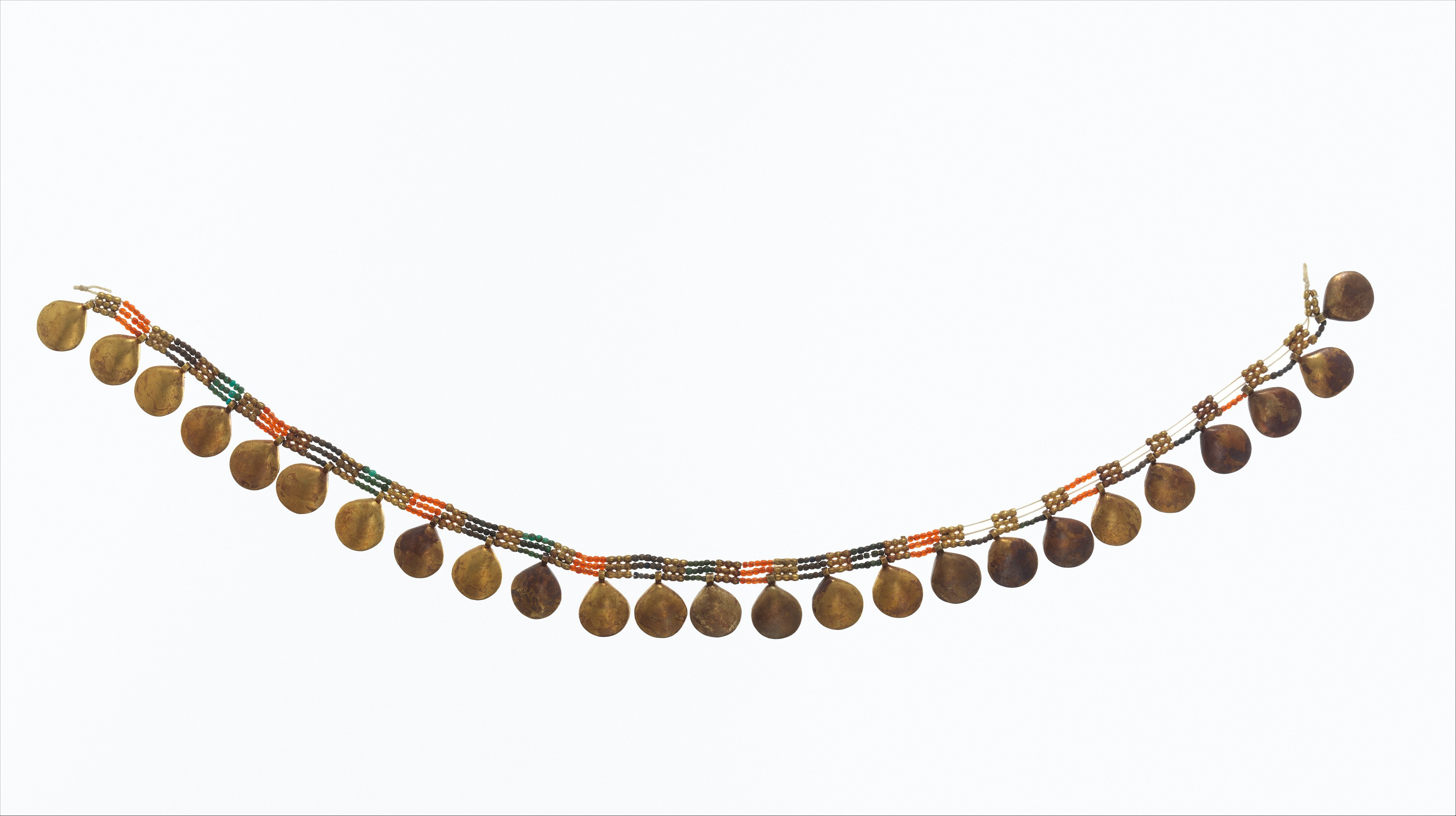
Necklace with shell pendants of Senebtisi

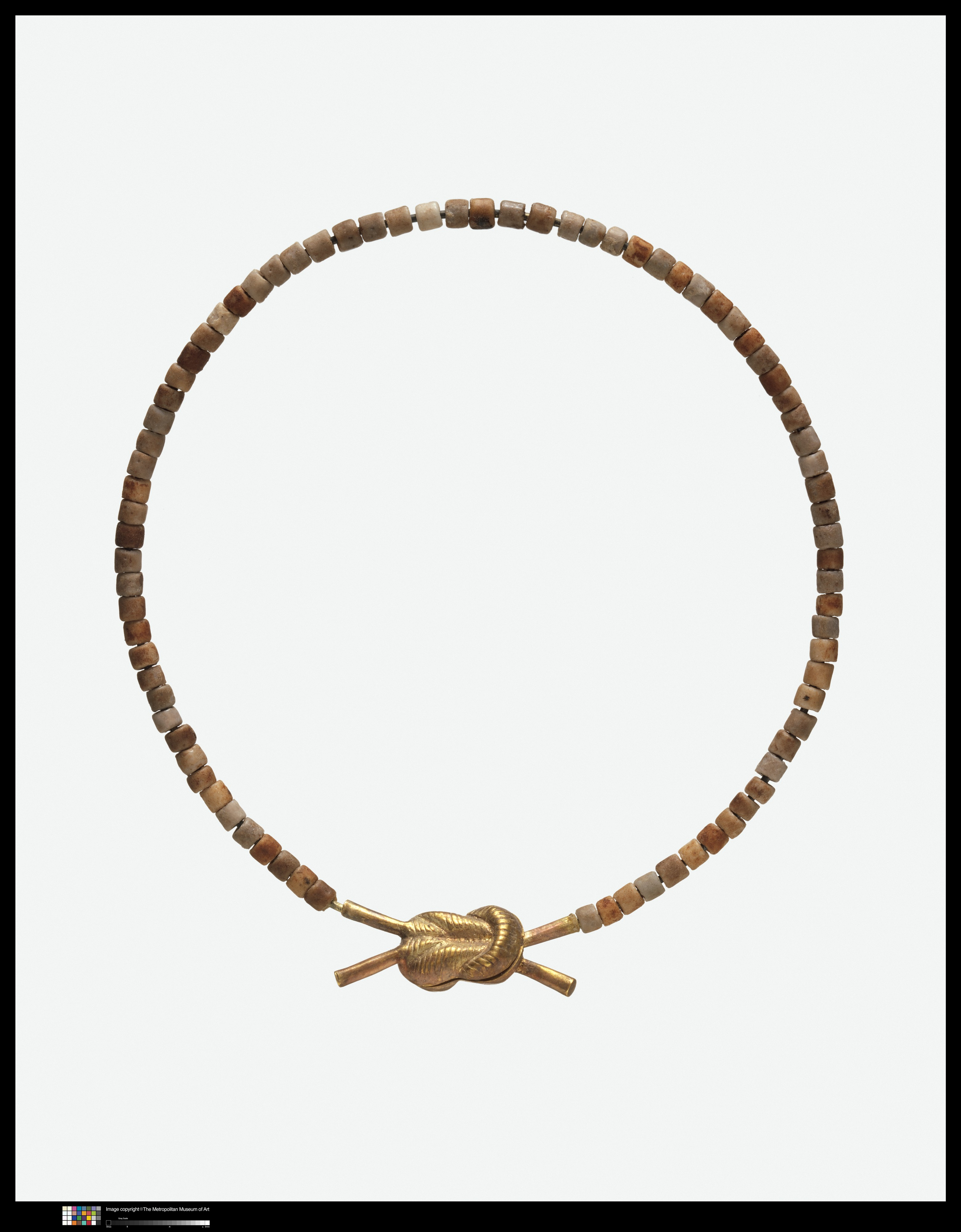
Clasp from Senebtisi's tomb

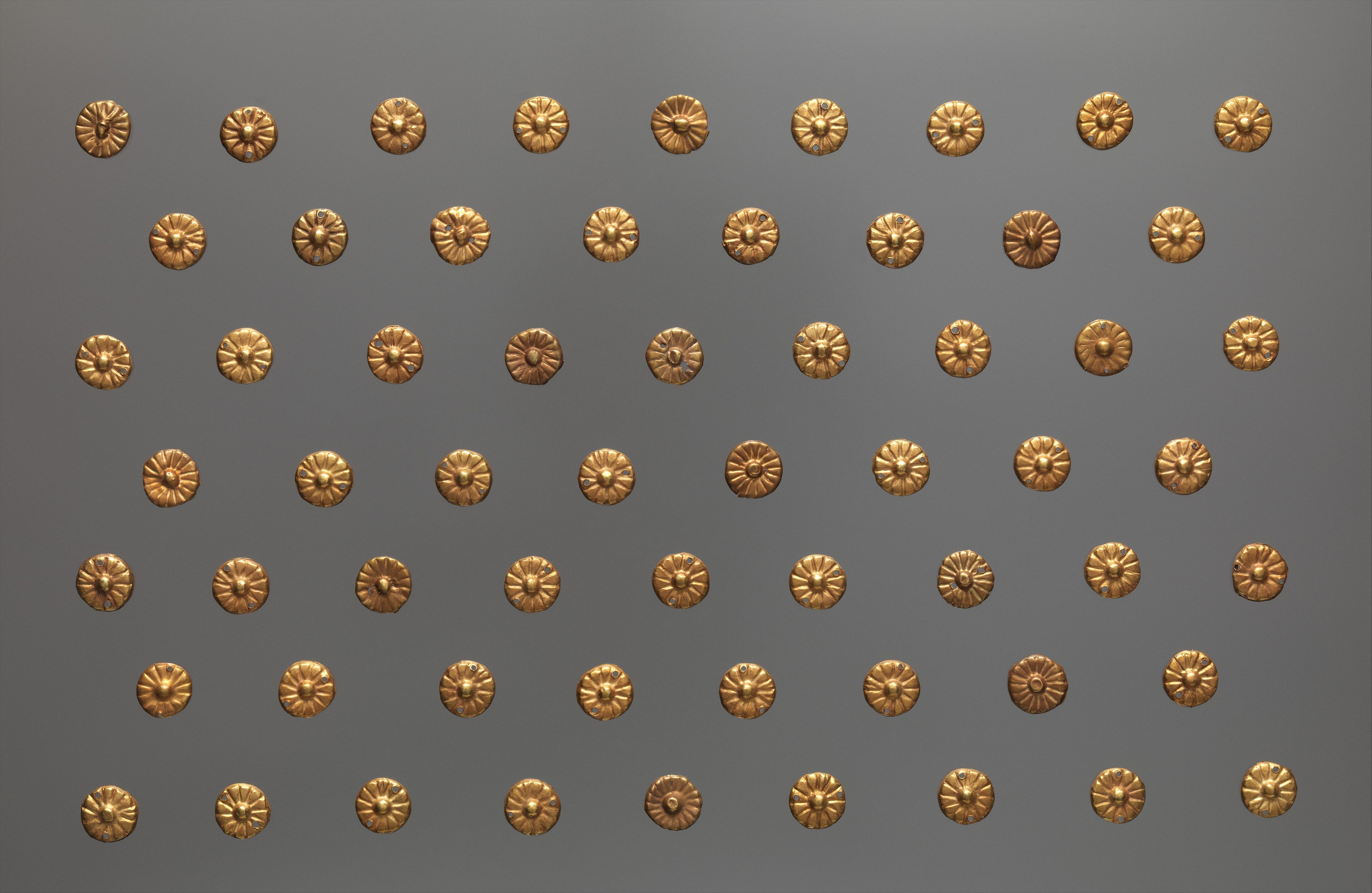
Rosettes of Senebtisi

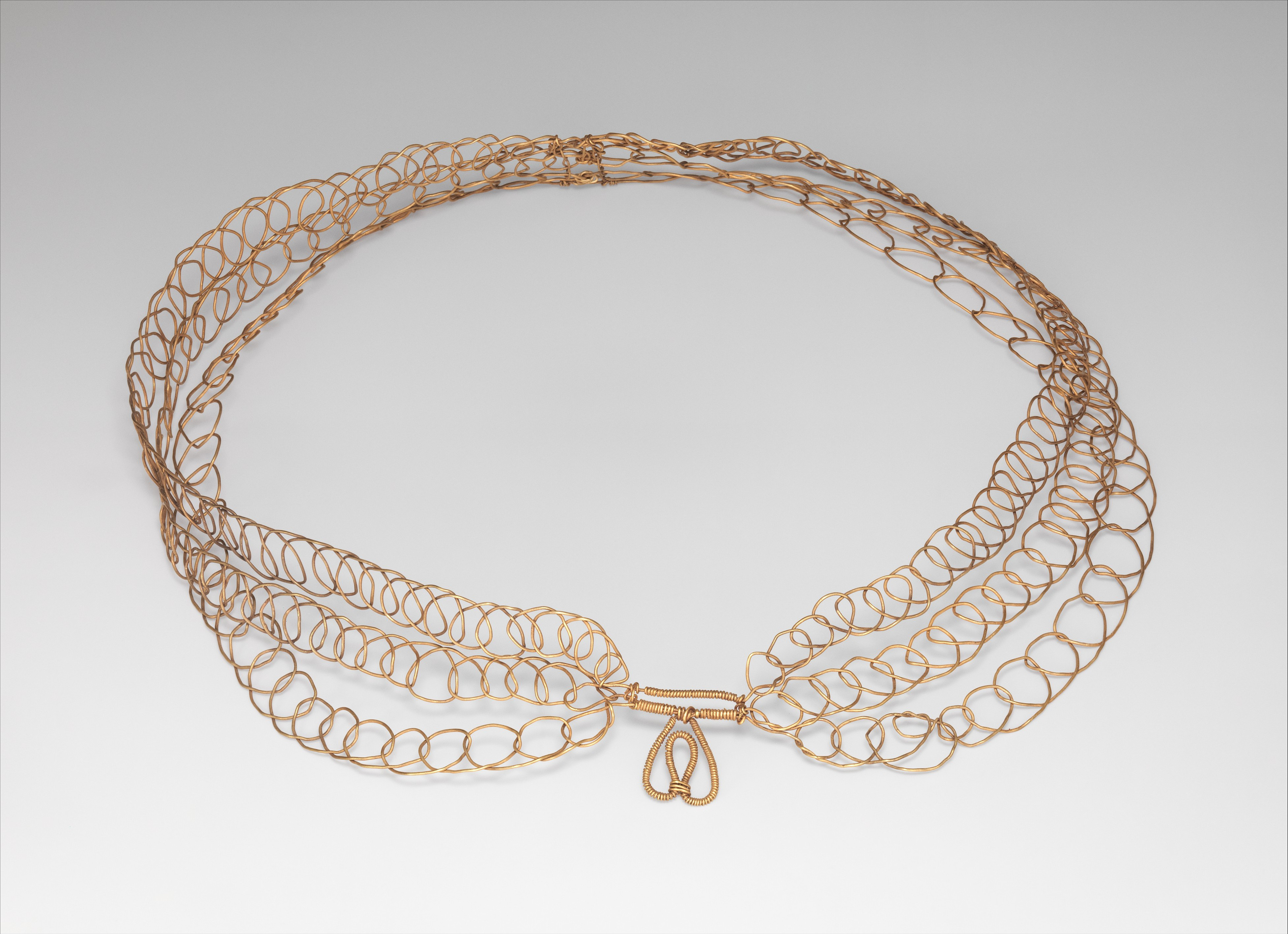
Diadem of Senebtisi
