= Pyramid of Amenemhat I =

Smooth-sided pyramid

Coordinates: 29.5749°N 31.2253°E

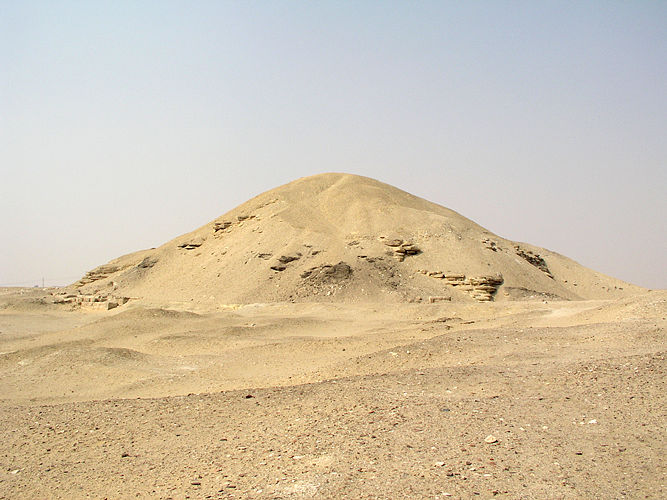
- Interactive map of Pyramid of Amenemhat I
- Location: Giza, Egypt
- Owner: Amenemhat I
Ancient name
< M17 Y5 N35 G17 F4 X1 > Q1 Q1 Q1 N28 D36 G43 O24
Swt-ḫꜥw Ỉ-mn-m-ḥꜣt
Sut-khau Amenemhat
"Cult places of Amenemhat's appearance"
- Constructed: Twelfth Dynasty
- Height: 59 m (194 ft; 113 cu)
- Base: 84 m (276 ft; 160 cu)
- Volume: 129,360 m^{3} (169,200 cu yd)
- Slope: 54°27'44"

The pyramid of Amenemhat I is an Egyptian burial structure built at Lisht by the founder of the Twelfth Dynasty of Egypt, Amenemhat I.

This structure returned to the approximate size and form of Old Kingdom pyramids. It also, however, established a new tradition of giving each component structure in the pyramid complex its own unique name. The structures together were known as "The places of the appearances of Amenemhat".

== Construction ==
Archaeological evidence suggests that Amenemhat started to build his pyramid at Thebes but for unknown reasons switched his capital and the location of his pyramid to Lisht (1991–1778 BC). The pyramid upon its completion rose to a height of 55 meters, with a base length of 83 meters and a slope of 54 degrees. The core of the pyramid was made with small rough blocks of local limestone with a loose fill of sand debris and mud brick. Some of the limestone was stripped from other monuments - blocks of stone from the pyramids of Khufu, Khafre, Unas and Pepi II (or possibly Pepi I) have been found in the pyramid. It's possible that the Khufu blocks could have come via the Mortuary complex of Unas, since Unas himself reused blocks from one of Khufu's constructions, possibly his pyramid complex at Giza, for his own pyramid, and that it could have been these same blocks that were later reused for Amenemhat's pyramid.

Inside the pyramid a sloped descending shaft blocked with granite plugs, both regular and drum shaped upon burial ran from the ground level entrance chapel to a well chamber, which below it is vertical shaft that descended directly to the burial chamber. It's thought that the design of the plugs was a security trap to deter tomb robbers, so that if they tried to dig into the well chamber and clear the blocks within, the drums would fall thru the chamber and into the shaft, blocking access to the well shaft and crushing any tomb robber stuck in the chamber. However, the security trap ended up being bypassed by tomb robbers, who tunneled around and below the shaft, bring down the floor of the descending shaft and some of the drums in the process, preventing the drums from rolling down. Some of the blocks from the well chamber were also pushed into the descending shaft to further block the drums from moving downwards. It's believed the tomb robbery occurred in the Second Intermediate Period.

The overall construction of the pyramid was poor and little of it remains today. Around the pyramid were found tombs of high officials serving the king. These include the tombs of the high steward Nakht, the treasurer Rehuerdjersen and the vizier Intefiqer.

== Excavation ==
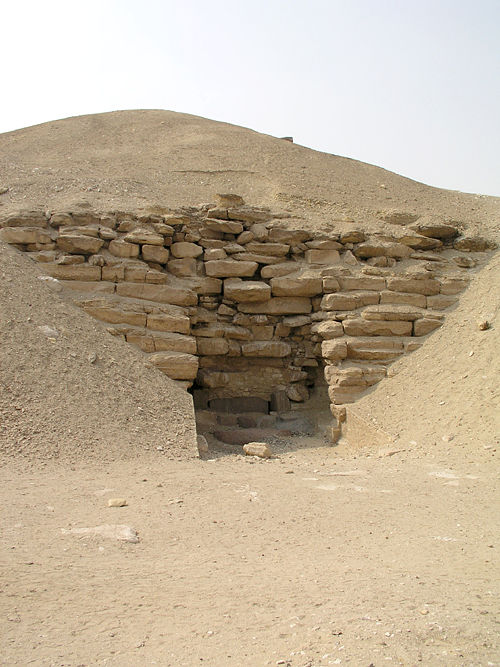
The entrance

The first excavation of the site was undertaken by the French Egyptologist Gaston Maspero in 1882. His work was later continued by a French archaeological expedition under the direction of J.E. Gautier and Gustave Jéquier in 1894 and 1895. The investigations were continued from 1920 to 1934 by Albert Lythgoe and Arthur Mace in a team from the Metropolitan Museum in New York City. By the time of these excavations the pyramid had undergone much disintegration, and it is now only 20 meters high with most of the surrounding complex gone. None of the expeditions successfully explored the interior of the pyramid due to the internal passageways being flooded with groundwater.

== See also ==
- Egyptian pyramid construction techniques
- List of Egyptian pyramids
- Lepsius list of pyramids
- Pyramid of Senusret I

== Sources ==
- Lehner, Mark (2008). The Complete Pyramids. New York: Thames & Hudson. ISBN 978-0-500-28547-3.
- Verner, Miroslav (2001). The Pyramids: The Mystery, Culture and Science of Egypt's Great Monuments. New York: Grove Press. ISBN 978-0-8021-1703-8.
- von Beckerath, Jürgen (1984). Handbuch der ägyptischen Königsnamen. München: Deutscher Kunstverlag. ISBN 9783422008328.
