= Pyramid of Senusret I =

Egyptian pyramid built to be the burial place of the Pharaoh Senusret I

Coordinates: 29°33′36.04″N 31°13′15.40″E

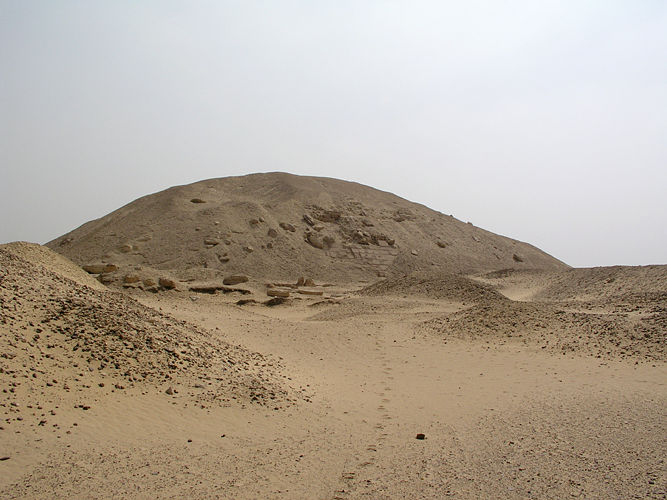
- Interactive map of Pyramid of Senusret I
- Owner: Senusret I
Ancient name
< F12 S29 D21 X1 O34 N35 > Q3 X1 D21 D4 D4 N16 N16 O24
Ptr-tʒwj Sn-wsr-t
Petr-tawy Sen-user-et
"Senusret looks down on the two lands"
- Constructed: Twelfth Dynasty
- Height: 61.25 m (201.0 ft; 116.89 cu)
- Base: 105.2 m (345 ft; 200.8 cu)
- Volume: 225,093 m^{3} (294,411 cu yd)
- Slope: 49°23′55″

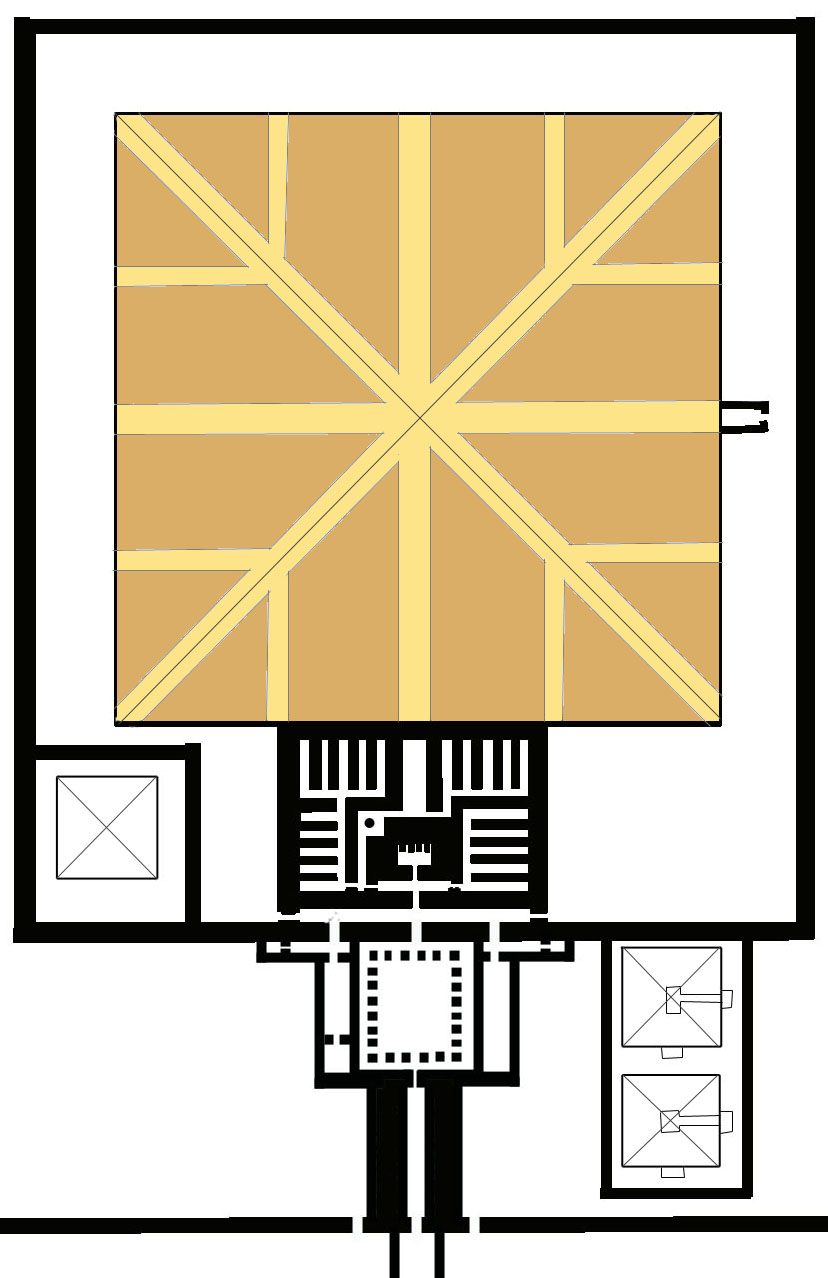
Diagram of the internal structure of the pyramid of Senusret I

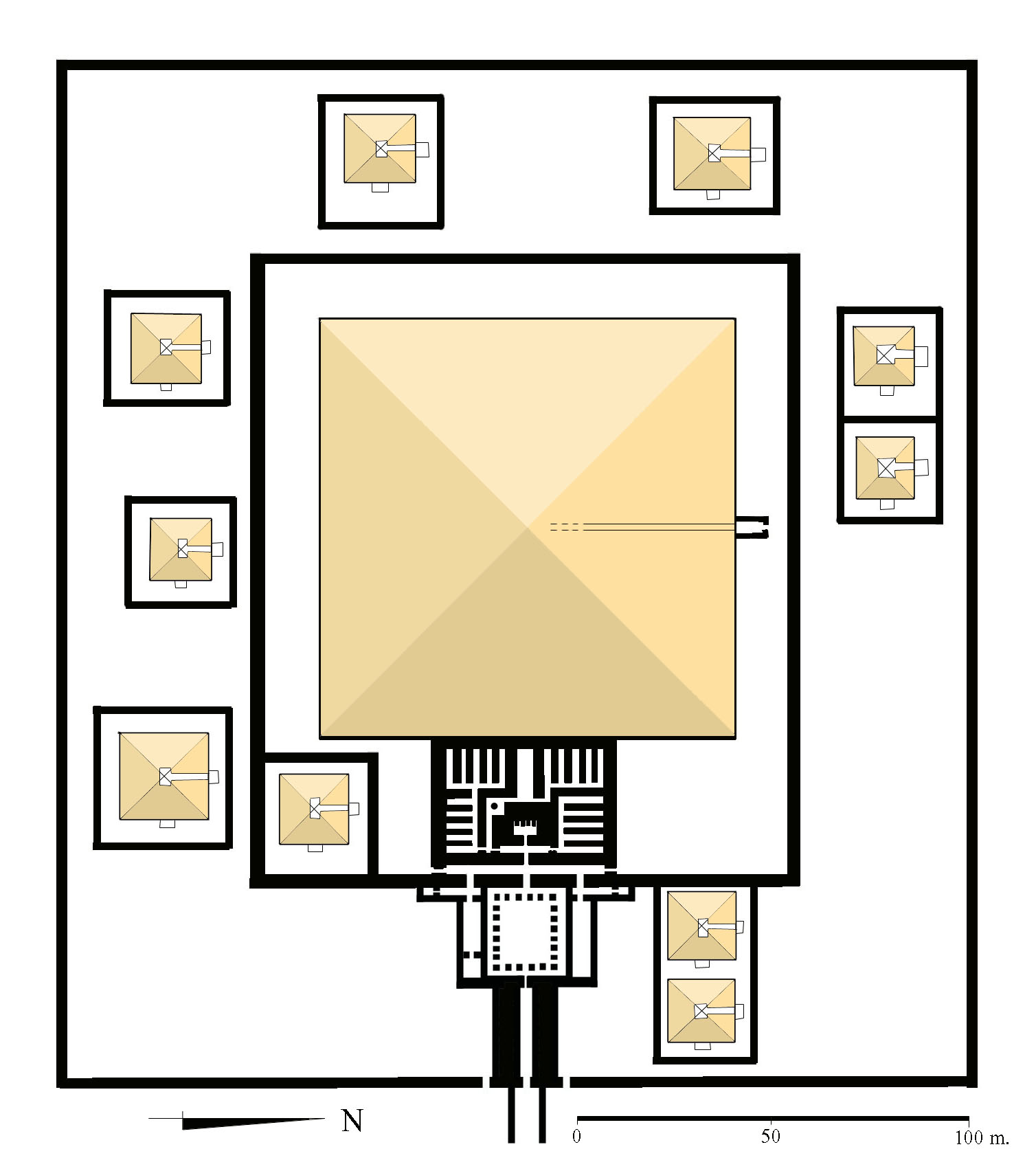
Diagram of the pyramid of Senusret I at el-Lisht and surrounding temple complex

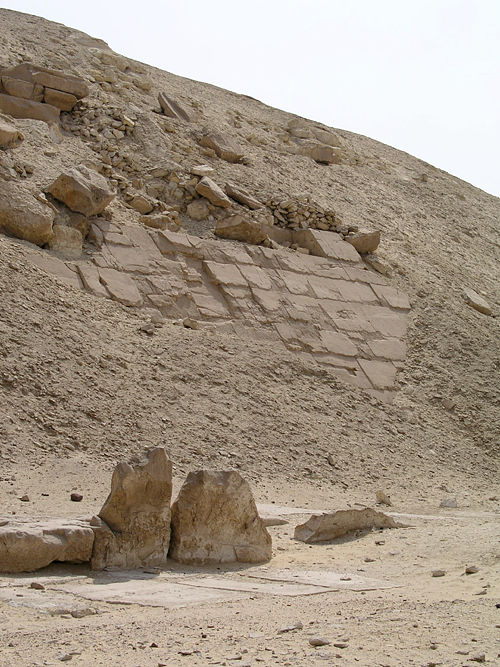
Vestiges of the stone cladding of the pyramid of Senusret I

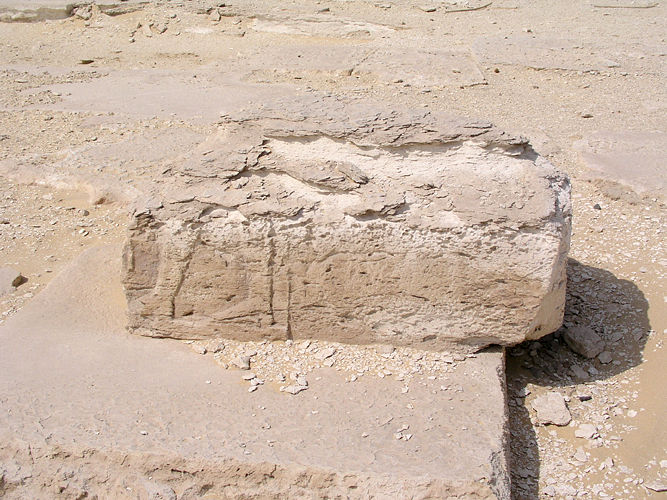
Fragments of the mortuary temple of the pyramid of Senusret I

The pyramid of Senusret I is an Egyptian pyramid built to be the burial place of the Pharaoh Senusret I. The pyramid was built during the Twelfth Dynasty of Egypt at el-Lisht, near the pyramid of his father, Amenemhat I. Its ancient name was Senusret Peter Tawi (Senusret beholds the two lands).

The pyramid was 105 meters on each side with a height of 61.25 meters; the slope of the four faces was 49° 24'. The pyramid used a method of construction never before seen in an Egyptian pyramid; four stone walls radiated from the center built of rough-hewn blocks that decreased in size the higher their placement. The eight sections formed by these walls were then subdivided by three more walls, splitting the pyramid into 32 different units which were then filled with slabs of stone as well as debris. An exoskeleton of fine limestone then covered the structure. This new method of construction was not particularly efficient, however, and the completed pyramid suffered from stability problems. Unusually, clear evidence for the ramps used to construct the pyramid also remain.

== Complex ==
Surrounding the actual structure was a comparatively large complex, which consisted of a mortuary temple, a rectangular structure with a courtyard in the center, and nine smaller pyramids for Senusret's queens. From the mortuary, a limestone causeway with carved statues set every 10 cubits ran to a public temple outside the perimeter wall of the compound. Little of this is visible today, however, because later Roman buildings were built over the complex.

== Excavations ==
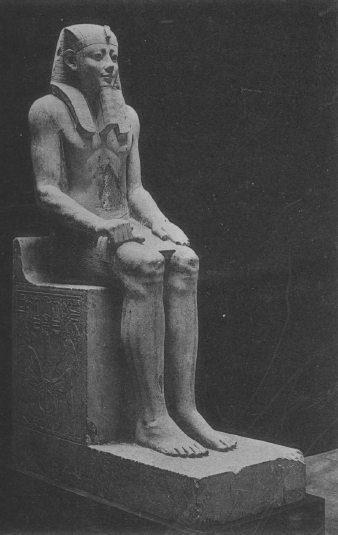
Intact statue of Senusret I from his pyramid complex at Lisht, now in the Egyptian Museum, Cairo (CG 411)

The pyramid has been severely damaged over time, and little of its limestone cladding remains. It now appears as little more than a hillock of stone. None of the excavations penetrated to the burial chamber due to high water levels, but much was learned about pyramid construction from the surrounding quarries, which contained one of the highest concentrations of ancient debris of any Egyptian archaeological site.

=== Gautier and Jequier ===
The pyramid was first explored by archaeologists Gautier and Jequier between 1894 and 1895. Many statues of Senusret I were found and are now at the Egyptian Museum in Cairo.

=== Metropolitan Museum of Art ===
From 1906 to 1943, the pyramid was excavated by a team from the Metropolitan Museum of Art headed initially by Albert Lythgoe, Arthur Mace and Ambrose Lansing.

=== Dieter Arnold ===
From 1984 to 1987, further excavation was carried out by Dieter Arnold.

== See also ==
- Egyptian pyramid construction techniques
- List of Egyptian pyramids
- List of megalithic sites

== Sources ==
- Lehner, Mark (2008). The Complete Pyramids. New York: Thames & Hudson. ISBN 978-0-500-28547-3.
- Verner, Miroslav (2001). The Pyramids: The Mystery, Culture and Science of Egypt's Great Monuments. New York: Grove Press. ISBN 978-0-8021-1703-8.
