= Lisht =

- Location in Egypt
- Coordinates: 29°34′13″N 31°13′52″E
- Country: Egypt
- Governorate: Giza Governorate
- Time zone: UTC+2 (EET)
  - Summer (DST): UTC+3 (EEST)

Lisht or el-Lisht (Arabic: اللشت, romanized: Al-Lišt) is an Egyptian village located south of Cairo. It is the site of Middle Kingdom royal and elite burials, including two pyramids built by Amenemhat I and Senusret I. The two main pyramids were surrounded by smaller pyramids of members of the royal family, and many mastaba tombs of high officials and their family members. They were constructed throughout the Twelfth and Thirteenth Dynasties. The site is also known for the tomb of Senebtisi, found undisturbed and from which a set of jewelry has been recovered. The pyramid complex of Senusret I is the best preserved from this period. The coffins in the tomb of Sesenebnef present the earliest versions of the Book of the Dead.

== Overview ==
The ancient Egyptian site of el-Lisht can be found on the west bank of the Nile River, around 65 km south of the city of Cairo. It is a Twelfth Dynasty necropolis, close to the city of Itj-Tawy from which the modern village presumably (given the proposed older form Al-Isht) takes name.

The Eleventh Dynasty’s capital was located at the city of Thebes. The first king of the Twelfth Dynasty, Amenemhet I, moved the capital from Thebes to a city near el-Lisht called Itj-tawy, because it was close to the mouth of the Fayyum, and well situated to control the 'Two Lands' of Upper and Lower Egypt. Another motive suggested is land reclamation and desire to increase the agricultural output for the region. The ruins of Itj-Tawy have never been conclusively identified, and the only locational evidence discovered consists of pieces of pottery in the area it is believed to be in. However, Twelfth Dynasty rulers built pyramids at el-Lisht which are known to researchers.

El-Lisht is the necropolis of the first two rulers of Dynasty XII, Amenemhet I and his son and successor Senusret I. These pyramids would have been visible to those traveling to Itj-Tawy from the south. The more famous of the two monumental complexes, that of Amenemhat I, featured an offering hall with a granite altar, carved with depictions of representatives of the nomes (provinces) bringing offerings to the pharaoh. However, the pyramid itself is in a ruined state, rising approximately 20 m (66 ft) above ground level.

El-Lisht is notable for its commissioners' 'cannibalization' of earlier monuments, which is thought to symbolize the restoration of Egypt to its Old Kingdom glory. The change in relief carving styles in the Twelfth Dynasty is also apparent in the two pyramids at this site.

== Excavations ==
El-Lisht was first excavated in 1882 by the French Egyptologist Gaston Maspero. Maspero was from Paris but had an interest in the history of Egypt so went on to study under Auguste Mariette. When Mariette died Maspero took on the archeological mission. His interest in ancient Egypt originally took him there to excavate for the French government but later he went on to found the French Institute for Oriental Archaeology. This group further excavated the site from 1884 until 1885. From 1906 to 1934 the Egyptian Expedition of the Metropolitan Museum of Art, New York, continued to work on el-Lisht. In this time period Egyptologists were able to excavate for fourteen seasons. The Metropolitan Museum of Art returned to el-Lisht between 1984 and 1991.

=== North side of el-Lisht: Pyramid of Amenemhet I ===
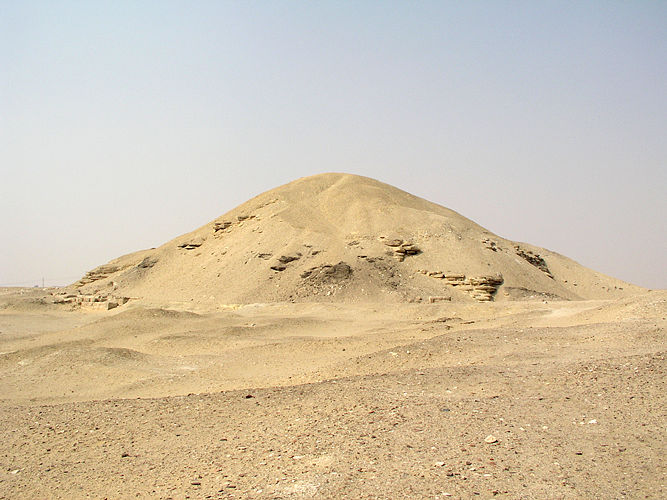
The ruined pyramid of Amenemhet I at Lisht

The Pyramid of Amenemhet I was about 55 meters tall when originally built but because of poor construction, quarrying, and tomb robberies, it now stands at approximately 20m in height. Apart from poor construction, the material used to build the pyramid was not durable. Studies show it was made from unfired mudbrick and stones from other monuments. The mudbrick, sand, and debris would have been the material of choice since each was readily available, and mudbrick proved cheap since the city was so close to the Fayyum. Specifically, stones from the monuments of Khufu, Khafre, Unas, and Pepi II (or possibly Pepi I) have been found at Amenemhat's funerary complex.

Subsequent excavations uncovered plans for a pyramid much larger than the building constructed. One theory is that the terrain of the site was unsuitable for the structure due to poor sloping topography. Alternatively, it has been suggested that the pharaoh's health could have been declining and he did not think he would live to see it finished in time, yet did not want to be buried in an unfinished tomb. A third theory holds that Amenemhat I had already died after designing the tomb, and his son and successor rushed through his father's memorial so that he could start construction on his own.

The pyramid's true entrance is found on its north side. From here, a hallway lined with pink granite leads to a small room at the core of the pyramid, from where a shaft connects to the burial chamber. The chamber has been filled with Nile seepage water over the years, making new discoveries difficult. Attempts have been made to keep water out but pumping has not worked. No full statues of Amenemhat I were unearthed during archaeological expeditions. However, a limestone statuette's head, thought to belong to an image of the pharaoh, has been discovered.

Other north-side excavations

- Tomb 384 of Rehuerdjersen
- Tomb 400 of Intefiqer
- Tomb 470 of Senimeru
- Tomb 493 of Nakht
- Tomb 758 of Senusret, shaft with undisturbed tomb of Senebtisi
- Tomb 954
- Tomb 956
- Pit 412, find place of stelae mentioned the king's son Hepu and the queen Abetni

=== South side of el-Lisht: Pyramid of Senusret I ===
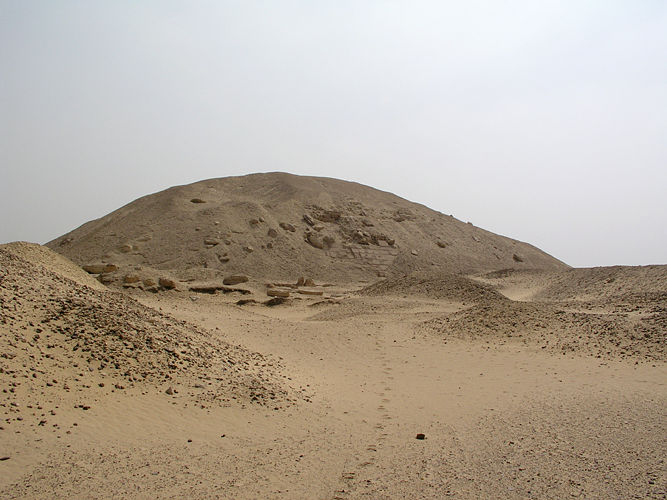
The Pyramid of Senusret I

Senusret I built his pyramid on the southern side of el-Lisht, around a mile south of his father's funerary complex. This pyramid, named 'Senusret Looks Down on Both Lands' was also discovered by Gaston Maspero in 1882. He was able to identify the owner from objects in the pyramid marked with the pharaoh's name. The excavation team found relief blocks, fragments, and small shrines on the site that were consistent with Middle Kingdom art. Then in 1894, the site was excavated by archeologists J.E. Gautier and G. Jequier who worked there until 1895. Many statues of Senusret I were found and are now at the Egyptian Museum in Cairo. From 1906 until 1943 a team from the Metropolitan Museum of Art excavated it. Later, from 1984 to 1987, further excavation was carried out by Dieter Arnold.

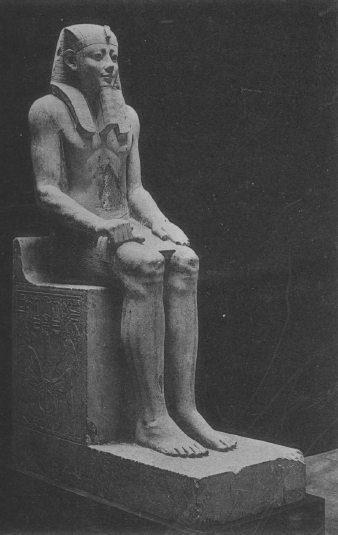
Intact statue of Senusret I from his pyramid complex at Lisht, now in the Egyptian Museum, Cairo (CG 411)

The pyramid of Senusret I was much larger than that of Amenemhet I. Its base was 105 meters wide, with a height that once reached 61.25 meters tall. Although he followed a similar plan to that of his father, architects used a new technique. In theory, this new technique was supposed to make the pyramid stronger. The architects built outward from a core of coarse limestone blocks filled in with mudbrick and debris, then revetted the central structure with heavy blocks and surrounded it with a smooth casing of white limestone from Tureh. This technique continued to be used for much of the Middle Kingdom.

The unroofed causeway leading to the pyramid was punctuated with alcoves in which stood large limestone statues of Senusret I- some of these are now on show at the Metropolitan Museum of Art in New York and at the Museum of Egyptian Antiquities in Cairo. The causeway was also flanked by mudbrick buildings for the use of the priests who would perform rituals for the deceased monarch. The north side of the pyramid was fronted by a small chapel with an alabaster false door stela, decorated with pictures of offerings being presented. The funerary temple lay to the east, at the head of the valley causeway leading to the pyramid, and was similar in style to that of Pepi II, a Sixth Dynasty pharaoh. The central passage within the pyramid led to a burial chamber containing sculpted lion heads that would sprout water out which would flow away through a drain.

While some of the inner framework of Senusret's pyramid has been preserved, the pyramid itself is almost all rubble. The burial chamber is flooded by Nile seepage water, and many of the pyramid's treasures were stolen in antiquity. According to the excavations, the tomb was robbed shortly after being sealed. Besides the central tomb passage, another tunnel has been found, its use being to transport funerary materials to the chambers. Maspero concluded that the transporting tunnel was used by thieves to rob the pyramid because this is where funerary goods from the king’s chambers were found.

Other south-side excavations

- Tomb of Senewosret-Ankh
- Tomb of a certain Senusret, shaft of Hapy, found untouched
- Tomb of Intef (?)
- French tomb
- Tomb of Imhotep
- Tomb of Mentuhotep
- Tomb, South-Khor A
- Tomb, South-Khor B
- Tomb A in South area
- Tomb of Djehuty
- Tomb of Ipi
- Tomb D in South area
- Tomb E in South area
- Tomb of Sehetepibreankh

=== Funerary temples at el-Lisht ===
Both Amenemhet I and Senusret I had funerary temples, but archeologists know more about Senusret because his father's is almost completely destroyed. The only remains of Amenemhet I funerary temple are carvings of Nile god and Nome deities. It is thought that Senusret had Amenemhet rebuilt because his name is on the foundation of the temple remains. Since there is more left of Senusret I's temple, it was easier to reconstruct the original architectural plan for it. We know it was similar to those found in Dynasty VI with a courtyard, portico, and offering hall with store rooms on either side. Years later, the tombs of wives, children, and close officials began to be plotted around the temples of these kings. It turned into a honeycomb of graves for their families and servants that multiplied with each generation. After the fall of the dynasty, the necropolis was no longer thought to be in need of guarding so grave robbers and looters descended.

== See also ==
- List of ancient Egyptian sites, including sites of temples
- List of Egyptian pyramids
- List of megalithic sites
