= Dieter Arnold =

German Egyptologist

Dieter Arnold (born 1936 in Heidelberg) is a German Egyptologist.

== Biography ==
He received his doctorate on 31 January 1961 from LMU Munich with the thesis "Wall relief and spatial function in Egyptian temples of the New Kingdom".

Arnold worked for the German Archaeological Institute in Cairo during excavations in Dahshur, Deir el-Bahari and El-Tarif.

From 1979 to 1984, he was a professor at the University of Vienna and then a curator at the Egyptian Department of the Metropolitan Museum of Art in New York. Arnold's specialty is the architecture of Ancient Egypt. As an employee of the Metropolitan Museum, he leads the museum's annual expeditions to el-Lisht and Dahshur.

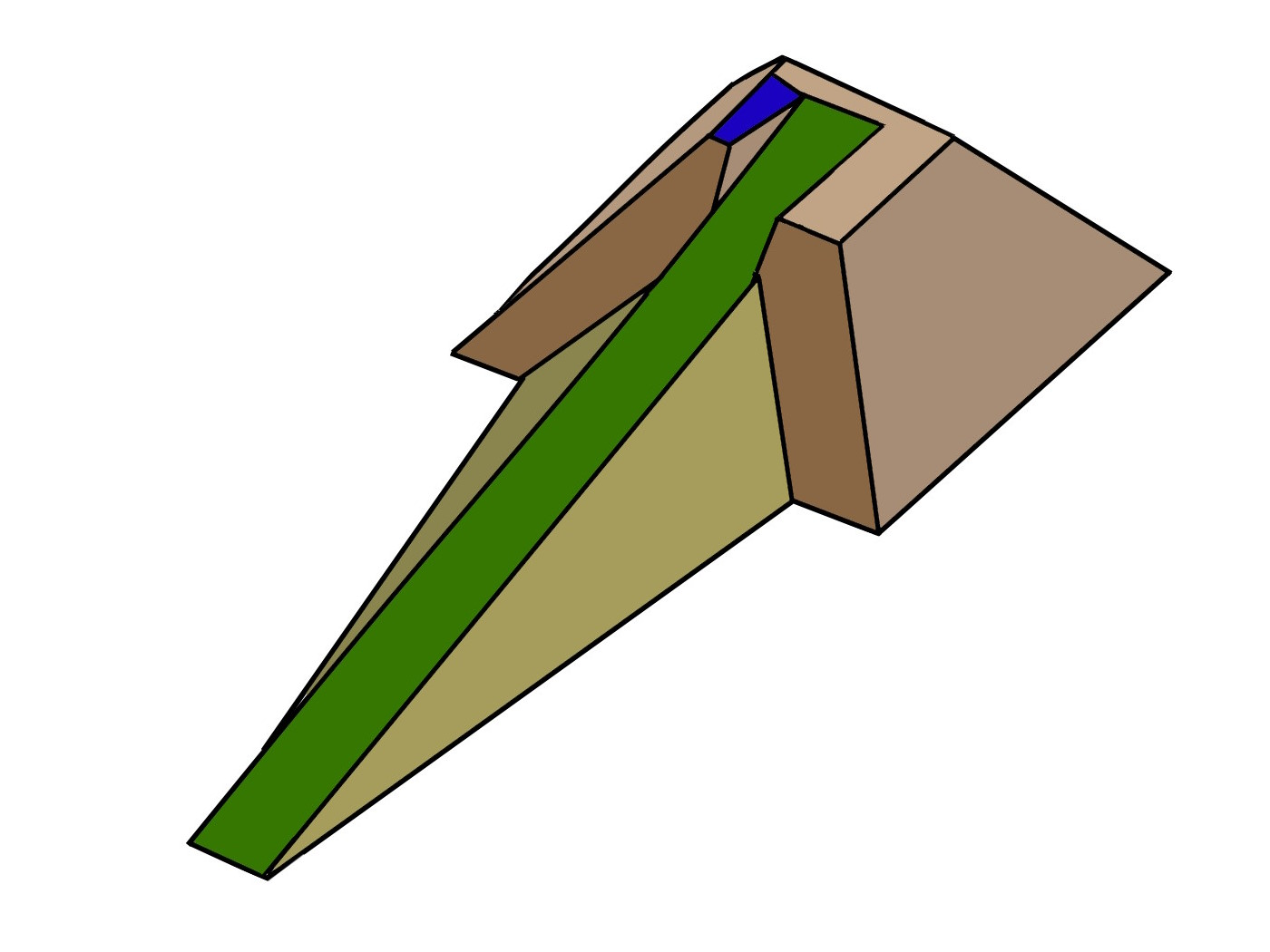
Ramp model by Dieter Arnold

In 1981, he published a proposal for the construction of the Great Pyramid. The ramp runs first outside and then in a corridor inside the pyramid. Arnold was aware that the construction method could not be explained purely archaeologically due to the lack of finds: "It is no longer possible to determine how the Egyptian builders managed their work. However, the examples of the Cheops and Chephren pyramids demonstrate that they succeeded in solving the problem".

Arnold is married to the Egyptologist Dorothea Arnold.

== Publications ==
- Der Pyramidenbezirk des Königs Amenemhet III. in Dahschur. Band 1: Die Pyramide (= Archäologische Veröffentlichungen. Vol. 53). von Zabern, Mainz 1987, ISBN 3-8053-0608-3.
- The Pyramid of Senwosret I (= Publications of the Metropolitan Museum of Art Egyptian Expedition. Band 22). Metropolitan Museum of Art, New York 1988, ISBN 0-87099-506-5 (Online).
- Building in Egypt. Pharaonic Stone Masonry. Oxford University Press, Oxford u. a. 1991, ISBN 978-0-19-511374-7.
- The Pyramid Complex of Senwosret I PDF (= Publications of the Metropolitan Museum of Art Egyptian Expedition. Band 25). Metropolitan Museum of Art, New York 1992, ISBN 0-87099-612-6 (Online).
- Die Tempel Ägyptens. Götterwohnungen, Kultstätten, Baudenkmäler. Artemis & Winkler, Munich / Zurich 1992, ISBN 3-7608-1073-X.
- Lexikon der ägyptischen Baukunst. Artemis & Winkler, Munich / Zurich 1994, ISBN 3-7608-1099-3.
- Temples of the Last Pharaos. Oxford University Press, New York (NY) u. a. 1999, ISBN 0-19-512633-5.
- The Pyramid Complex of Senwosret III at Dahshur. Architectural Studies PDF (= Publications of the Metropolitan Museum Egyptian Expedition. Band 26). Metropolitan Museum of Art, New York 2002, ISBN 0-87099-956-7 (Online).
- Middle Kingdom Tomb Architecture at Lisht PDF (= Publications of the Metropolitan Museum of Art Egyptian Expedition. Band 28). Metropolitan Museum of Art, New York 2008, ISBN 978-1-58839-194-0 (PDF)
- The Pyramid Complex of Amenemhat I at Lisht. The Architecture (= Publications of the Metropolitan Museum of Art Egyptian Expedition. Vol. 29). Metropolitan Museum of Art, New York 2016, ISBN 978-1-58839-604-4.

== Literature ==
- Peter Jánosi (ed): Structure and Significance. Thoughts on Ancient Egyptian Architecture (= Österreichische Akademie der Wissenschaften. Denkschriften der Gesamtakademie. Volume 33/ Untersuchungen der Zweigstelle Kairo des Österreichischen Archäologischen Instituts. Volume 25). Verlag der österreichischen Akademie der Wissenschaften, Vienna 2005, ISBN 3-7001-3552-1 (Festschrift for Dieter Arnold).
