= Henutsen =

Egyptian queen consort

Henutsen in hieroglyphs
Personal name:
V28 W24 t S29 n
Henutsen
ḥnw.t-sn
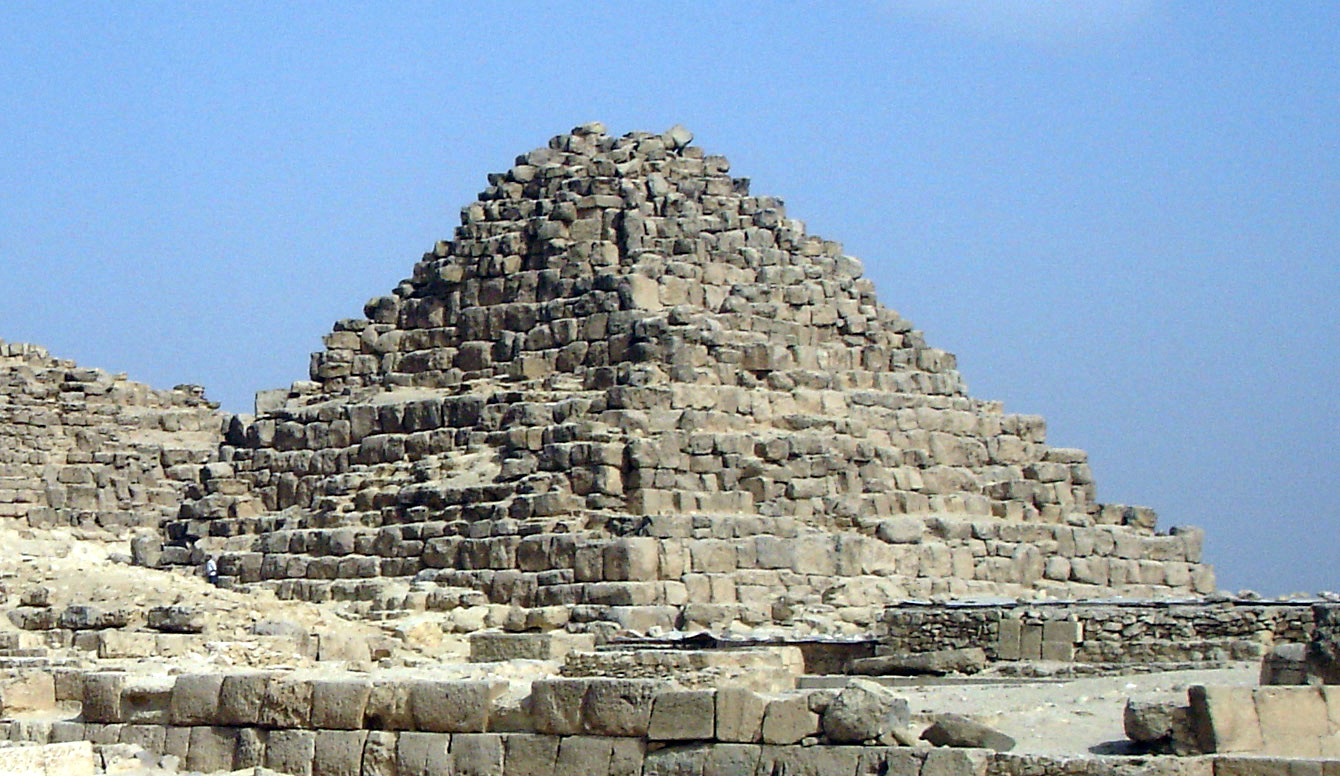
- Pyramid G1c at Giza

Henutsen is the name of an ancient Egyptian queen consort who lived during the 4th dynasty of the Old Kingdom Period. She was the second or third wife of pharaoh Khufu and most possibly buried at Giza.

== Identity ==
=== Life ===
Little is known about Henutsen's life. Some scholars believe, that she was the daughter of pharaoh Sneferu, but this is not commonly accepted. Henutsen is not known to have ever borne the title "king's daughter" or "king's bodily daughter", both titles which would have unmistakably designated her as a princess. The only document describing her as a princess is the famous Inventory Stela from the 26th Dynasty (Saite Period). The artifact is identified by scholars as a contemporary fake created by Saitic priests, thus the information about Henutsen's royal status as a princess are questioned. The only royal title that is proven for her is the title of a "king's wife".

=== Children ===
Henutsen is known to have given birth to at least two princes, Khufukhaf and Minkhaf. In case that Khufukhaf was not identical to king Khafre, Henutsen maybe was Khafre's mother, too. All her sons are buried at Giza. The mastaba tomb of Khufukhaf was partially destroyed during the Middle Kingdom Period in attempt to make place for a temple of the goddess Isis.

== Burial ==
Henutsen was most possibly interred in Pyramid G1-c. Egyptologists believe that this pyramid was originally not part of Khufu's pyramid complex, but later added, as its southern side is not aligned with that of the Great Pyramid. In fact, the pyramid's southern side is aligned with Khufukhaf's mastaba tomb nearby. Rainer Stadelmann additionally believes that prince Khufukhaf was identical to king Khafre and that Khafre erected G1-c as the tomb for his (now royal) mother. Pyramid G1-c was long time thought to be a satellite pyramid, because it did not come with a boat pit, as it was the case for the pyramids Pyramid G1-a and Pyramid G1-b. G1-c was later identified as an unfinished pyramid which was constructed in a hurry.
