= Pyramid G1-c =

Subsidiary pyramid of the Great Pyramid of Giza

Coordinates: 29°58′40.26″N 31°8′10.52″E

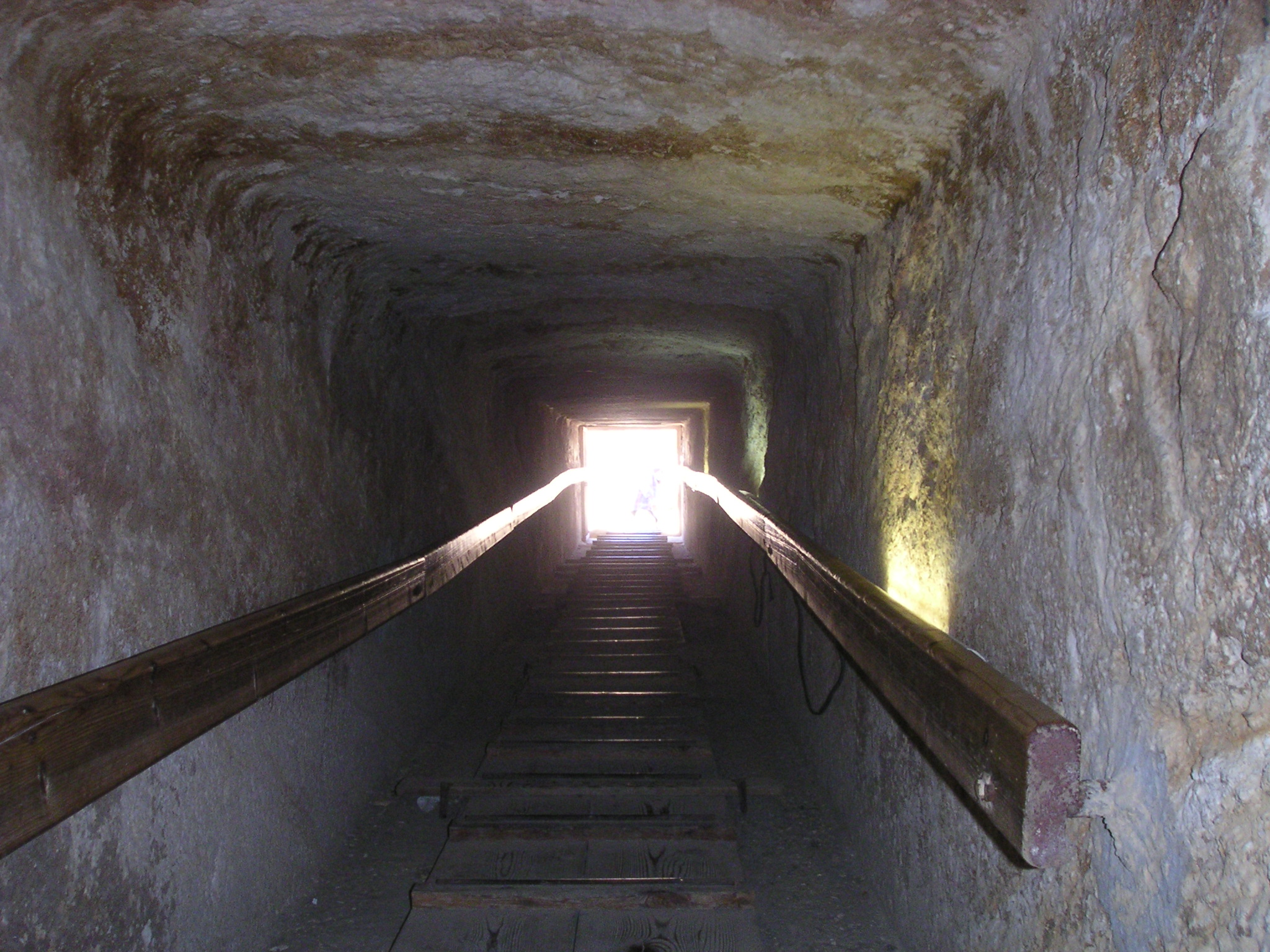
- Tunnel of Pyramid G1-c in 2004
- Interactive map of Pyramid G1-c
- Ancient name: G1-a
- Height: 29.6 meters
- Base: 46.25 meters

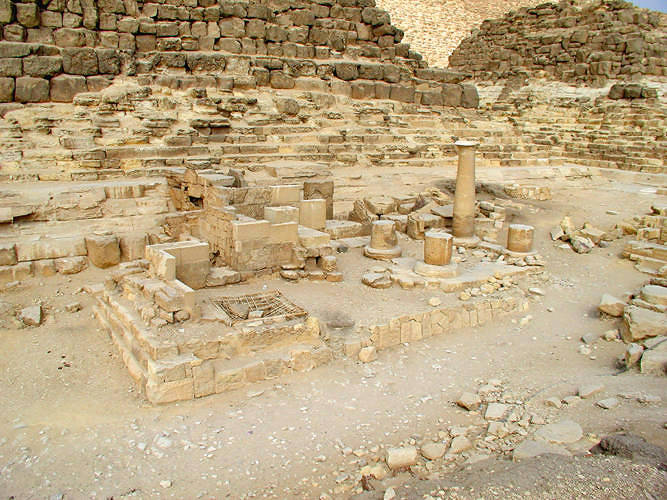
Remains of the Temple of Isis before Pyramid G1-c in 2007

G1-c is one of the subsidiary pyramids of the Giza East Field of the Giza Necropolis immediately to the eastern side of the Great Pyramid of Giza, built during the Fourth Dynasty of Egypt. It is the southern of the three pyramids of the queens and is the one of Queen Henutsen. It is 46.25 metres wide and had a height of 29.6 metres. A niche, four inches deep was dug in the south wall of the burial chamber. Pyramid G1-c was originally not a part of Khufu's pyramid complex, as its southern side is aligned not with the side of the Great Pyramid, but with Khufukhaf I's mastaba tomb nearby. Pyramid G1-c was at some point thought to possibly be a satellite pyramid, because it did not come with a boat pit like pyramids G1-a and G1-b. It was later determined to be an unfinished pyramid which was constructed in a hurry. Henutsen is thought to have been buried in the tomb. Dr. Rainer Stadelmann believes Khufukhaf is the same person as Khafra and the pyramid was built by him for his mother, but this identification is doubtful.

This temple was built by incorporating elements of an ancient funerary chapel. A stele from the New Kingdom was discovered in the remains of the temple. This monument bears an inscription epigraph allowing us to attribute the pyramid of Queen Henutsen:

The living Horus Medju Hor, King of Upper and Lower Egypt, Khufu, received life. It is next to the tabernacle-the-Sphinx, northwest of the home of Osiris, Lord of Rasetawy, he established the House of Isis. It is next to the temple of the goddess that he built his pyramid. It is next to the temple he built a pyramid for the king's daughter, Henutsen.

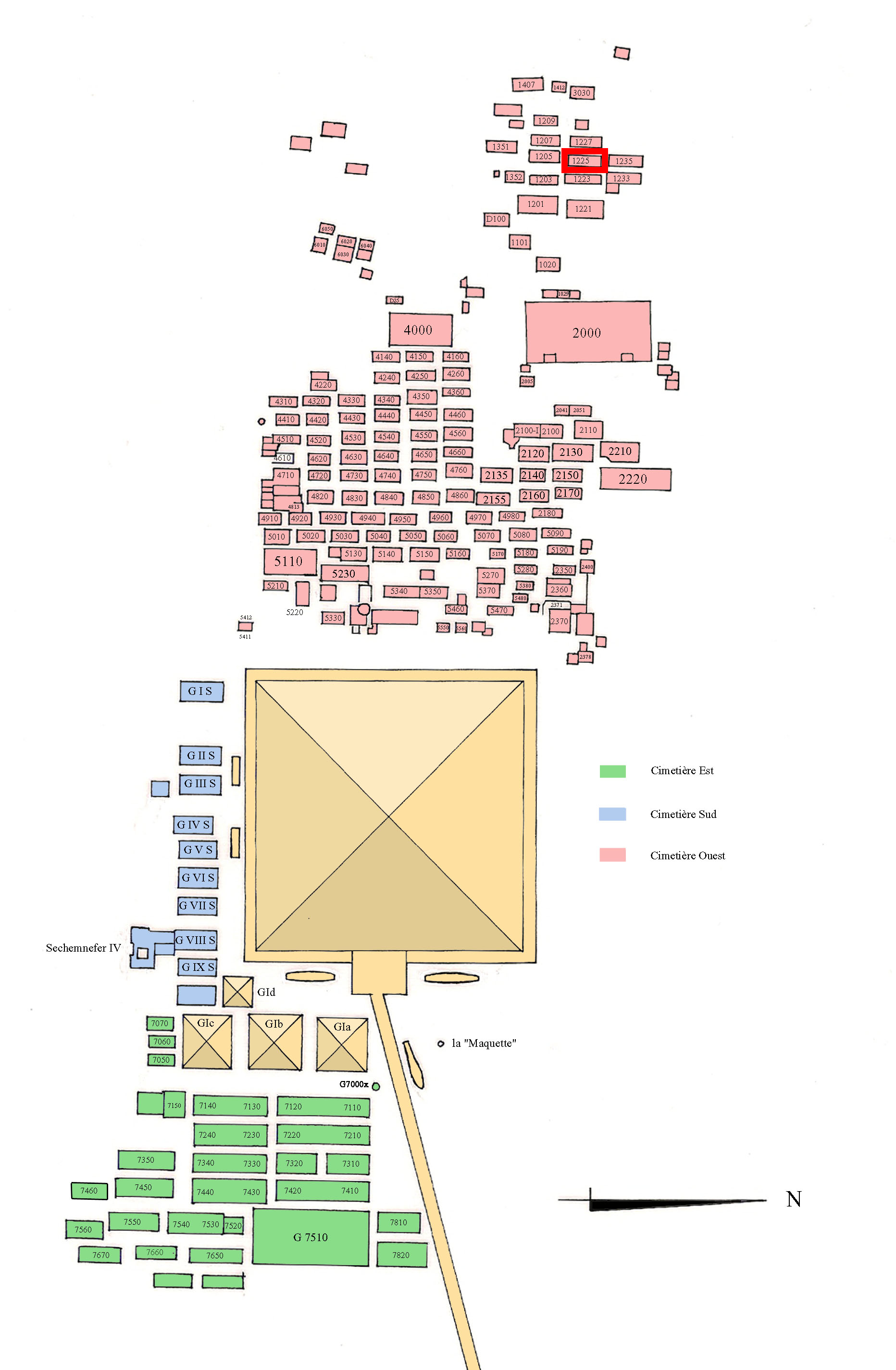
Pyramid G1-c is located near the east side(depicted in green) compared to the Great Pyramid of Giza as shown in the centre of the picture.

== See also ==
- Pyramid G1-a
- Pyramid G1-b
- Pyramid G1-d
