= Kanefer (Overseer of commissions) =

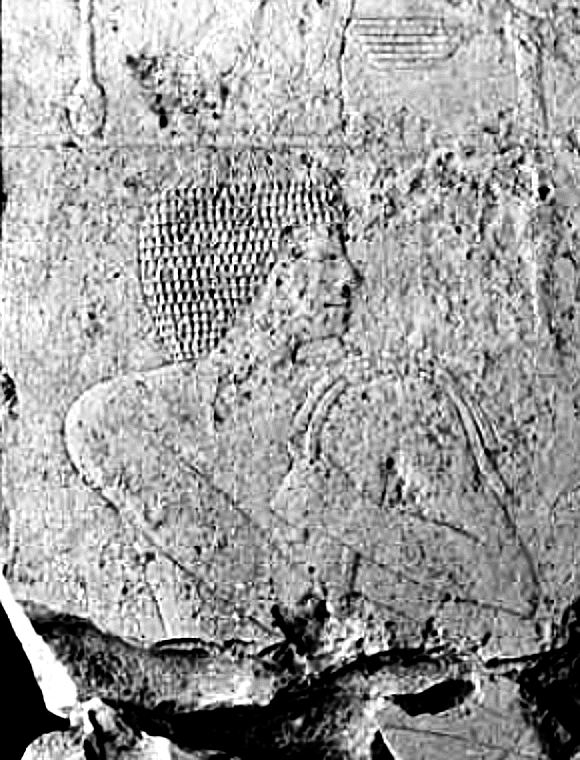
Kanefer seated, on his stela.

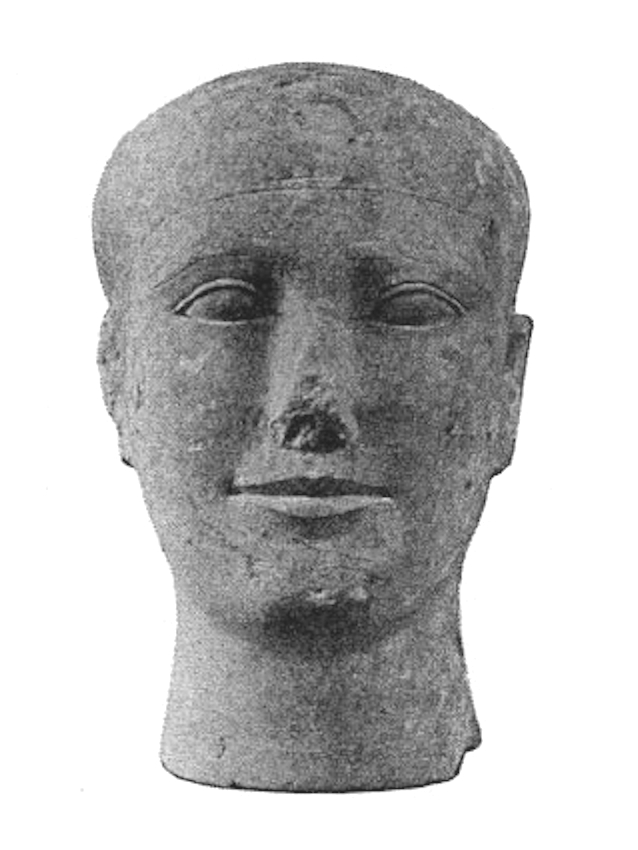
Reserve head of Kanefer from mastaba G 1203 in Giza.

Kanefer (Overseer of commissions) was an official during the Fourth Dynasty of Egypt. He is buried in mastaba G 1203 in the G1200 cemetery west of the Great Pyramid.

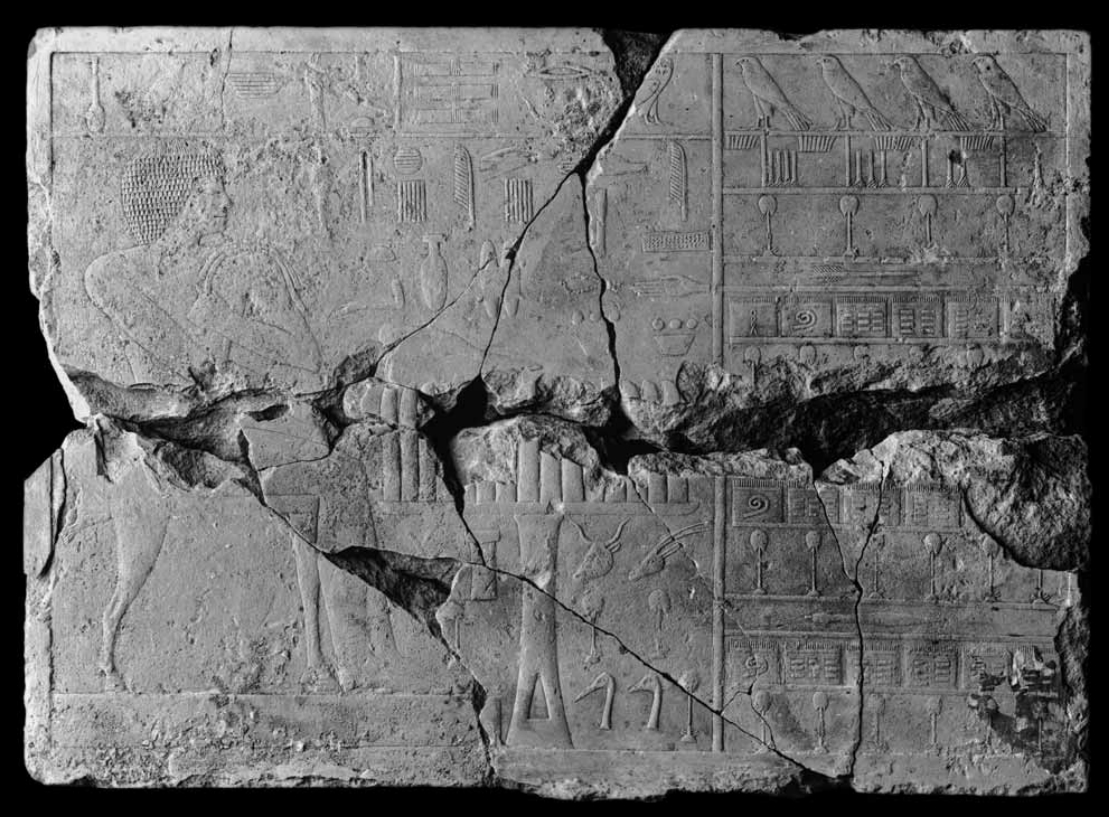
Kanefer stela.
