= Pyramid G1-b =

Subsidiary pyramid of the Great Pyramid of Giza

Pyramid of Buchanan (G1-B)
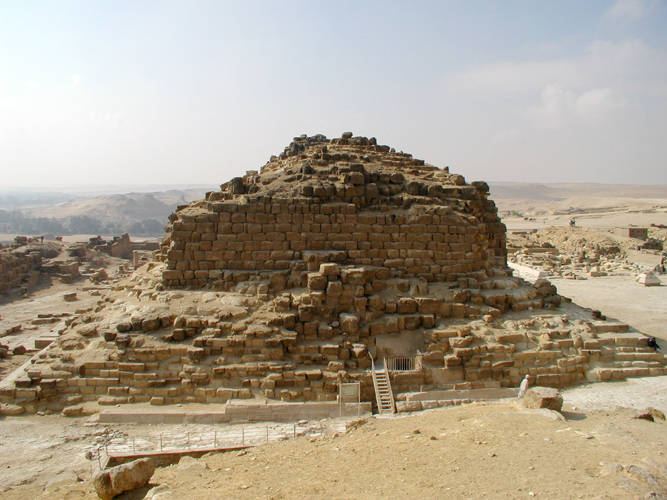
- The pyramid in 2007

- Location of pyramid in Egypt
- 29°58′42″N 31°8′10″E
- Owner: Meritites I or unknown consort of Khufu
- Ancient name: G1-a
- Constructed: c. 2575 BC
- Type: True pyramid
- Height: 30 meters (original)
- Base: 50 metres (160 ft)

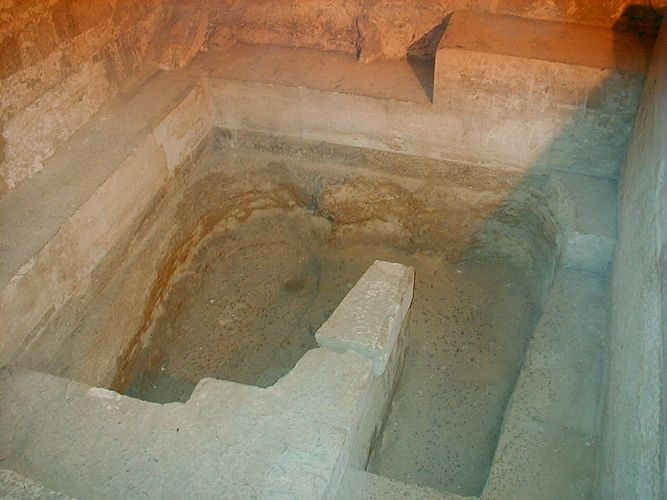
Interior of Pyramid G1-b

G1-b is one of the subsidiary pyramids of the Giza East Field of the Giza Necropolis immediately to the eastern side of the Great Pyramid of Giza, built during the Fourth Dynasty of Egypt. It is the central of the three pyramids of the queens, located ten meters south of the Pyramid G1-a. It has a base of 50 meters and had an original height of 30 meters. Egyptologists Mark Lehner and Rainer Stadelmann attribute it to the queen Meritites I. Zahi Hawass, however, suggests it might be attributed to an unknown Queen of Khufu, who gave birth to Djedefre. It is one of the queen pyramids near the Great Pyramid of Giza along with the other two queen pyramids Pyramid G1-a and Pyramid G1-c, along with another smaller pyramid called Pyramid G1-d.

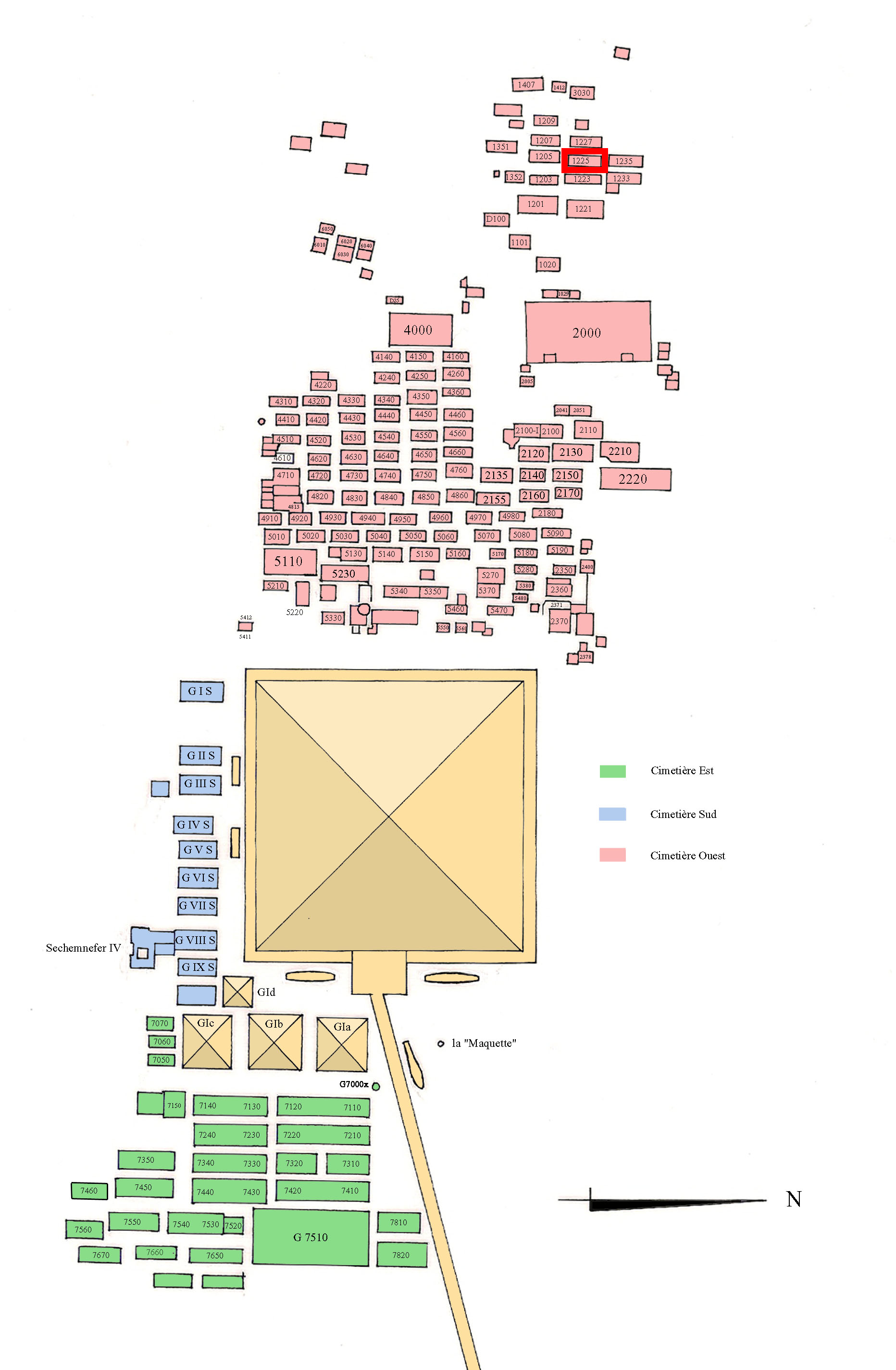
Pyramid G1-b is located near the east side(depicted in green) compared to the Great Pyramid of Giza as shown in the centre of the picture.

== See also ==
- Pyramid G1-a
- Pyramid G1-c
- Pyramid G1-d
- List of Egyptian pyramids
