= Mark Lehner =

American archaeologist (born 1950)

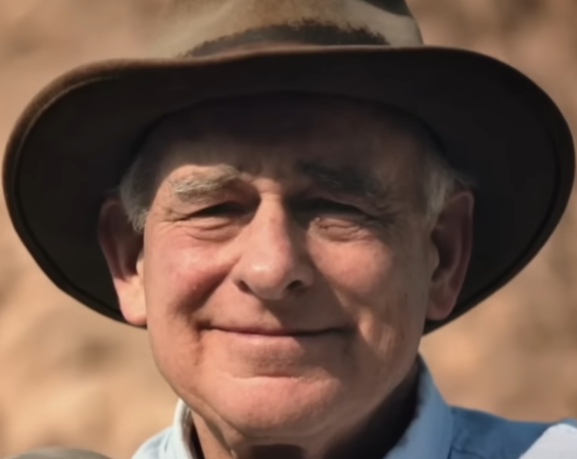

Mark Lehner (born 1950 in Dakota) is an American archaeologist with more than 30 years of experience excavating in Egypt. He is the director of Ancient Egypt Research Associates (AERA) and has appeared in numerous television documentaries.

His international team currently runs the Giza Plateau Mapping Project, excavating and mapping the ancient city of the builders of the Giza pyramid complex, which dates to the fourth dynasty of Egypt. He discovered that Pyramid G1-a, one of the subsidiary pyramids of the Great Pyramid, belonged to Hetepheres I; it was originally thought to belong to Queen Meritites I.

== Education and career ==
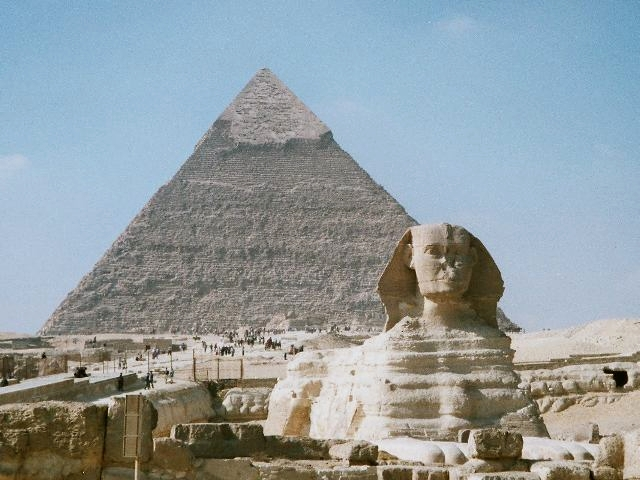
The Great Sphinx in Egypt

Lehner first went to Egypt as a student in the 1970s. Intrigued by the mysteries of the "Sleeping Prophet", Edgar Cayce, Lehner "found that [my] initial notions about the ancient civilization along the Nile could not stand up to the bedrock reality of the Giza Plateau". He turned to the scientific method of discovery in order to understand the culture better, returning some years later to complete a doctoral degree at Yale University. Lehner's 1991 dissertation was titled Archaeology of an image: The Great Sphinx of Giza.

Lehner's team has more recently included parts of Menkaure's valley temple and the town attached to the monument of Queen Khentkawes in their excavations. AERA's 2009 field season was recorded in a blog. AERA has conducted a number of archaeological field schools for Egyptian antiquities inspectors under the auspices of Egypt's Supreme Council of Antiquities. The AERA team has run basic and advanced courses at Giza, as well as courses in salvage archaeology along the Avenue of Sphinxes north of Luxor Temple in the city of Luxor.

Among his other work in Egypt, Lehner has produced the only known scale maps of the Great Sphinx.

Lehner's book, "The Complete Pyramids" (1997), is an exhaustive catalogue of Egypt's many pyramid sites. He has appeared in many television programs about Ancient Egypt. He is a visiting assistant professor of Egyptian archaeology at the Oriental Institute of the University of Chicago.

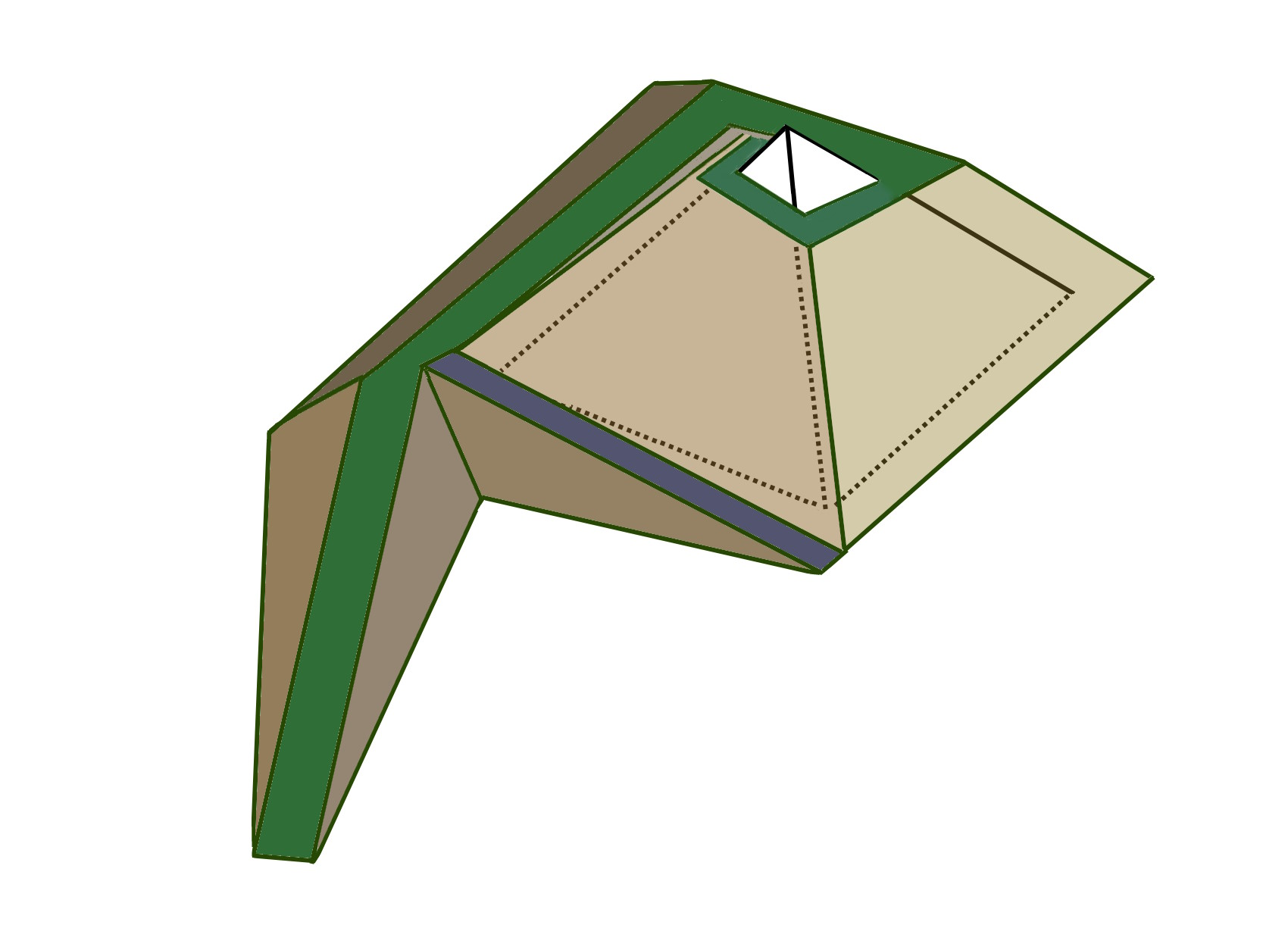
Ramp model by Mark Lehner

In 1985, he published a proposal for building the Great Pyramid using two ramps. The outer ramp starts in the south at the quarries and leads to the southwest corner of the pyramid. The second ramp starts at the southeast corner and flows into the outer ramp. From the junction point, the ramp spirals upwards.

Lehner took part in a heated American Association for the Advancement of Science debate in 1992 on the age of the Sphinx at Giza which "spilled over to a news conference and then a hallway confrontation".

Lehner has also featured and aided in the production of several documentaries about the pyramids which are regularly aired on the National Geographic Channel.

His conclusions drawn from radiocarbon dating projects in 1984 (funded by "friends and supporters of the Edgar Cayce Foundation") and 1994/95 ('The David H. Koch Pyramids Radiocarbon Project') that tested on "tiny pieces of [wood and wood charcoal], along with reed and straw left by the ancient builders" was that the Giza Necropolis was built in a span of 85 years between 2589 and 2504 BC.

== Television credits ==
=== Crew ===
- Into the Great Pyramid (2002) (TV) (consultant: archaeology)
- Mysteries of Egypt (1998) (scientific consultant)
- Saving the Sphinx (1998) (TV) (historical consultant)

=== Appearances ===
- Pyramides: Les Mystères Révélés (2019) (TV)
- Secret History Of The Sphinx (2017) (TV)
- Riddles of the Sphinx (2010) (TV)
- Heritage Key: Pyramid Builders (2009) (TV)
- Into the Great Pyramid (2002) (TV)
- Secrets of the Pharaohs: Lost City of the Pyramids (2001) (TV)
- Saving the Sphinx (1998) (TV)
- Egypt: Secrets of the Pharaohs (1997) (TV)
- Mummies: Tales from the Egyptian Crypts (1996) (TV)
- The Mystery of the Sphinx (1993) (TV)
- This Old Pyramid (1992) (TV)
- Mysteries of the Pyramids, LIVE (1988) (TV)

== Works ==
- The Egyptian Heritage: Based on the Edgar Cayce Readings. Virginia Beach: A.R.E. Press, 1974. ISBN 0-87604-071-7
- The Complete Pyramids. Slovenia: Thames and Hudson, 1997. ISBN 0-500-05084-8
- Giza Plateau Mapping Project: Season 2008: Preliminary Report. Ancient Egypt Research Associates (AERA), 2008.
- "10, 20, 30 years: Mark Lehner Reflects on a Career Giza in Archeology". AERAgram, vol. 10, no.1 (Spring 2009), pp. 2-6.
- Giza and the Pyramids: The Definitive Story. Chicago: University of Chicago Press, 2017.
- The Red Sea Scrolls: How Ancient Papyri Reveal the Secrets of the Pyramids. London: Thames and Hudson, 2022.
