= Pyramid G1-d =

Subsidiary pyramid of the Great Pyramid of Giza

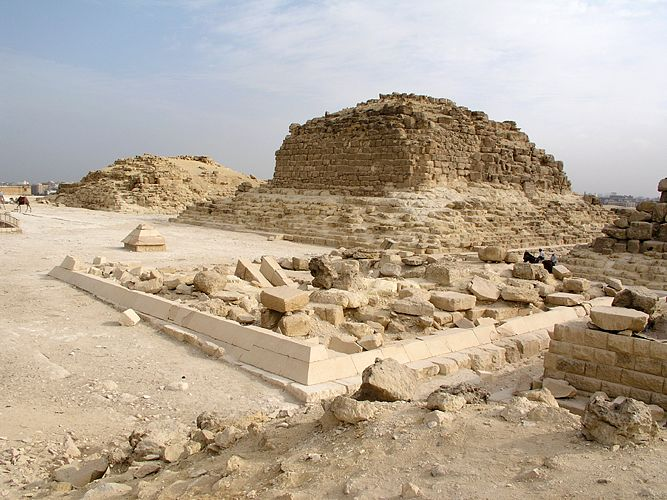
- The pyramid in 2007

- Location of pyramid in Egypt
- 29°58′41.1″N 31°8′8.7″E
- Owner: Khufu
- Constructed: c. 2600 BC
- Type: True Pyramid
- Height: 13.8 meters (original)
- Base: 21.75 meters (original)

Pyramid G1-d (also known as 'G1d', 'GI-d', 'GId' or 'G Id') is a satellite pyramid within the Khufu pyramid complex on the Giza plateau.

The pyramid was discovered in 1992, during work to remove a road, about 25 metres (82 ft) east-southeast of the southeast corner of the Great Pyramid (G1), and about 7 metres (23 ft) west of the subsidiary pyramids G1-b and G1-c.

== Superstructure ==
The pyramid's original base length was 21.75 metres (71.4 ft), with a height of 13.8 metres (45 ft). Joseph Dorner established the mean slope to be about 51°45', very similar to that of the Great Pyramid. This equates to a seked of 5 palms and 2 fingers, a ratio of 28 rise to 22 run.

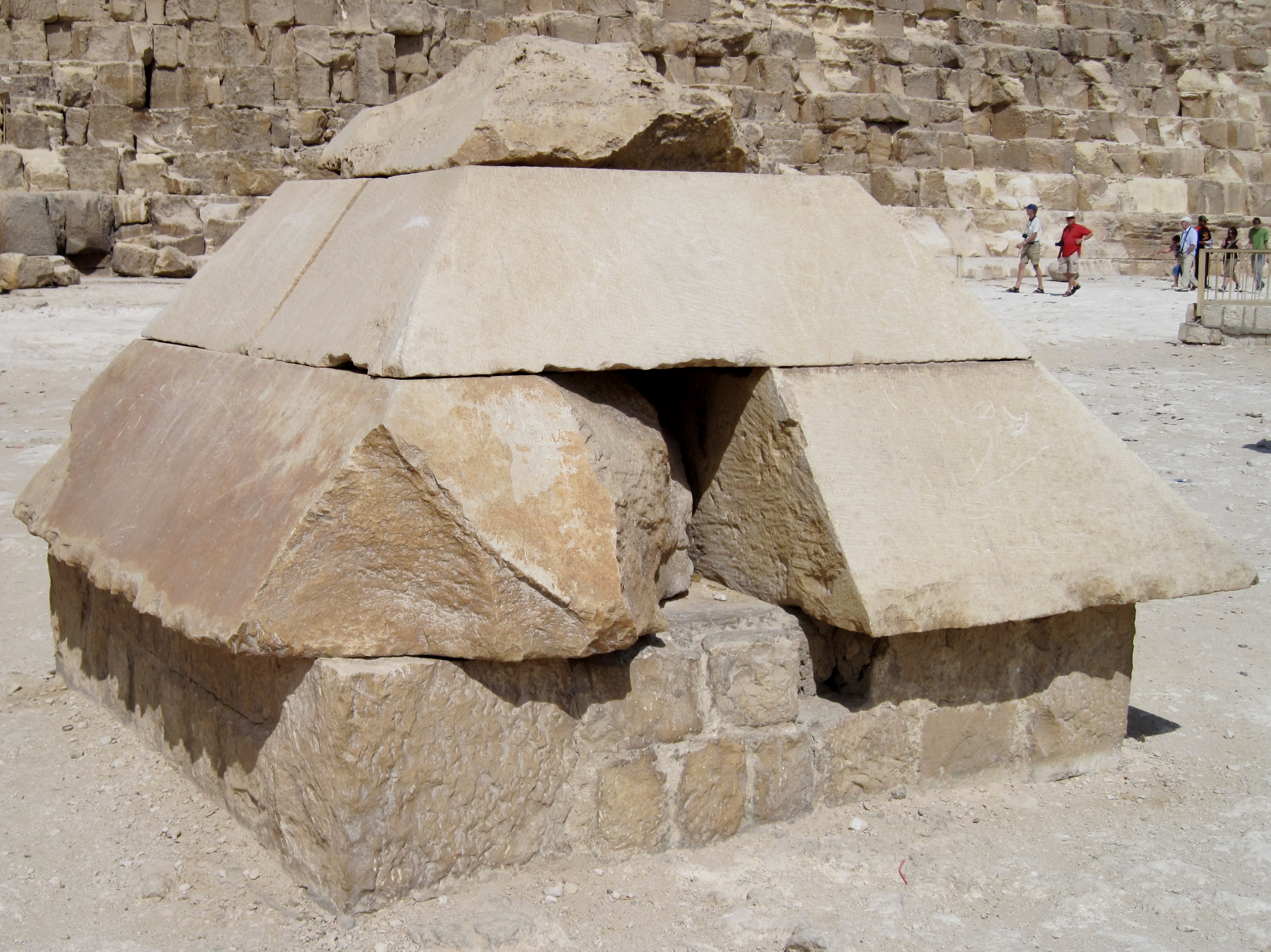
Reconstructed apex of G1-d. The pyramidion and one block of the 3rd course from the top are original.

The pyramid was likely dismantled by the Emir Karakoush of the Ayyubid Sultanate (serving in the 12th century under Saladin), who used the structure's stone for other construction projects.

The blocks that remained in situ surrounded the substructure in a U-shape. The bedrock below the pyramid slopes downward to the east and south, hence a layer of foundation stones was placed to form an even base.

One of the core blocks of the south side was inscribed in red paint on the inside surface. The notation says, "imy rsy s3". This graffito, meaning "on the south (back) side", probably instructed the stone movers where to place the block.

Multiple casing blocks were found out of position, scattered around the pyramid. One of these, slanted on three sides, was one of a pair of blocks that once formed the third course from the top. It is 2.7 metres (8.9 ft) long and 0.56 metres (1.8 ft) thick, and its top side is hollowed, to hold the convex underside of the stone(s) placed above it.

No stones of the second course from the top remained, yet in 1993, the actual pyramidion was discovered accidentally, north of the pyramid, by assistant Alla el-Din Shaat. Its underside is faceted, four triangles forming a shallow downward pyramid. It is the second oldest capstone of a pyramid ever found; the earliest belonged to the Red Pyramid of Sneferu at Dahshur.

The top three courses were reconstructed by Miss Nivien Mohamed Mustafa, four metres north of the pyramid. The foundation and parts of the first course of the pyramid were restored as well, with newly carved limestone blocks.

== Substructure ==
The substructure consists of an inclined passage of 25–28° which runs north to south. It starts 3.75 metres (12.3 ft) inwards from the pyramid's base line, indicating that the original entrance lay somewhat above the ground level on the north face.

This corridor, two cubits (1.05 metres (3.4 ft)) wide, runs for a length of 10 cubits (5.25 metres (17.2 ft)), until it terminates 0.55 metres (1.8 ft) above the floor of a chamber extending to the east and west. Together they form a T-shaped structure that matches satellite pyramids subsequent to this one.

A distinct cutting in the chamber floor at its entrance may have held a plugging stone. Alternatively, it may have held an angled stone which continued the ramp down to the chamber floor.

The floor measures about 15 by 6.5 cubits, or 7.92 metres (26.0 ft) long (east to west) by 3.4 metres (11 ft). Traces of mortar hint at a pavement now missing.

The walls of the chamber were not smoothed or polished, and are slightly inclined, narrowing towards the former ceiling. Four small holes in opposing walls at the west end suggest that two beams spanned this end of the chamber. Hawass speculates that they could have been intended for lowering or covering an object.

== Purpose ==
The purpose of the pyramid is under debate by scholars. Some possible explanations are that it is for the king's ka, or it represents the king as the ruler of Upper and Lower Egypt, or it is for the viscera of the king, or it is a dummy room for the Sed festival, or it has a solar function. Zahi Hawass, who led the uncovering of the pyramid, believed that the satellite pyramid was used symbolically as a changing room for the Sed festival.

== See also ==
- Pyramid G1-a
- Pyramid G1-b
- Pyramid G1-c
- List of Egyptian pyramids
