= Pyramid G1-a =

Subsidiary pyramid of the Great Pyramid of Giza

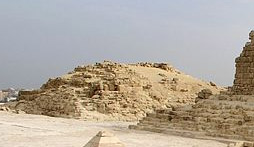
- The pyramid in 2007

- Location of pyramid in Egypt
- 29°58′43.81″N 31°8′10.54″E
- Owner: Hetepheres I
- Constructed: c. 2600 BC
- Type: True pyramid
- Height: 30.25 metres (99.2 ft)
- Base: 49.5 metres (162 ft)

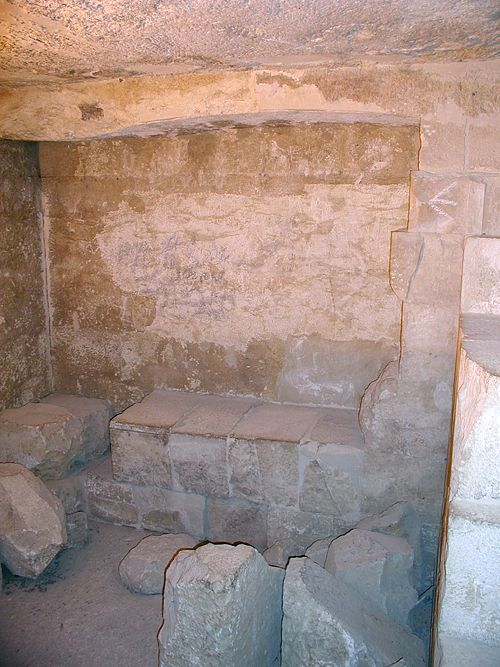
Interior of Pyramid G1-a

G1-a is one of the subsidiary pyramids of the Giza East Field of the Giza Necropolis, located immediately to the eastern side of the Great Pyramid of Giza. It was built during the Fourth Dynasty of Egypt. The tomb is the northernmost of the three pyramids of the queens.

== Structure ==
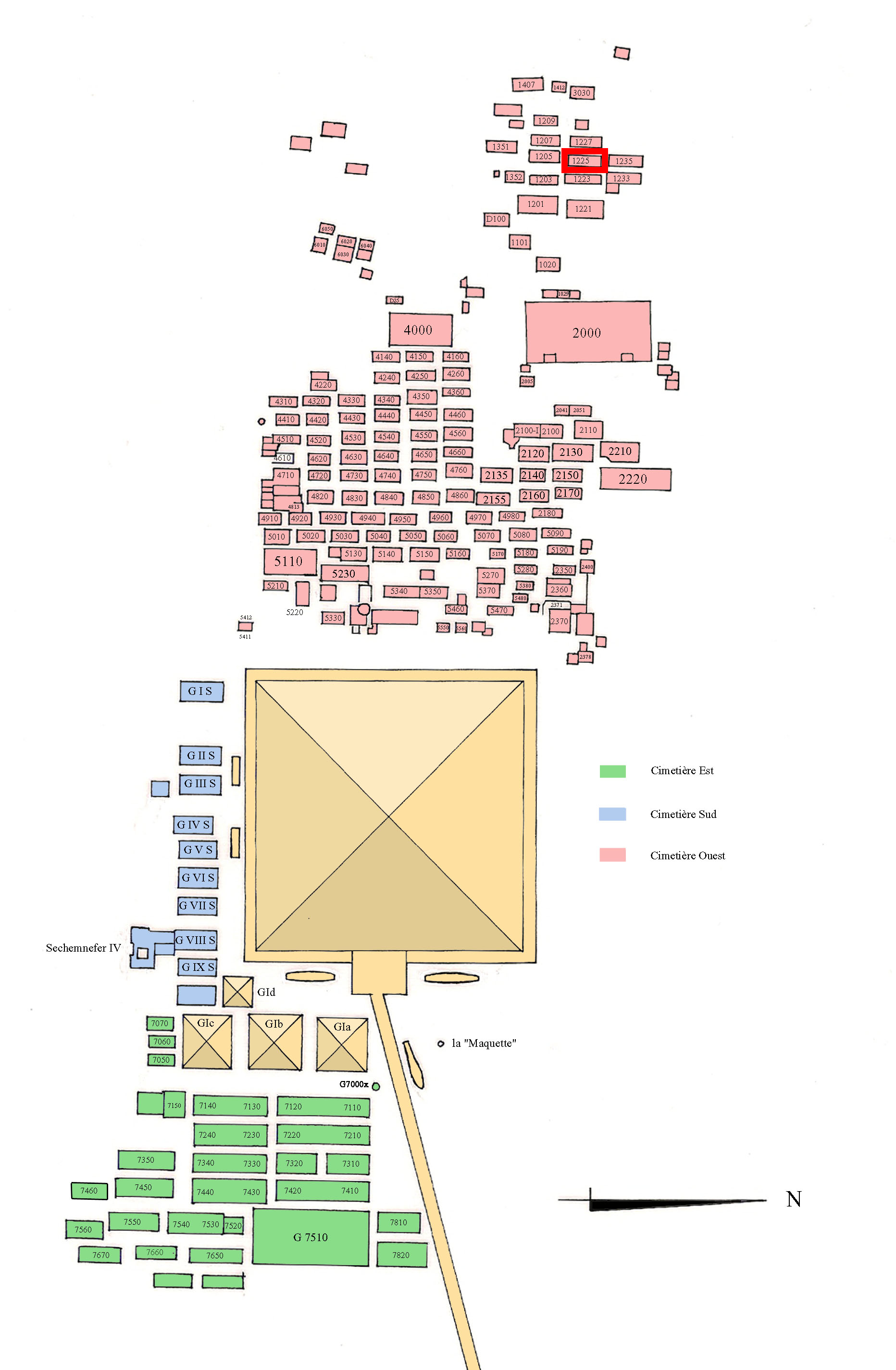
Pyramid G1-b is located near the east side(depicted in green) compared to the Great Pyramid of Giza as shown in the centre of the picture.

It has a base of 49.5 metres (162 ft) wide and originally a height of 30.25 metres (99.2 ft); the pyramid has lost two-thirds of its original height. In the west wall of the burial chamber a small niche was dug in which were found fragments of basalt. It is also known as the Pyramid of Hetepheres I as discovered by Mark Lehner; it was originally thought to belong to Queen Meritites I.

== See also ==
- Pyramid G1-b
- Pyramid G1-c
- Pyramid G1-d
- List of Egyptian pyramids
