= Meritites I =

Egyptian queen

Meritites in hieroglyphs
mr r t t f s
Meritites (Merit ites)
Mrj.t jt=s
Beloved of her father

Meritites I was an ancient Egyptian queen of the 4th Dynasty. Her name means "Beloved of her Father". Several of her titles are known from a stela found at Giza. She was buried in the middle Queen’s Pyramid in Giza (Pyramid G 1b).

Meritites was a daughter of King Sneferu and his consort of unknown name. Meritites married her (half?-)brother, King Khufu. With Khufu, she was the mother of the Crown Prince Kawab, and possibly Djedefre. Both Queen Hetepheres II and Pharaoh Khafre have been suggested as children of Meretites I and Khufu as well, and it is possible that Meritites II was a daughter of Meritites I as well.

Auguste Mariette recorded a stela at Giza in which Meritites is said to be a favorite of both Sneferu and Khufu:

King’s wife, his beloved, devoted to Horus, Mertitytes. King’s wife, his beloved, Mertitytes; beloved of the Favorite of the Two Goddesses; she who says anything whatsoever and it is done for her. Great in the favor of Snefr[u]; great in the favor of Khuf[u], devoted to Horus, honored under Khafre. Merti[tyt]es. [Breasted]

Meritites held the titles: "great one of the hetes-sceptre of Khufu" (Weret-hetes-net-Khufu, wrt-hetes-nt-khwfw), great one of the hetes-sceptre of Snofru (Weret-hetes-net-snofru, wrt-hetes-nt-snfrw), king’s wife, his beloved (Hemet-nesu Meritef, hmt-nsw meryt.f), attendant of Horus (Khet-heru, kht-hrw) and consort and beloved of the Two Ladies (Semayt-meri-nebti, smꜣyt-mry-nbty).

== Pyramid ==
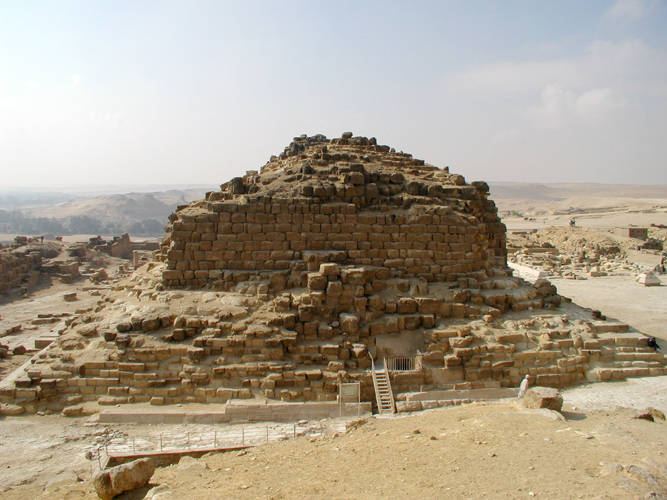
Queen's pyramid G1-b

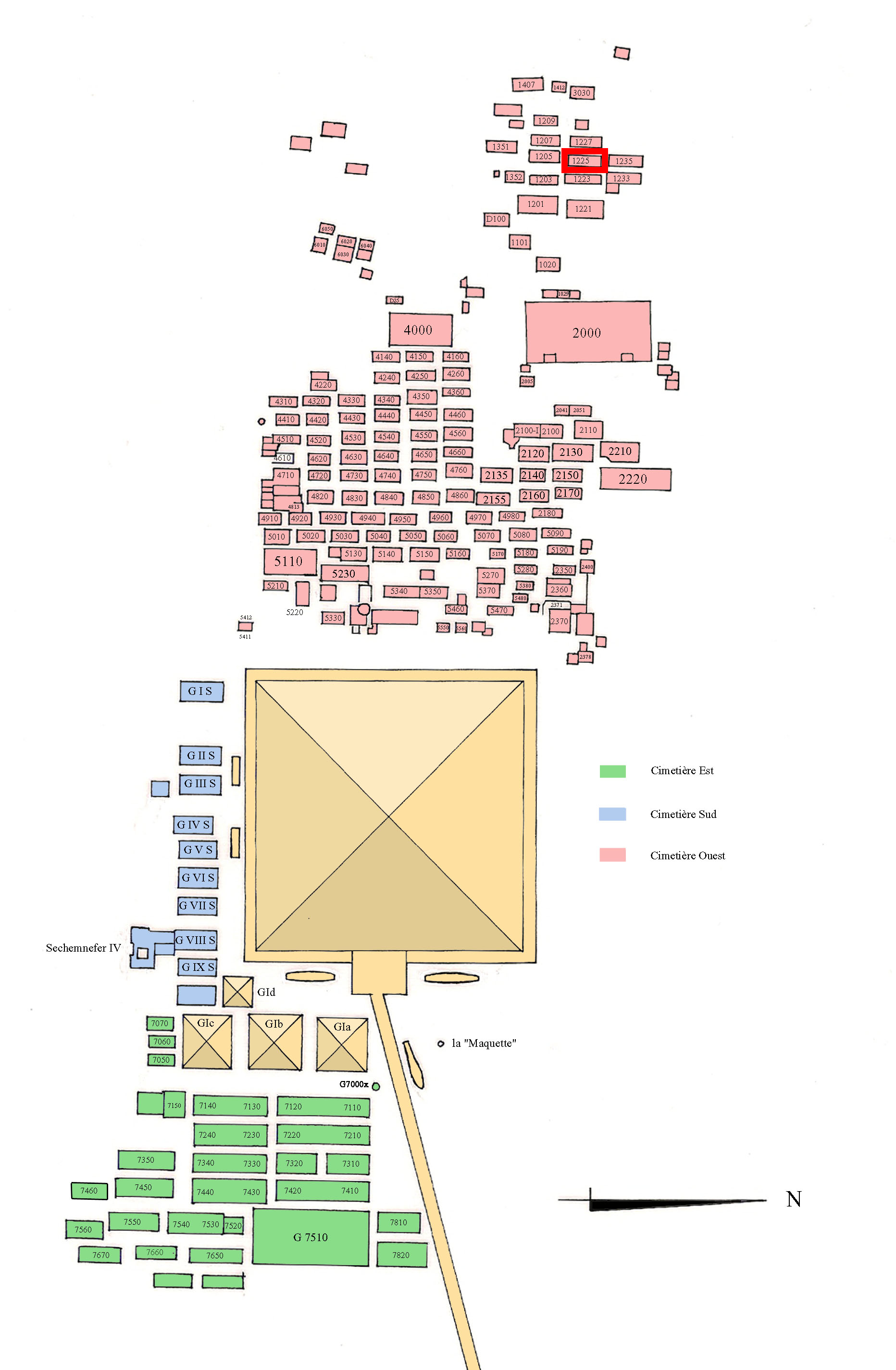
Pyramid G1-b is located near the east side(depicted in green) compared to the Great Pyramid of Giza as shown in the centre of the picture.

Pyramid G1-b is thought to be the tomb of Meritites. The queen's pyramids were often constructed to the south of the king's pyramid, but a quarry located to the south of Khufu's pyramid caused the location of the smaller pyramids to shift to the east. Reisner placed the construction of the pyramid of Meritites in circa year 15 of the reign of Khufu. The construction of her pyramid would have started very soon after the construction of Pyramid G1-a. The queen's pyramids are part of the East Field at Giza, which also includes some royal mastabas.

Pyramid G1-a (the northernmost of three small pyramids east of the Great Pyramid of Giza) was at first thought to belong to Meritites, but it is now thought to belong to Khufu’s mother, Hetepheres I. More recently, Pyramid G1-b is thought to be the tomb of Meritites. It had a small mortuary temple and a boat pit associated with it. No boat was found in the rock-cut boat pit however. The mortuary temple was decorated with scenes. Relief fragments from a false door and walls were recovered during excavations. The title of queen was preserved in a fragment now in the Museum of Fine Arts, Boston (27.1321). Further fragments include parts of an offering list, men bringing offerings and animals, and a boat being paddled.
