= Fourth Dynasty of Egypt =

Old Kingdom dynasty (c. 2613–2494 BC)

- c. 2613 BC–c. 2498 BC
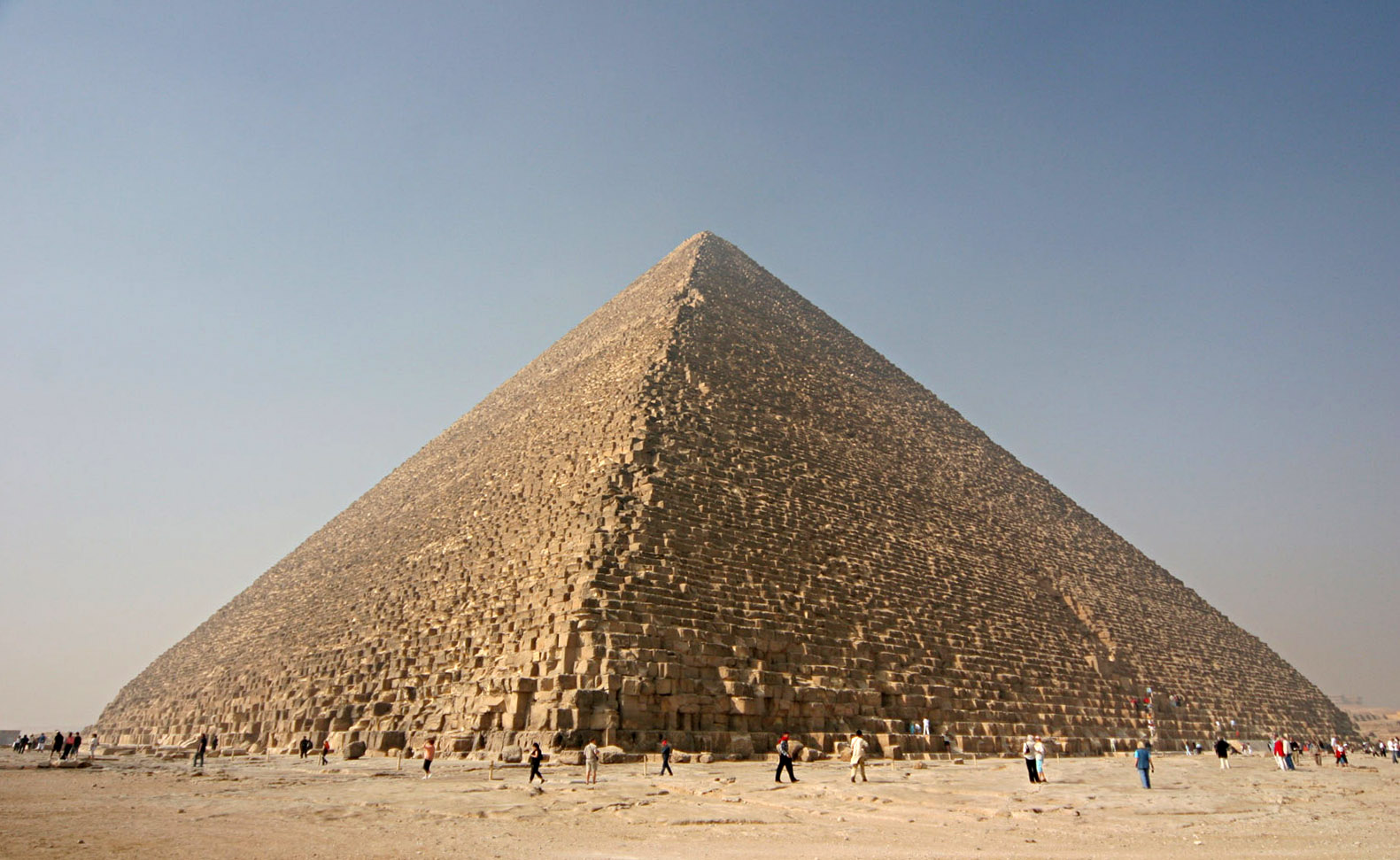
- The Great Pyramid of Giza, built by King Khufu ("Cheops"), c. 2600 BC
- Capital: Memphis
- Common languages: Egyptian language
- Religion: Ancient Egyptian religion
- Government: Absolute monarchy
- Monarch
  - c. 2613–c. 2589 BC (first): Sneferu
- Historical era: Bronze Age
  - Established: c. 2613 BC
  - Disestablished: c. 2498 BC
Preceded by	Succeeded by
Third Dynasty of Egypt	Fifth Dynasty of Egypt

The Fourth Dynasty of ancient Egypt (notated Dynasty IV) is characterized as a "golden age" of the Old Kingdom of Egypt. Dynasty IV lasted from c. 2613 to c. 2498 BC. It was a time of peace and prosperity as well as one during which trade with other countries is officially documented.

The Fourth Dynasty heralded the height of the pyramid-building age. The peaceful rule of the Third Dynasty allowed artistic expressions to flourish. Building experiments done by King Sneferu led to the evolution of mastaba tombs into the smooth-sided pyramids like those seen on the Giza Plateau. According to some historians, no other period in Egyptian history equaled the accomplishments achieved during the Fourth Dynasty.

== Rulers ==
Dynasty IV monarchs
Personal Name	Horus-name	Image	Reign	Pyramid	Spouse(s)
Sneferu "Soris"	Nebma'at		c. 2613 – c. 2589 BC	Red Pyramid; Bent Pyramid; Pyramid at Meidum	Hetepheres I
Khufu "Cheops"	Medjedu		c. 2589 – c. 2566 BC	Great Pyramid of Giza	Meritites I Henutsen
Djedefre "Ratoises"	Kheper		c. 2566 – c. 2558 BC	Pyramid of Djedefre	Hetepheres II; Khentetka
Khafre "Chephren"	Userib		c. 2558 – c. 2532 BC	Pyramid of Khafre	Meresankh III; Khamerernebty I Hekenuhedjet
Bikheris (Possibly Bakare or Baufre)			c. 2570 BC	Possibly Unfinished Northern Pyramid of Zawyet El Aryan	
Menkaure "Mycerinus"	Kakhet		c. 2532 – c. 2503 BC	Pyramid of Menkaure	
Shepseskaf	Shepsesket		c. 2503 – c. 2498 BC	Mastabat al-Fir'aun	
Thampthis (Possibly Djedefptah or Djedefkaf, Existence disputed)			c. 2500 BC		

== Summary of listed kings ==
=== Sneferu ===
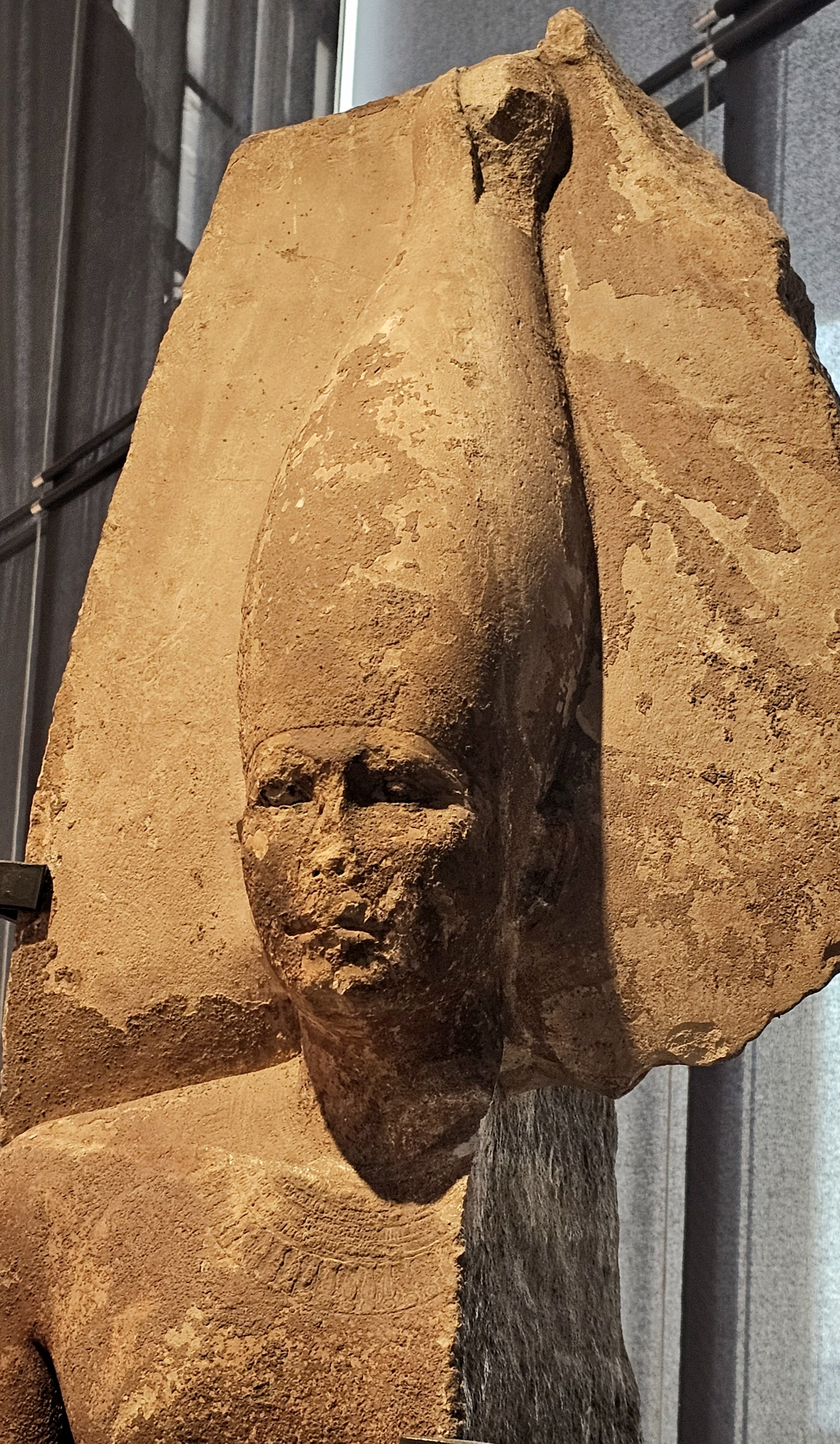
Statue of Sneferu, Cairo Museum

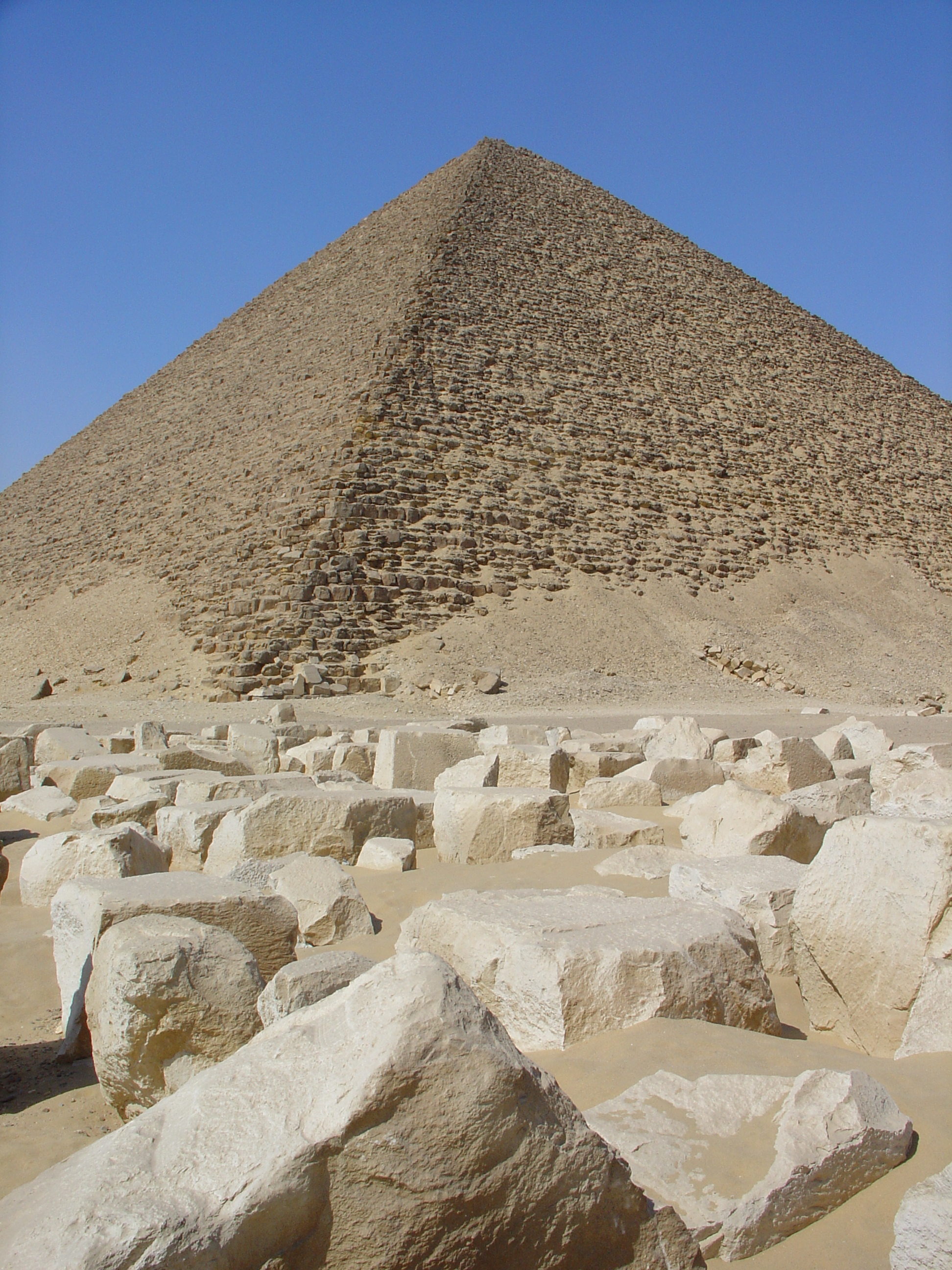
The Red Pyramid of Sneferu, Dahshur, Egypt's first "true" smooth-sided pyramid

Sneferu, lauded as "Bringer of Beauty", "Master of All Justice", and "Ruler of Lower and Upper Nile", was the first pharaoh of the fourth dynasty. He descended from a family in Middle Egypt that lived near the city of Hermopolis, and most likely ascended to the throne by marrying a royal heiress. There is still debate as to who his father was, with the credit often being given to Huni, but this cannot be confirmed due to the break in dynasties. His mother, Meresankh I was either a lesser wife or concubine of Huni.

Until his reign, Egyptian kings were thought to be worldly incarnations of Horus, obtaining total deification exclusively in death. Sneferu was the first king to proclaim that he was the embodiment of Ra, a sun deity.

Sneferu built the Bent Pyramid, imitating King Djoser's tomb, approximately 150 years later. The Red Pyramid is considered to be the first of the "true" pyramids built by Sneferu and earned the name due to its red coloration from the limestone used. Sneferu is attributed to constructing the Meidum pyramid, likely for the last king of the Third Dynasty, Huni.

Sneferu may also be responsible for a series of pyramids built in Selia, though no evidence dictates exactly who built them. He did commission a total of three pyramids during his reign.

Many of Snerferu's political expeditions were to other countries to secure two things: a substantial labor force, through slavery, and access to a large store of building materials. He frequently traveled to Nubia and Libya for these. The excursions into Nubia and Libya allowed an extensive labor force to accumulate requiring vast amounts of food sources in order to maintain.

=== Khufu ===
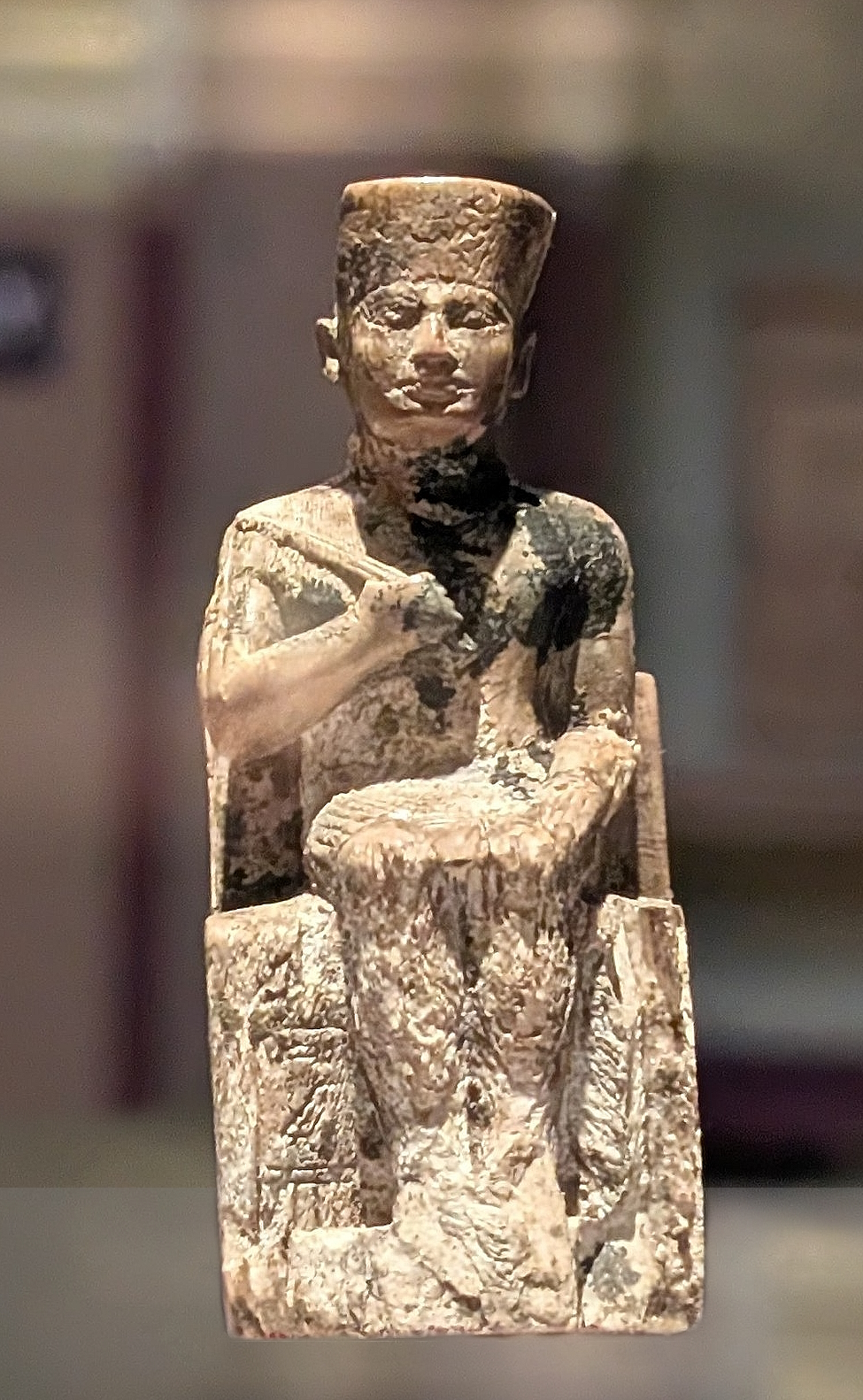
Statue of Khufu/Cheops, Cairo Museum.

Khufu, known to the Greek as Cheops, and Sneferu's successor—though it is unclear whether he was the biological son of Sneferu—was a widely known king. He is still very well known in present-day media, being featured in movies, novels, and television shows. His fame stems from his pyramid on the northeastern plateau at Giza, where he was buried. His mortuary temple was built on the northern end of the pyramid, which is no longer accessible due to grave robbers ravaging the area.

Only three-dimensional reliefs have been recovered and have lasted into modern day, including many limestone busts and clay figurines. Khufu's activities in and out of Egypt are not well documented, with the exception of his architecture. The Ancient Greeks remain some of the only texts referencing Khufu, through which they viewed him as a cruel and wicked man who offended the deities and forced his subjects into slavery.

Khufu, as the son of Sneferu, was believed to be illegitimate and therefore unworthy of the throne. Even if he was Sneferu's true son, he did very little to expand the country of Egypt and failed to follow his father's footsteps of territorial gains.

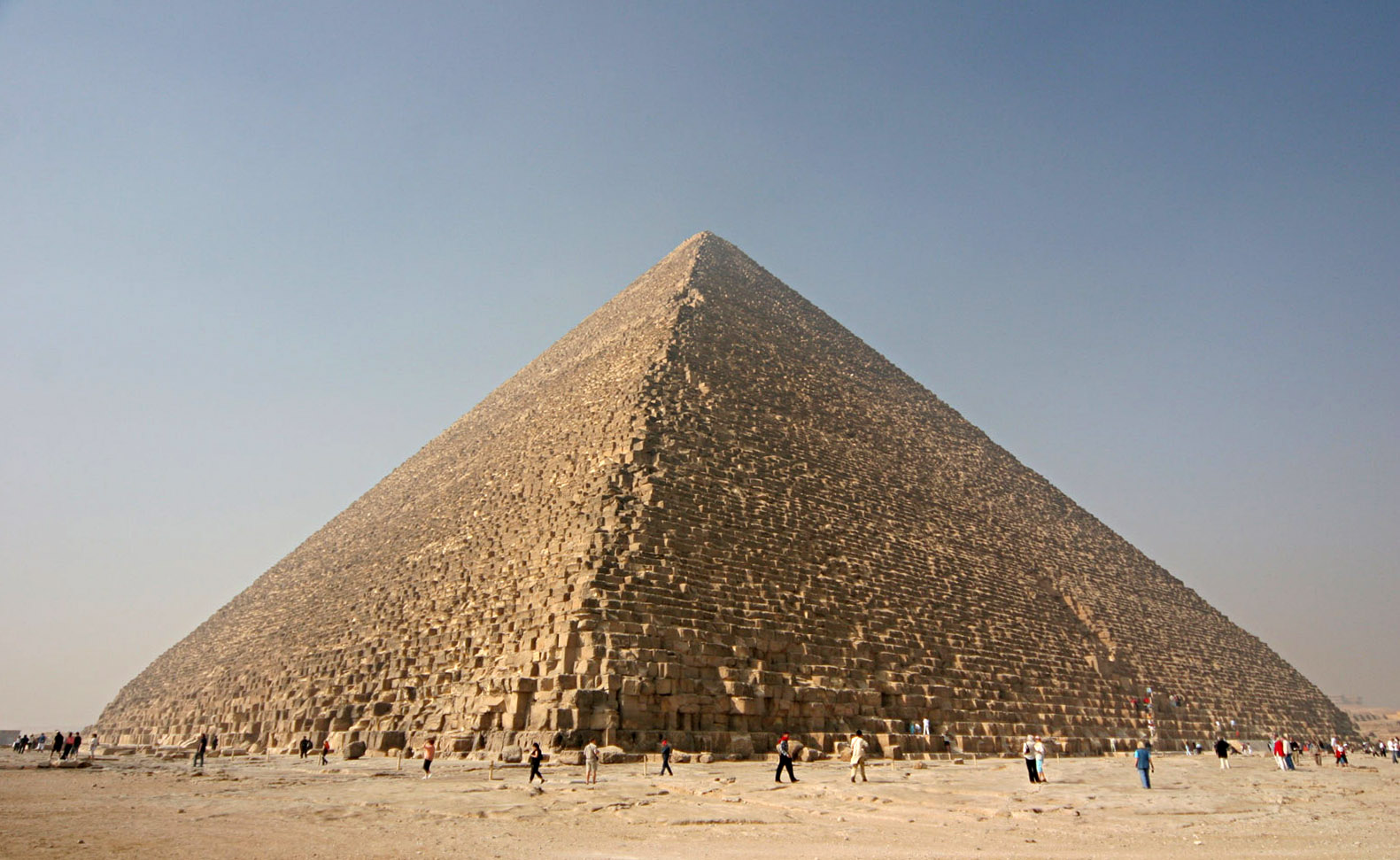
King Khufu built The Great Pyramid of Giza

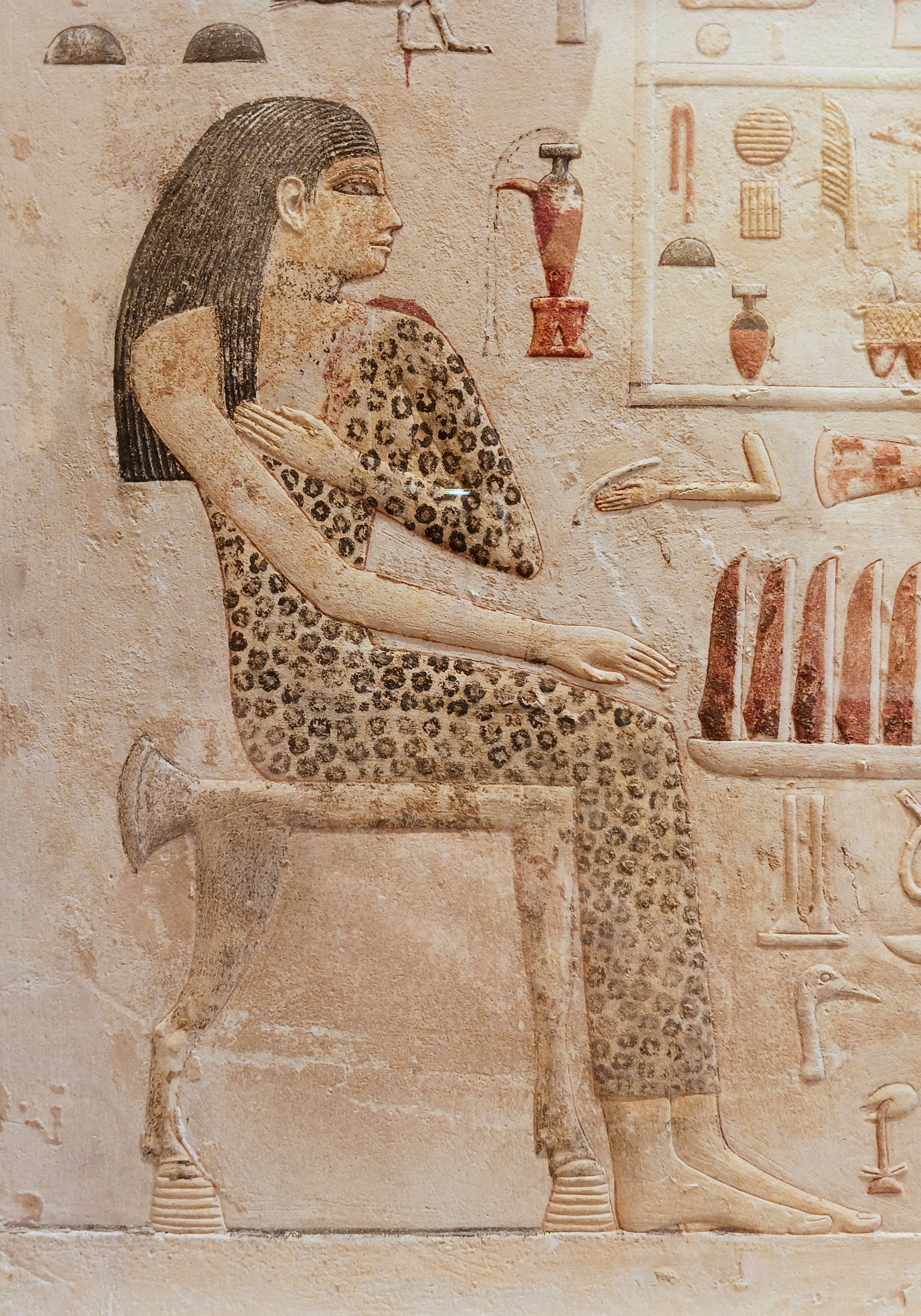
Princess Nefertiabet, likely sister of Khufu, from her Giza tomb. Dated c. 2580 BC. Louvre Museum E 15591

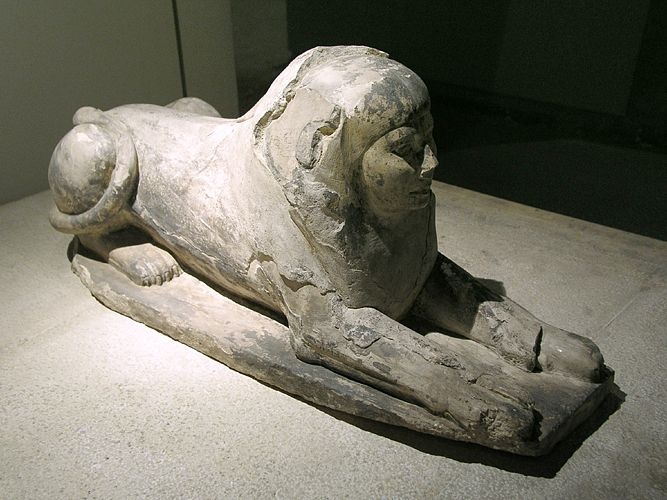
Painted limestone Sphinx of Hetepheres II, a daughter of Khufu, possibly the first depiction of a sphinx

=== Djedefre ===
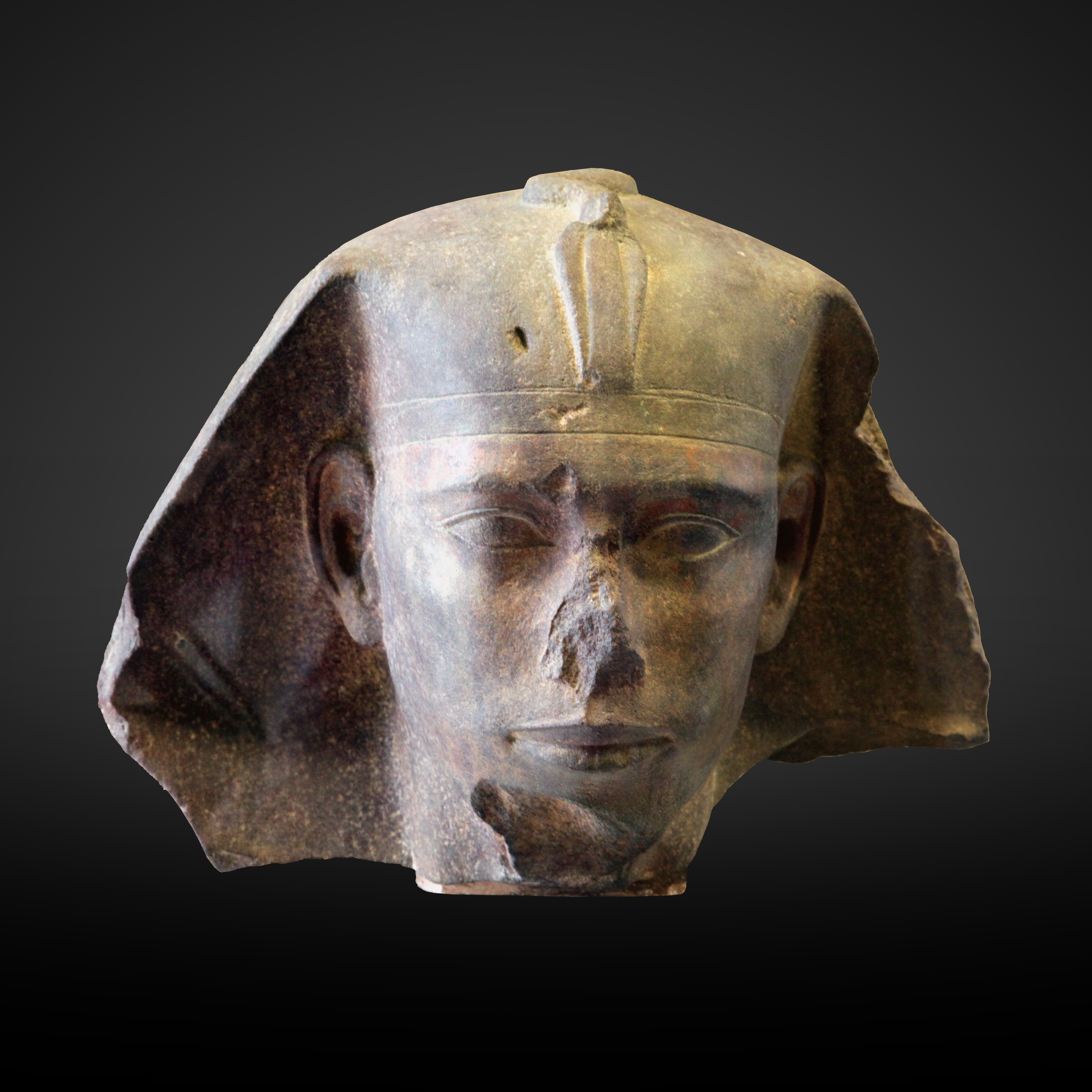
Bust of Djedefre, taken from a sphinx statue

Djedefre is credited by historians with a reign of eight years. Not much is known of Djedefre, including his inconclusive lineage. It is possible that he is Khufu's son or that he was Khufu's brother. It is widely suggested that he is the son of a lesser queen who murdered the rightful heir to the throne and Djedefre's half brother, the crown prince Kawab.

Djedefre chose to build his pyramid several kilometers north of Giza, creating speculation that there was a family feud that caused him to want to be far away from Khufu's tomb. A more favorable conclusion was that Djedefre chose to be buried closer to Iunu, the center of the cult of Ra.

His pyramid also features a statue of his wife, Hetepheres II, in the form of a sphinx. She was a daughter of Khufu and had been the wife of Kawab. It is sometimes suggested that this was the first true sphinx, although there is debate about the sphinx at Giza that was credited to Khafre. She became the longest living royal member of the dynasty, living into the reign of Shepseskaf.

=== Khafre ===
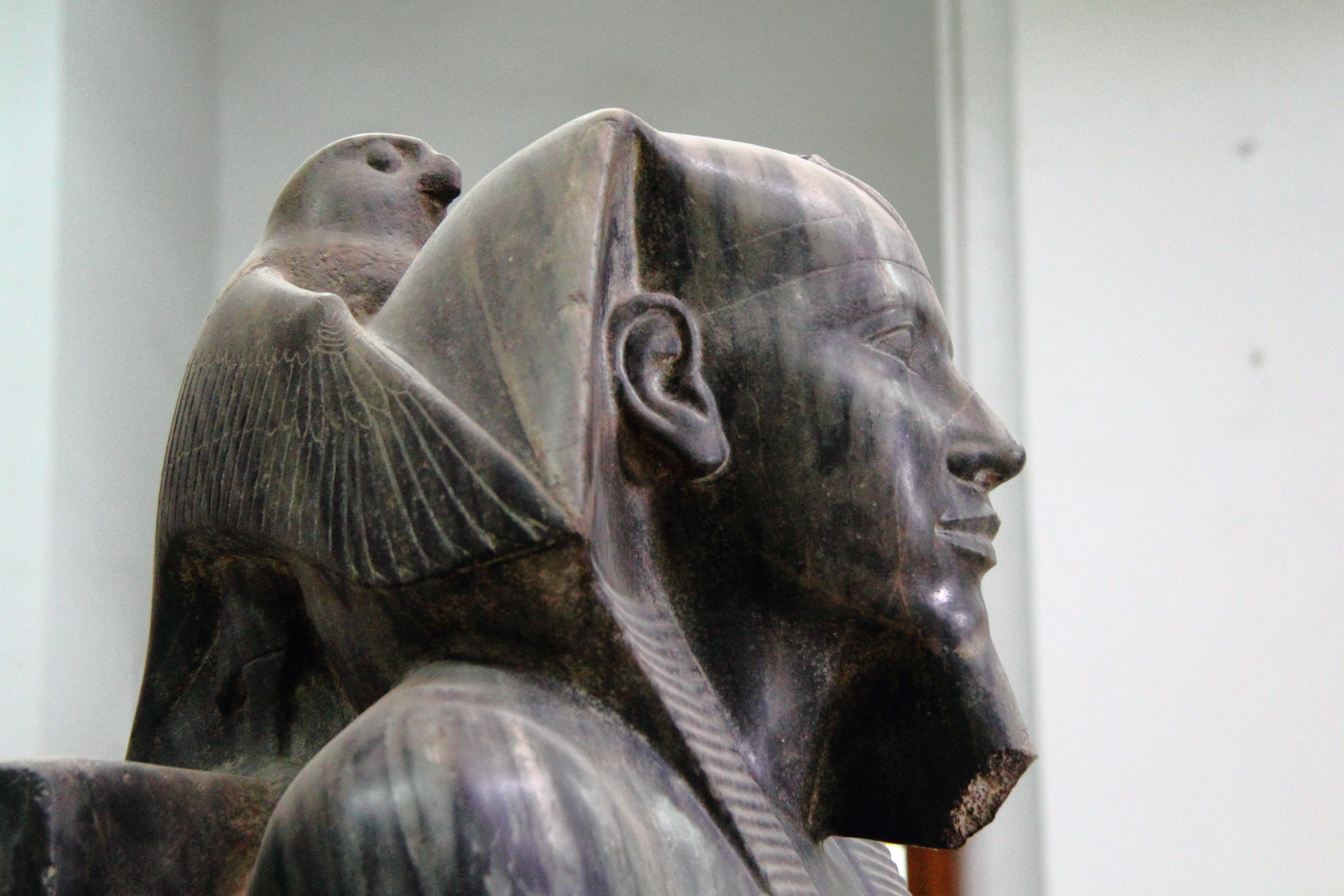
Khafre depicted with Horus

Khafre, son of Khufu, succeeded his supposed brother, Djedefre, after his short reign. He chose to build his pyramid close to his father, matching it in style and being almost as large. At the front of the pyramid causeway lies the Great Sphinx that is said to bear his features. There is still debate on whether his Sphinx was erected before Djedefre's. Khafre's sphinx was well-known and closer to his subjects, making it harder to determine which was built first due to biased record keeping.

Khafre built the most statues for Dynasty IV, leading to greater evidence of his 25 year long rule. He did cause controversy however, with his statue depicting his ties still to the god Horus, rather than Ra.

=== Menkaure ===
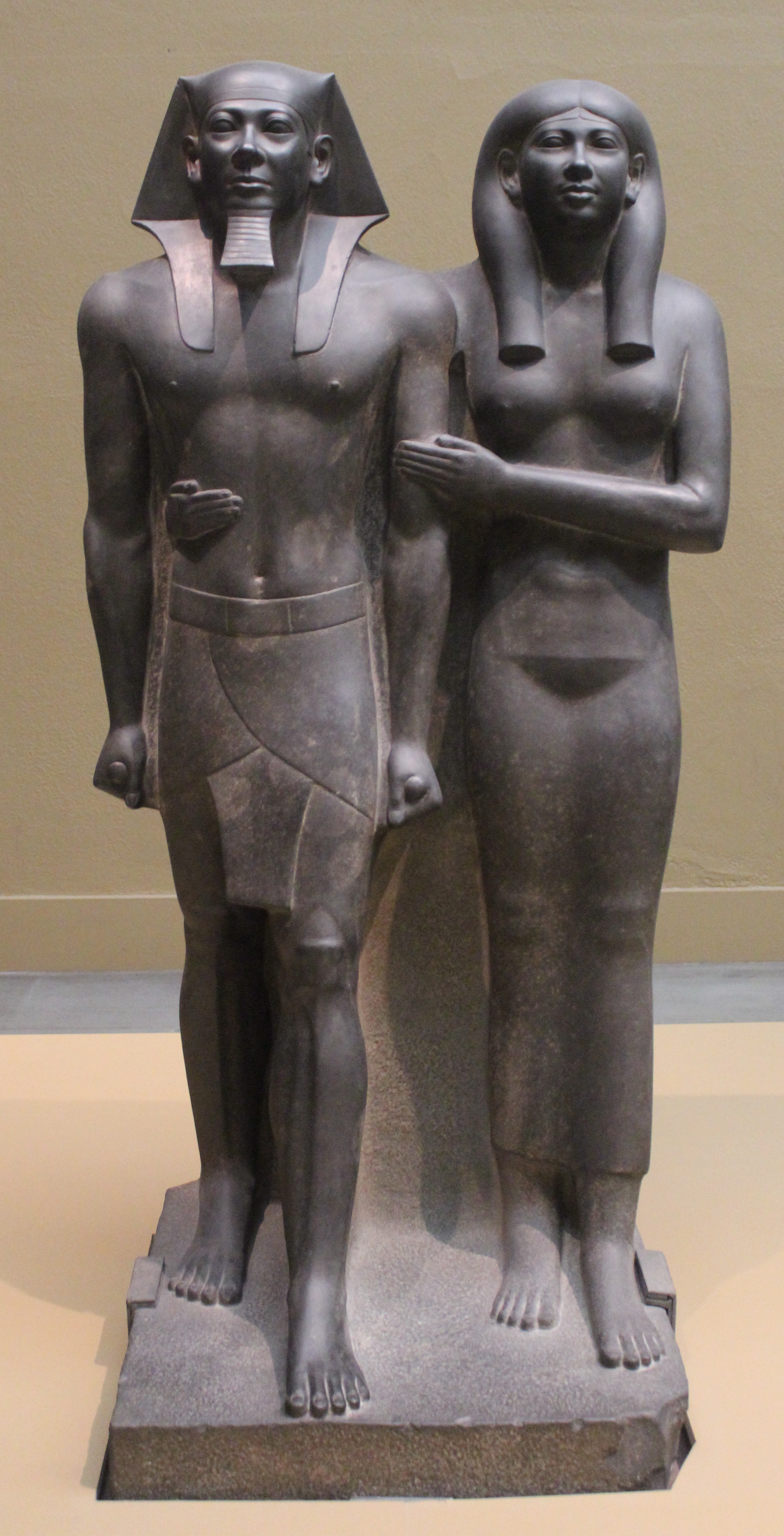
Menkaure and Khamerernebty II, his sister-wife

Menkaure succeeded his father, Khafre, as King of Egypt. Menkaure is consistently depicted in his statuary as being around the personifications of deities, and nomes.

His pyramid is the third and smallest of those at Giza pyramid complex and is known as Netjer-er-Menkaure, which translates into "Menkaure is Divine". There was a sarcophagus found within the pyramid, that is approximately eight feet in length and three feet in height, made of basalt.

=== Shepseskaf ===
Shepseskaf is generally accepted as the last king of the Fourth Dynasty, succeeding Menkaure. There is no conclusive evidence of who his mother is, though it is believed that he was the son of a minor queen. Who his wife was also is unknown. It is also uncertain of his relationship to Menkaure, and if he was a son or brother.

Shepseskaf broke the chain of pyramid building by the previous five kings. Instead of a pyramid, he chose to construct a mastaba, a rectangular block, which is commonly referred to as the Mastabat al-Fir’aun ("Pharaoh's Bench").

== Other notable individuals ==
=== Baka ===
The identification of Baka is unresolved. Several ancient lists of kings have survived. They do not agree, however, and none of them may be considered complete. The Turin King List has a lacuna between Khafre and Menkaure, where the author had listed a king who reigned between these two pharaohs. The name of the king and length of the reign are completely lost in the lacuna. The Saqqara Tablet also notes a king between Khafre and Menkaure, but here too, the name is lost. Some authorities have equated this king with Bikheris, on Manetho's list, who could correspond to the Egyptian name Baka or Bakare.

=== Khentkaus I ===
Perhaps the most intriguing evidence of the fourth dynasty is the status of Khentkaus I, also known as Khentykawes. She was a daughter of Menkaure and her tomb was built along the Menkaure causeway. She may have ruled as king.

Her tomb is a large mastaba tomb, with another off-center mastaba placed above it. The second mastaba could not be centered over her primary mastaba because of the free, unsupported, space in the rooms below.

On a granite doorway leading into her tomb, Khentkaus I is given titles that may be read either as mother of two kings of upper and lower Egypt, as mother of the king of upper and lower Egypt and king of upper and lower Egypt, or, as one scholar reads it, king of upper and lower Egypt and mother of two kings of upper and lower Egypt.

Furthermore, her depiction on this doorway also gives her the full trappings of kingship, including the false beard of the king. This depiction and the title given have led some Egyptologists to suggest that she reigned as king near the end of the fourth dynasty.

Her tomb was finished in a characteristic niche style of architecture, however, the niches were later filled in with a smooth casing of limestone.

== Changes during the Fourth Dynasty ==
=== Authority of kings ===
On the whole, Egypt was ruled by two centers of power—legal authority and traditional authority. Legal authority constituted governing by the king, not over the people directly, but via viziers and nomarchs. Traditional authority was derived from the concept that the deities gave a king the divine right to rule as he pleased. At its heart, the Fourth Dynasty Egyptian government became organized so that only the king could direct traditional authority.

=== Religious changes ===
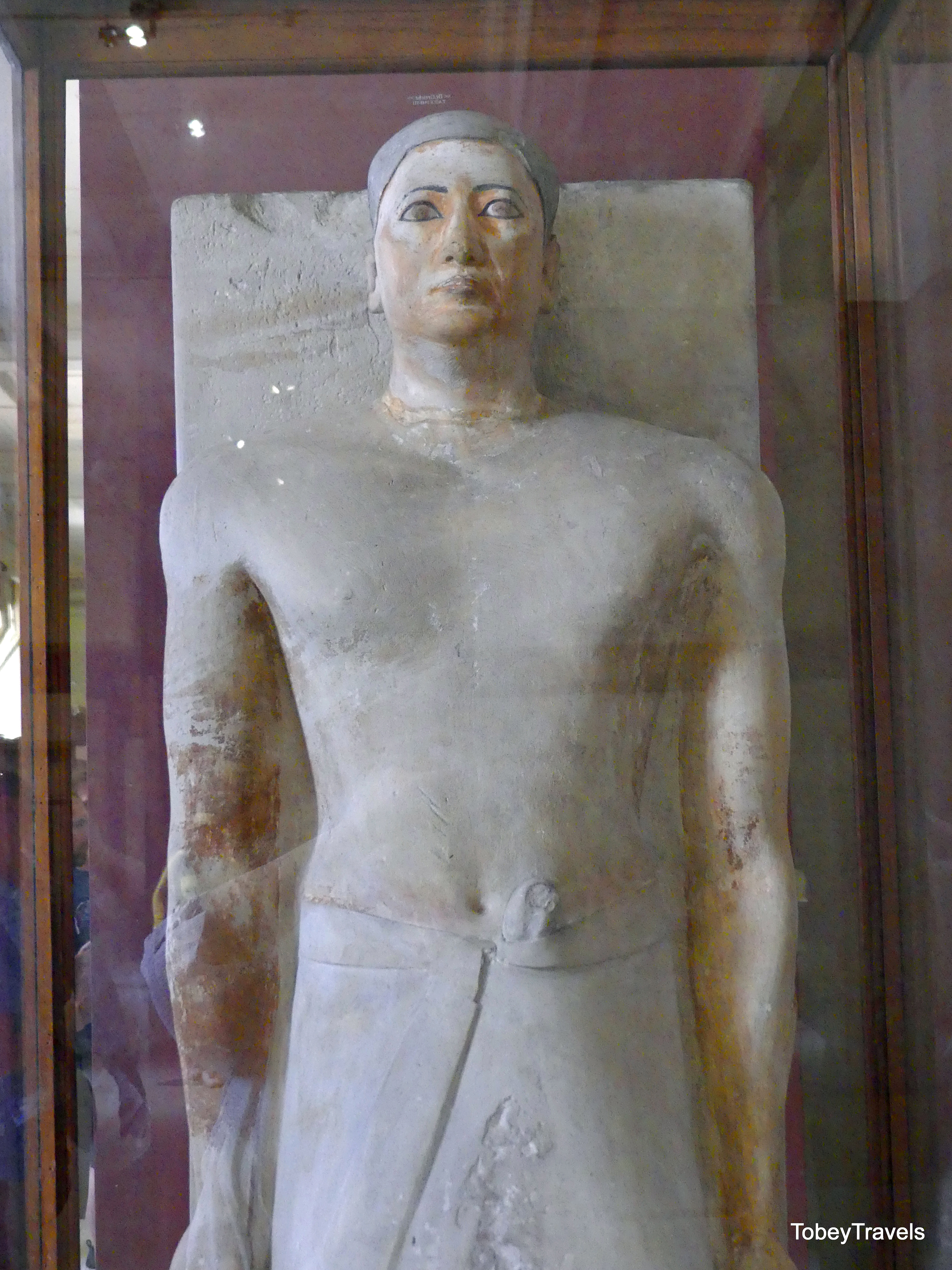
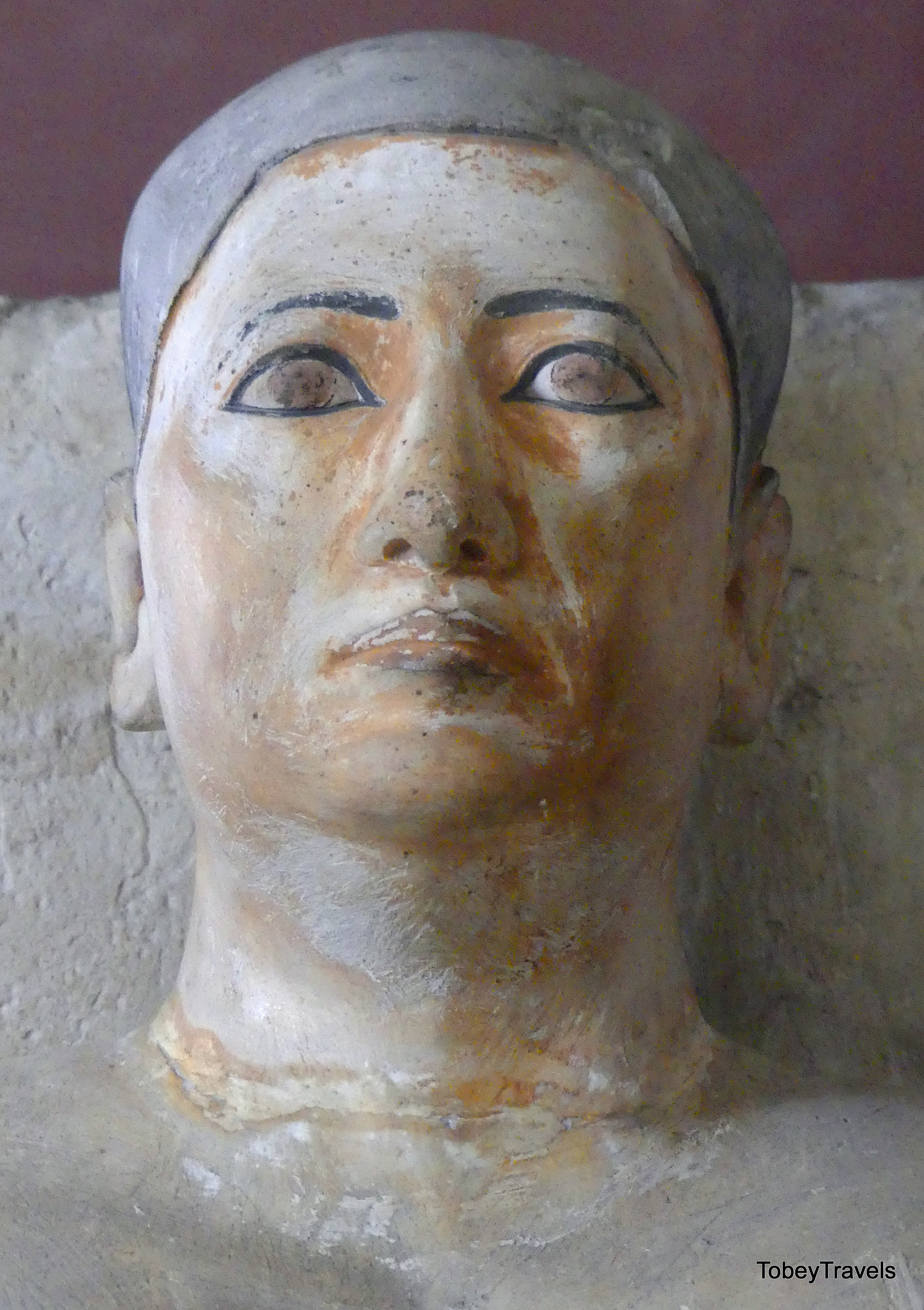
Statue of Ranofer, High Priest of Ptah. End of Fourth, beginning of Fifth Dynasty, circa 2500 BC. Egyptian Museum, Cairo

The Fourth Dynasty is a period in which a shift in religious practices can be seen. Worship of the sun was becoming the common practice, as the Cult of Ra grew in size. The worship of the Sun was centered around the tomb of the king, Djedefre in the city Heliopolis, which had been occupied since predynastic times, and named by the Ancient Greeks.

During the era centralization of the nation's resources, material, organic, and human, began to develop a relationship to the king. The kings and their relation to the deities became unchallenged, with the kings carving their named into statues and monuments that had been previously reserved for deities. Khafre's famous statue, where a falcon was incorporated into his headgear, equated the king to the god Horus.

Kings no longer associated pyramids with the afterlife. The afterlife was once believed to be a divine kingdom that was represented as a type of idealistic heaven where only kings and pure hearts could go. Instead, the Fourth Dynasty represented a change in this idea, formulated the notion that the afterlife was a familiar place, taking the semblance of Earth.

=== Changing customs drove architectural changes ===
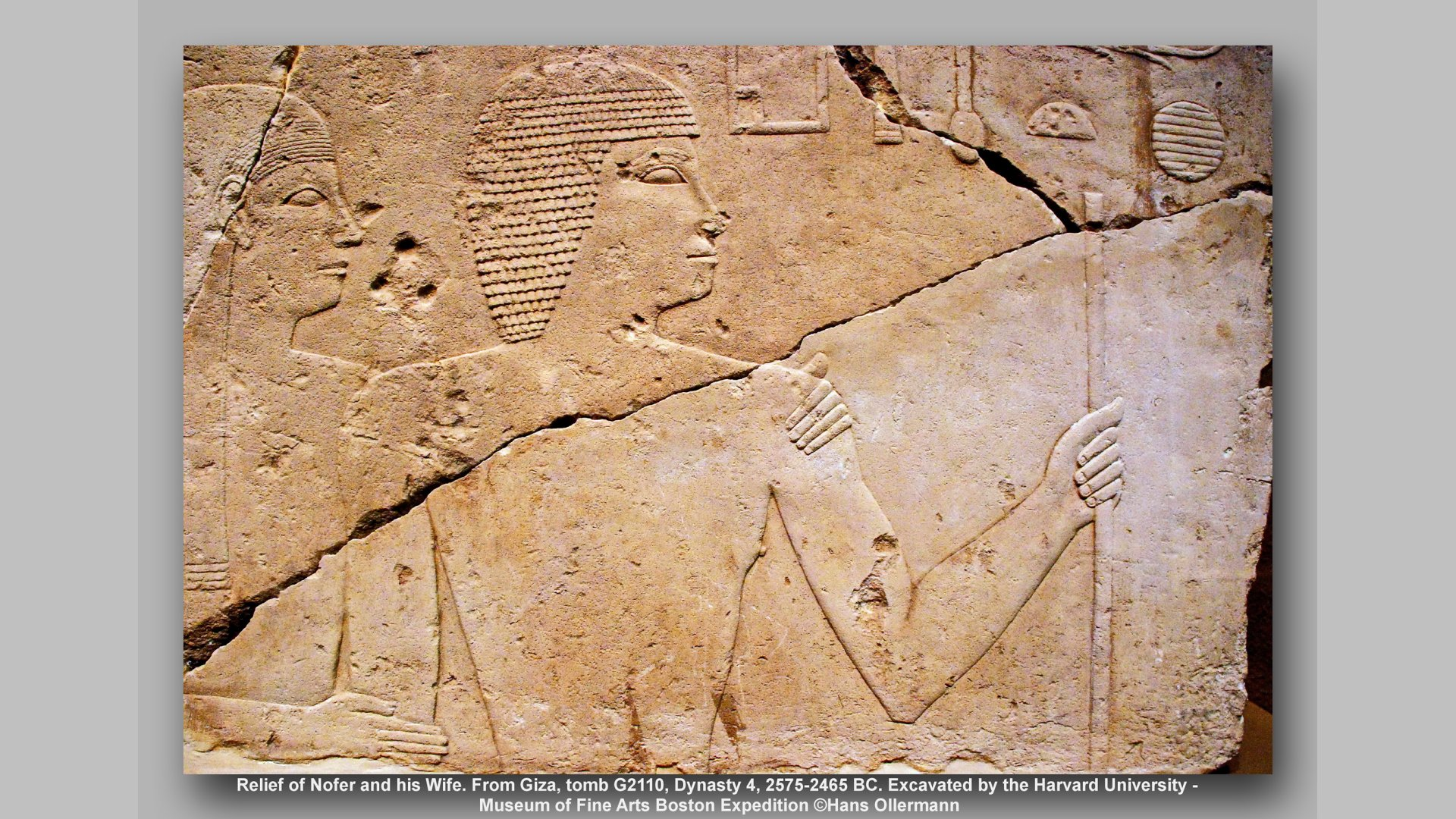
Relief of Nofer and his Wife, detail. From Giza, tomb G2110, Dynasty 4, 2575–2465 BC.

The Old Kingdom saw a rise in the preservation of the deceased, making the preparation of bodies much more complex. The position of embalmer was created, and their jobs were solely to prepare a corpse in private. There were three ways to mummify a body: 1) Stucco: the body would be wrapped in fine linen and then covered in stucco plaster, the features of the body (including the face) were remodeled in the plaster; 2) Linen: the body would be wrapped in linen, which was sometimes treated with natron (a mixture of multiple sodium carbonates) and the linens would be treated with resin so that the features of the body could be modeled; and 3) Defleshing: removing all flesh and wrapping the bones in linens. Generally, organs were removed which were then put into jars that would accompany the body in the tomb, and the inside of the body flushed out.

Tombs in the Fourth Dynasty changed drastically. "Unimpressive" graves did not satisfy the elites, meaning they would settle for smaller structures if the interior was decorated. Hieroglyphic writings were important to elites because, one, it was a lavish display of wealth and, two, it guided their souls to the afterlife. The Fourth Dynasty, however, did not have these writings. Instead, the tomb was deeper and super-structures were larger. After the Giza pyramid complex, later generations of tombs were more reasonably sized. After the Middle Kingdom, royals abandoned pyramids; they preferred graves that were carved into living rock of the Upper Egyptian mountains.

== Age of the Pyramids ==
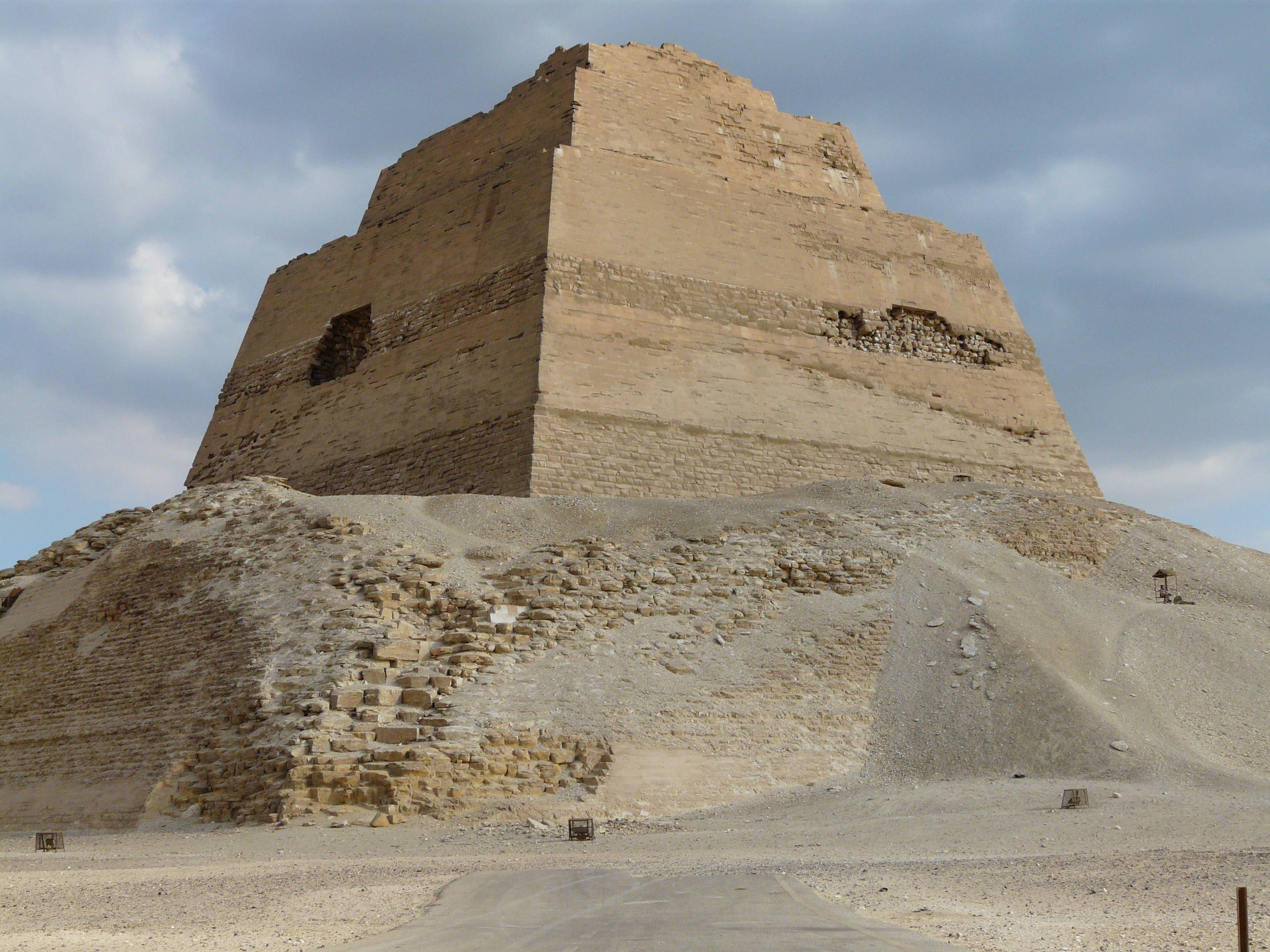
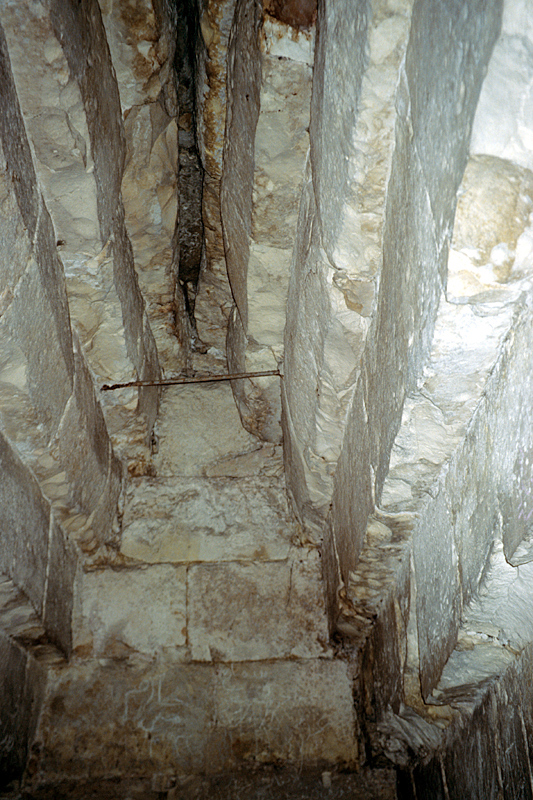
(1)Pyramide Meidum. (2)The sloped corbelled roofs inner corridor (Note: The corbelled vault in two burial chambers of the Dahshur Bent Pyramid was also used)

The dynasty of monumental pyramids builders at the Giza pyramid complex, in a historical context, is a continuation of the architectural, technological, and technically implemented buildings of the 3rd dynasty. The architect of the Djoser' pyramid, later deified as Imhotep, had to solve a number of technical and technological problems throughout the project, including securing human labor and their craft skills. The excavation of underground spaces required levelling, measuring corridors, lighting of workspaces, and significant ventilation. Their scope includes a labyrinth of tunnelled chambers and galleries, which have a total length of almost 6 km and are connected to a central shaft with a diameter of 7 m and a depth of 28 m. All this required a well-thought-out organisation of work activities, including logistical support. Proven building practices from the time of Djoser were also reflected in the construction of the pyramid of his successor, Sekhemkhet
In fact, there was a generational transfer of experience and skills, taking into account the then life expectancy, especially of physically working people.The formal transition from the 3rd to the 4th dynasty was smooth in the historical context; only economic and religious ideas and also climatic conditions changed, not the dynastic personnel succession itself. The founder of the 4th dynasty, Sneferu, during his reign of c.23 years, began and largely completed the construction of three pyramids. Apparently the first (referred to as the false one, in Egyptian as Haram al-Kaddab) at Meidum (Note: GPS 29.3883706N 31.1571283E) is said to have been the original foundation of the Huni pyramid and to have been completed during the reign of Sneferu. Its surface of limestone blocks was polished to a flat surface after completion. Sneferu then completed the construction of two more pyramids at Dahshur, the Bent Pyramid (Note: GPS 29.7902356N 31.2094681E) and the Red Pyramid. (Note: GPS 29.8085514N 31.2062444E) The last mentioned in particular is attested to by the architectural element of sloped corbelled roofs, which is exclusively presented in the large gallery of the Khufu pyramid. The peak construction period in the 4th dynasty on the Giza plateau has been archaeologically studied for a long time. The history of these works is described by Zahi Hawass

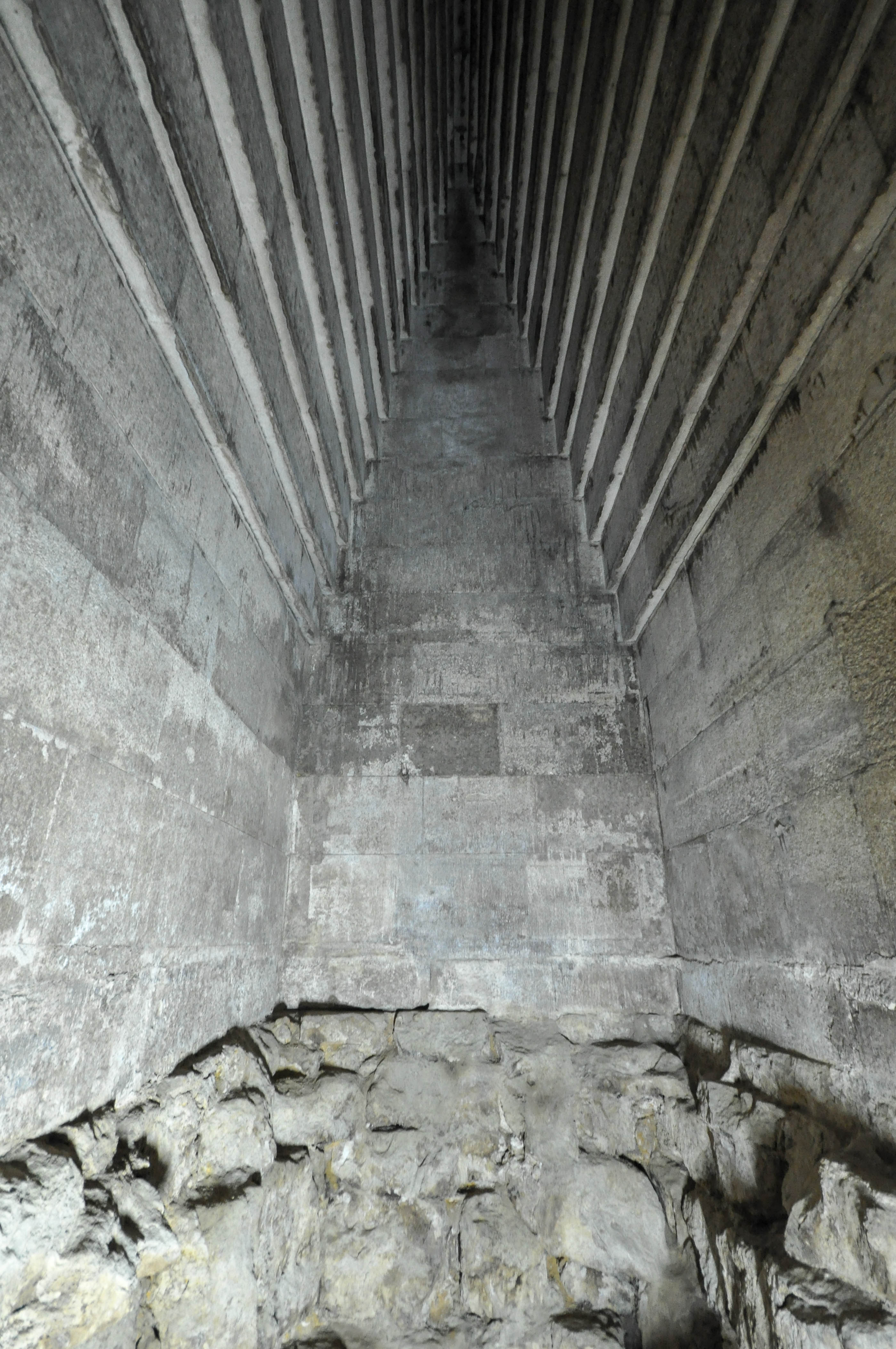
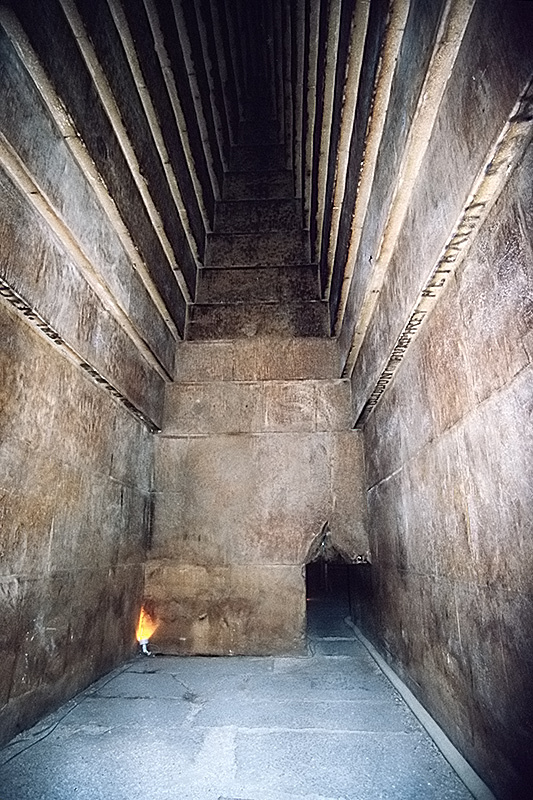
Red pyramid; Structural element of a corbel-vaulted (Note: Also used in the "Great Corridor" of the Khufu's pyramide)

The development of building practices was necessarily linked to the production of various working tools for processing stone in a wider spectrum of their quality, in a simplified list, sandstone, limestone, to the hardest Quartzite, Granite, or Diorite. Tools made of copper with additives of arsenic and other minor elements depending on their geological mining origin, metallurgical processing, and subsequent blacksmithing according to the purpose of use. The most common, among others, were canines in varying degrees of wear. Detailed physical and metallurgical properties are summarised in one of the recent works. Tools made of copper with arsenic and other minor elements showed properties mainly determined by the method of their technological processing, hot and cold forging, which did not differ much from the mining locations of the starting minerals. Copper ore was mined on a larger scale in the Eastern Desert between the Nile and the Red Sea and on the Sinai Peninsula in the Wadi al-Jarf locality, (Note: GPS:28.8916667N 32.6583333E) where numerous smelting furnaces were also found. The melted raw material was transported to Giza, where it was further processed by crafts. A unique papyrus find there, its text proved that all activities were systematically administered, including the activities of working groups, as was the case throughout the entire construction project of the pyramid complex in Giza.

The site of Heit el-Ghurab, located on the low southeastern foot of the Giza Plateau, 400 m south of the Great Sphinx, was one of a larger series of settlement areas extending north-south on the boundary with the floodplain along the eastern base of the plateau. (Note: The Heit el-Ghurab Site) These settlement concentrations probably lined the western side of the Nile canal, which ran about 200 to 300 m east of the Giza site. The site includes many of the usual features of a lively city, such as bakeries, working-class and elite housing, and administrative buildings. The city is surrounded by walls on the western, southern, and northern borders. It was a city of pyramid builders, including their families and their social facilities.
The 4th Dynasty pyramids on the plateau to the Northwest provide the reason for the emergence and development of this settlement. The half-dozen truly gigantic pyramids from the early Old Kingdom also pose a challenge to any idea of the society that built them in terms of how that society mobilised labor.

Between 1992 and 1996, an expedition from the DAI in Cairo conducted an archaeological survey on the western side of the Red Pyramid. The investigation findings confirm comparable barracks at Heit el-Ghurab, Wadi el-Jarf and Wadi el-Araba (Note: Wadi Al-Arabah, topographic depression in southern Palestine extending about c.100 miles south from the Dead Sea to the Gulf of Aqaba) which date to the first half of the 4th Dynasty, respectively, to the Old Kingdom, show that the same cell-like structure was used for various functions, dormitories, dwelling places, magazines or areas for food consumption and food production during expeditions or building projects. The structures in Dahshur are tentatively interpreted as workmen's camps, centrally provisioned, which were used during the construction of the Red Pyramid.

A geomagnetic survey conducted by the DAI in 2013 and 2014 revealed the remains of a settlement located c.140 m north of the valley temple of the Bent Pyramid. (Note: GPS 29°47'49.59"N 31°13'0.16"E) Archaeological work in the northwestern section uncovered the remains of two mud-brick structures; four rooms have been exposed so far. Given that both of the aforementioned settlements—near the Red and Bent Pyramids—date to the early 4th Dynasty, they can be understood in the context of the construction and the development of the logistics system of Sneferu’s pyramids and regarded as the Dahshur counterpart to the Heit el-Gurab site at Giza.

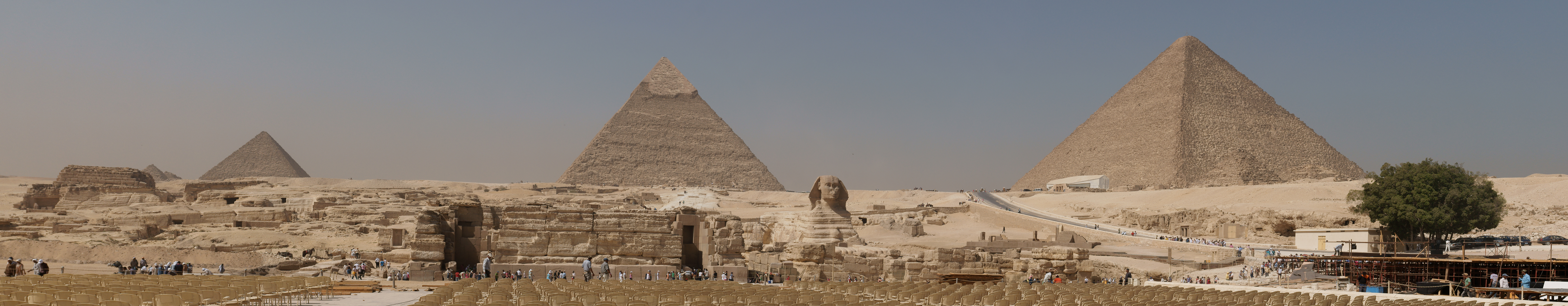
Giza pyramid complex pyramids. From left to right: the Pyramid of Menkaure, Pyramid of Khafre, the Great Sphinx of Giza and Khufu's Great Pyramid of Giza

== Comparison of regnal lists ==
The ancient king lists are in broad agreement on the order of most kings in this dynasty, though the obscure kings known Bikheris and Thamphthis were sometimes excluded. The Saqqara Tablet and Turin King List are both in fragmentary condition for this dynasty and some names and reign lengths have been lost as a result. The Saqqara Tablet has five missing cartouches between Khafre and Userkaf, the founder of the Fifth Dynasty. While up to four of these could be attributed to pharaohs recorded on other lists, it is unknown whose name would have appeared in the fifth cartouche, although Khentkaus I is a possibility.

Manetho's Aegyptiaca had a different order of kings for this dynasty: Sneferu, Khufu, Khafre, Menkaure, Djedefre, Bikheris, Shepseskaf and Thamphthis. This order places the reigns of the three pharaohs buried in the Giza pyramid complex next to each other, and all three kings are recorded reigning for over 60 years each.

Historical Pharaoh	Abydos King List	Saqqara Tablet	Turin King List	Manetho	Reign Years	
Historical Pharaoh	Abydos King List	Saqqara Tablet	Turin King List	Manetho	Turin List	Manetho
Sneferu	Sneferu	Sneferu	Snefer[u]	Soris	24	29
Khufu	Khufu	Khufu	Name lost	Souphis	23	63
Djedefre	Djedefre	Djedefre	Name lost	Rhatoises	8	25
Khafre	Khafre	Khafre	Kha[fre]	Souphis	Lost	66
Bikheris	–	Name lost	Name lost	Bikheres	Lost	22
Menkaure	Menkaure	Name lost	Name lost	Mesochris	28	63
Shepseskaf	Shepseskaf	Name lost	Name lost	Seberkheres	4	7
Thamphthis	–	Name lost	–	Thamphthis	2	9

== Third/Fourth dynasty genetics ==
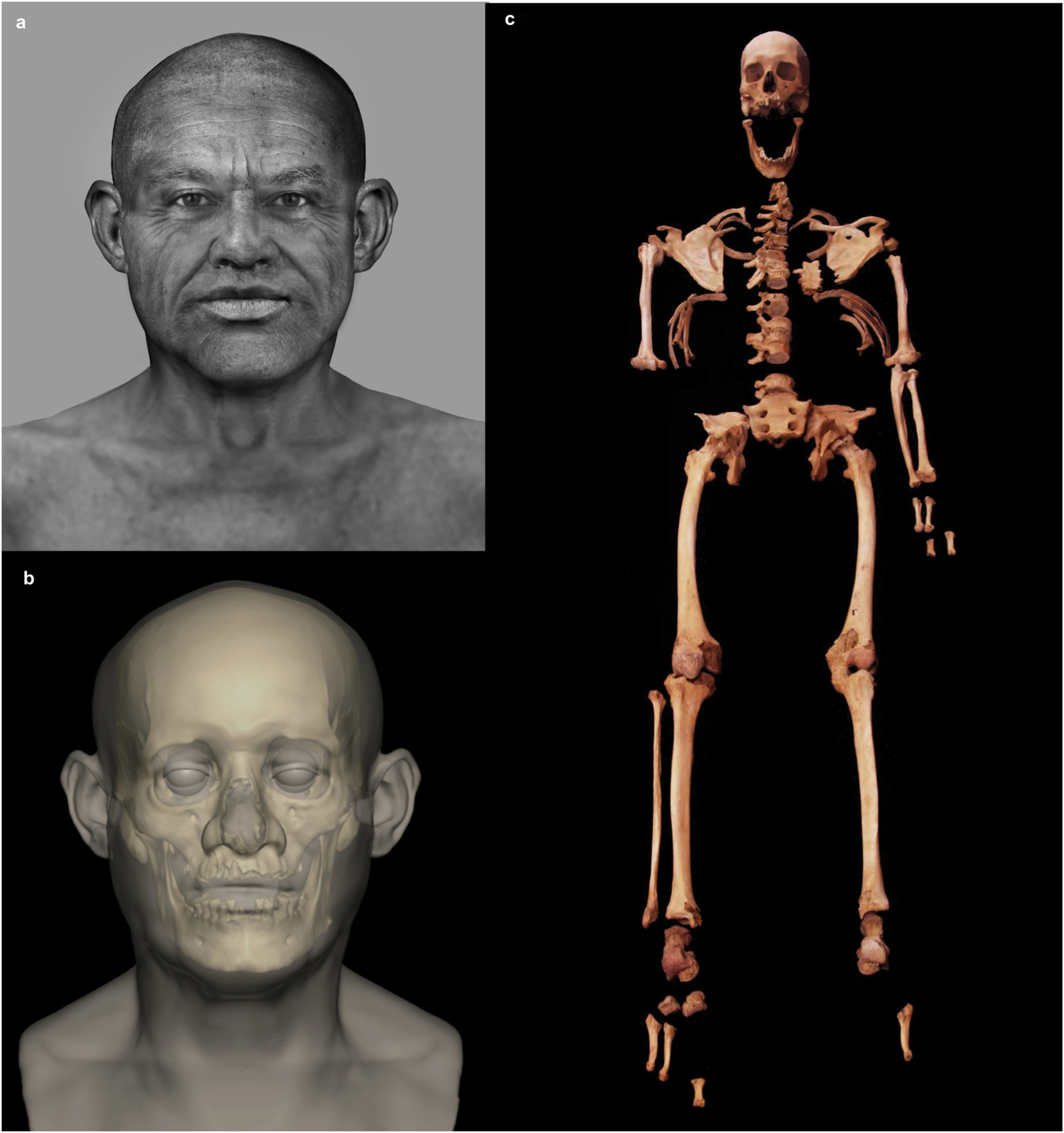
Facial reconstruction and depiction created from the Nuwayrat individual skull.

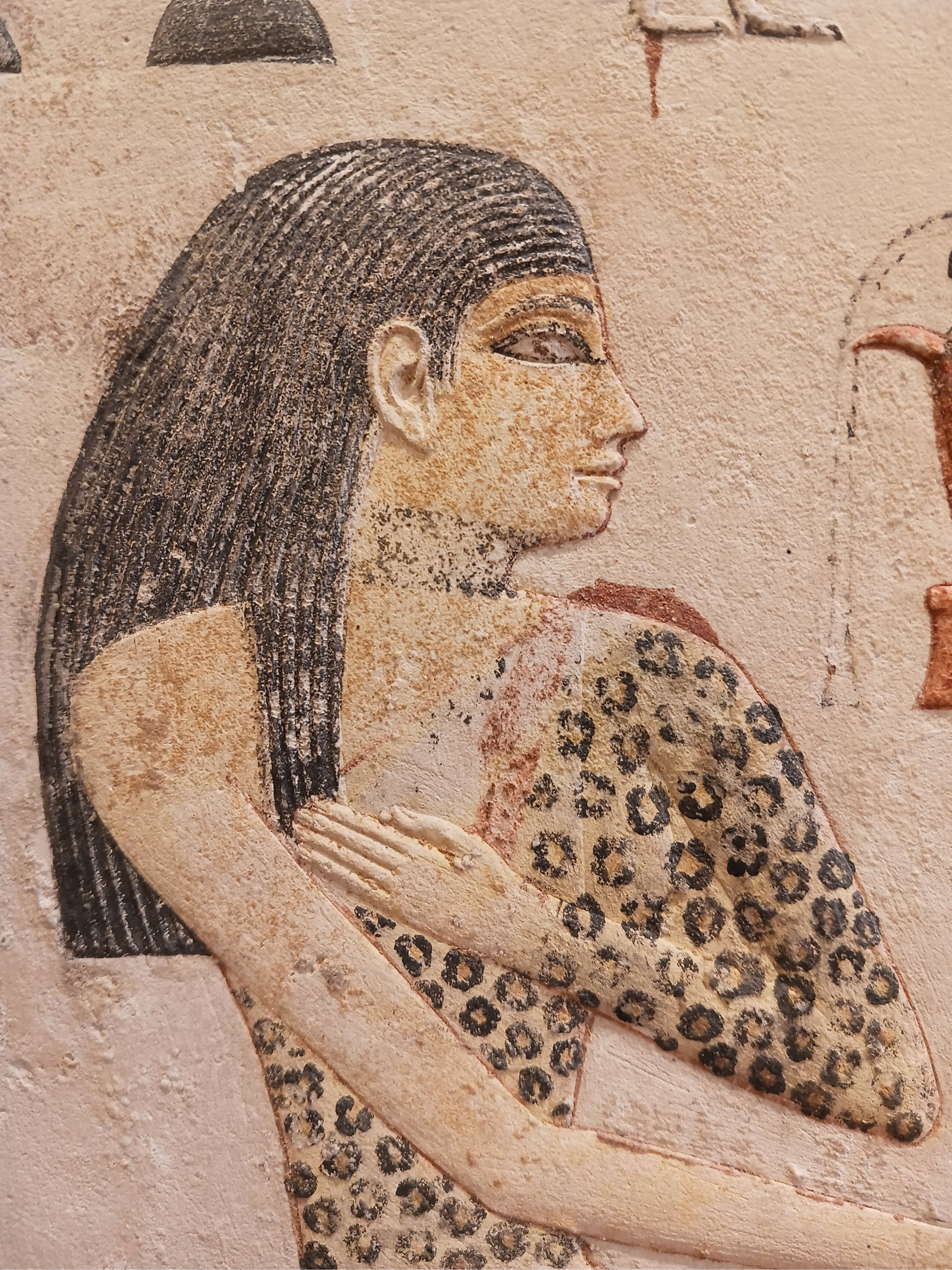
Naturalistic contemporary rendering of Princess Nefertiabet, likely daughter of Sneferu and sister of king Khufu, ca. 2580 BCE.

For the first time, in a 2025 publication by the scientific journal Nature, a whole-genome genetic study was able to give insights into the genetic background of Old Kingdom individuals, by sequencing the whole genome of an Old Kingdom adult male Egyptian of relatively high-status, radiocarbon-dated to 2855–2570 BCE, with funerary practices archeologically attributed to the Third and Fourth Dynasty, which was excavated in Nuwayrat (Nuerat, نويرات), in a cliff 265 km south of Cairo. Before this study, whole-genome sequencing of ancient Egyptians from the early periods of Egyptian Dynastic history had not yet been accomplished, mainly because of the problematic DNA preservation conditions in Egypt.

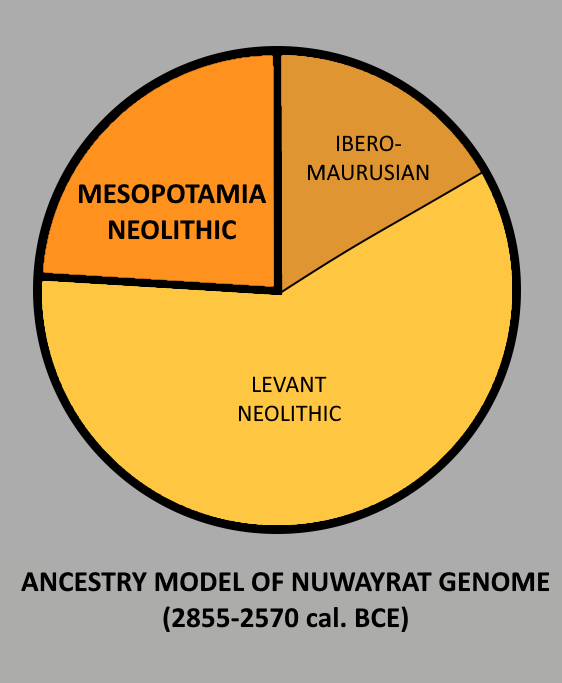
Ancestry model of Egyptian genome from Nuwayrat.

The corpse had been placed intact in a large circular clay pot without embalming, and then installed inside a cliff tomb, which accounts for the comparatively good level of conservation of the skeleton and its DNA. Most of his genome was found to be associated with North African Neolithic ancestry, but about 20% of his genetic ancestry could be sourced to the eastern Fertile Crescent, including Mesopotamia. The genetic profile was most closely represented by a two-source model, in which 77.6% ± 3.8% of the ancestry corresponded to genomes from the Middle Neolithic Moroccan site of Skhirat-Rouazi (dated to 4780–4230 BCE), which itself consists of predominantly (76.4 ± 4.0%) Levant Neolithic ancestry and (23.6 ± 4.0%) minor Iberomaurusian ancestry, while the remainder (22.4% ± 3.8%) was most closely related to known genomes from Neolithic Mesopotamia (dated to 9000-8000 BCE). Genomes from the Neolithic/Chalcolithic Levant only appeared as a minor third-place component in three-source models. A 2022 DNA study had already shown evidence of gene flow from the Mesopotamian and Zagros regions into surrounding areas, including Anatolia, during the Neolithic, but not as far as Egypt yet.

In terms of chronology, Egypt was one of the first areas to adopt the Neolithic package emerging from West Asia as early as the 6th millennium BCE. Population genetics in the Nile Valley observed a marked change around this period, as shown by odontometric and dental tissue changes. Cultural exchange and trade between the two regions then continued through the 4th millennium BCE, as shown by the transfer of Mesopotamian Late Uruk period features to the Nile Valley of the later Predynastic Period. Migrations flows from Mesopotamia accompanied such cultural exchanges, possibly through the sea routes of the Mediterranean and the Red Sea or through yet un-sampled intermediaries in the Levant, which could explain the relative smallness of genetic influence from known Chalcolithic/Bronze Age Levantines populations.

Overall, the 2025 study "provides direct evidence of genetic ancestry related to the eastern Fertile Crescent in ancient Egypt". This genetic connection suggests that there had been ancient migration flows from the eastern Fertile Crescent to Egypt, in addition to the exchanges of objects and imagery (domesticated animals and plants, writing systems...) already observed. This suggests a pattern of wide cultural and demographic expansion from the Mesopotamian region, which affected both Anatolia and Egypt during this period.

The authors acknowledged some limitations of the study such as the results deriving from one single Egyptian genome and that DNA analysis whilst indicative of population origin does not provide any evidence in relation to skin colour or facial hair.

== See also ==
- Egyptian Fourth Dynasty Family Tree

== Footnotes ==
Preceded by Third Dynasty	Dynasty of Egypt c. 2613 BC – c. 2498 BC	Succeeded by Fifth Dynasty
