= List of Egyptian pyramids =

This list presents the vital statistics of the pyramids listed in chronological order, when available.

Dates	Dynasty	Pharaoh	Modern name (ancient name)	Site	Base length (m)	Height (m)	Volume (m^{3})	Inclination °	Notes	Location	Image
	3rd 2686–2613 BC	Djoser	Pyramid of Djoser	Saqqara	121×109	60	330,400			29°52′16.56″N 31°12′59.02″E	
	3rd	Sekhemkhet	Buried Pyramid	Saqqara	120	7	33,600 (unfinished)		Unfinished pyramid converted into a square mastaba.	29.866°N 31.213°E	
	3rd	Khaba (uncertain)	Layer Pyramid	Zawyet el'Aryan	84	20	47,040 (possibly unfinished)		The connection to king Khaba is disputed, since not a single artifact with any royal name was found in the underground chambers.	29.932820°N 31.161262°E	
c. 2637–2613 BCE	4th 2613–2498 BCE	Sneferu	Pyramid of Meidum (Snefru endures)	Meidum	144	65	638,733 (possibly unfinished)	51° 50' 35"	Pyramid complex includes a satellite pyramid. The Meidum pyramid may have been originally built for Huni and continued by Sneferu.	29°23′17″N 31°09′25″E	
c. 2600 BCE	4th	Sneferu	Bent Pyramid (Snefru shines in the South)	Dahshur	188	105	1,237,040	54° 50' 35" /43° 22'	The change of the angle have been made as a stability precaution in reaction to a catastrophic collapse of the Meidum pyramid while it was still under construction.	29°47′25″N 31°12′33″E	Sneferu's Bent Pyramid in Dahshur
c. 2575–2563 BCE	4th	Sneferu	Red Pyramid (Snefru shines in the North)	Dahshur	220	105	1,694,000	43° 22'		29°48′30″N 31°12′21″E	
c. 2600-2574 BCE	4th	Khufu	The Great Pyramid of Giza (Khufu's horizon)	Giza	230.3	146.6	2,583,283	51° 50' 40"		29°58′45″N 31°08′03″E	
c. 2566–2558 BCE	4th	Djedefre	Pyramid of Djedefre (Djedefre's Starry Sky)	Abu Rawash	106.2	67	131,043 (possibly unfinished)	~52°		30°01′56″N 31°04′29″E	
c. 2530 BCE	4th (uncertain)	Bikheris? Seth-Ka?	Northern Pyramid of Zawyet el'Aryan (Star of ..?..-Ka)	Zawyet el'Aryan	200		(Never built)			29°56′24.44″N 31°9′5.6″E	
c. 2570-2532 BCE	4th	Khafre	Pyramid of Khafre (Khafre is great)	Giza	215.25	143.5	2,211,096	53°10'		29°58′34″N 31°07′51″E	
c. 2532-2504 BCE	4th	Menkaure	Pyramid of Menkaure (Menkaure is divine)	Giza	103.4	65.5	235,183	51°20′25″	Pyramid complex includes 3 queens pyramids.	29°58′21″N 31°07′42″E	
	5th 2498–2345 BC	Userkaf	Pyramid of Userkaf (The pure sites of Userkaf)	Saqqara	73.3	49	87,906	53°7'48"		29°52′25″N 31°13′08″E	
	5th	Sahure	Pyramid of Sahure (The personality (ba) of Sahure appears)	Abusir	78.75	47	96,542	50°11'40"		29°53′52″N 31°12′12″E	
	5th	Neferirkare Kakai	Pyramid of Neferirkare (Personality (ba) of Neferirkare)	Abusir	105	54	257,250	54°30'	Originally built as a stepped pyramid.	29°53′42″N 31°12′09″E	
	5th	Neferefre	Pyramid of Neferefre (The power of Neferefre is divine)	Abusir	65		29,575 (unfinished)	64°30' (intended) 78° (after mastaba conversion)	Unfinished pyramid converted into a square mastaba.	29°53′38″N 31°12′6″E	
	5th	Shepseskare	Unfinished pyramid of North Abusir (Shepseskare is in the South)	Abusir	100			–	Never built, earthwork just started	29°53′55″N 31°12′6″E	
	5th	Nyuserre Ini	Pyramid of Nyuserre (The seats of Niuserre will endure)	Abusir	79.9	51.68	112,632	51° 50' 35"	Pyramid complex includes a satellite pyramid and 1 or 2 queens pyramids.	29°53′44″N 31°12′13″E	
	5th	Menkauhor Kaiu	Headless Pyramid (The divine places of Menkauhor)	Saqqara	c. 52		n.d.	n.d.		29°52′31″N 31°13′25″E	
	5th	Djedkare Isesi	Pyramid of Djedkare-Isesi (Beautiful is Djedkare)	South Saqqara	78.75	52.5	107,835	52°	Pyramid complex includes a satellite pyramid and 1 queens pyramid.	29°51′04″N 31°13′15″E	
	5th	Unas	Pyramid of Unas (The places of Unas are beautiful)	North Saqqara	57.75	43	47,390	56°		29°52′6″N 31°12′53″E	
	6th 2345–2181 BC	Teti	Pyramid of Teti (The places of Teti are enduring)	North Saqqara	78.5	52.5	107,835	53° 7' 48"	Pyramid complex includes a satellite pyramid and 2 queens pyramids.	29°52′31″N 31°13′18″E	
	6th	Pepi I	Pyramid of Pepi I (The splendor of Pepi may endure)	South Saqqara	78.75	52.5	107,835	53° 7' 48"	Pyramid complex includes a satellite pyramid and 5 queens pyramids.	29°51′16″N 31°13′8″E	
	6th	Merenre	Pyramid of Merenre (The beauty of Merenre appears)	South Saqqara	78.75	52.5	107,835	57°7'48"		29.85055556°N 31.215°E	
	6th	Pepi II	Pyramid of Pepi II (Neferkare is established and living)	South Saqqara	78.75	52.5	107,835	53° 7' 48"		29.8403°N 31.2133°E	
	8th	Neferkare Neby	Pyramid of Neferkare Neby (The life of Neferkare is enduring)	Unknown, possibly Saqqara	n.d.		n.d.	n.d.	Archaeologically attested, but still unidentified.		
	8th	Qakare Ibi	Pyramid of Ibi	South Saqqara	31.5	21?		53° 7′	Last pyramid built in Saqqara.	29°50′30″N 31°13′4″E	
	First Intermediate Period	Khui	Pyramid of Khui	Dara	146x136		n.d.	n.d.	Unclear if it was a step pyramid or a giant mastaba.	27°18′28″N 30°52′18″E	
	10th	Merikare	Pyramid of Merikare (The abodes of Merikare are flourishing)	Unknown, possibly North Saqqara	n.d.		n.d.	n.d.	Archaeologically attested, but still unidentified.		
	11th 2060–2009 BC	Mentuhotep II	Pyramid of Mentuhotep II (The places of Nebhepetre are transfigured)	Deir el-Bahari	n.d.		n.d.	n.d.	The presence of a pyramid, stone or mudbruck, on Mentuhotep II's mortuary temple is debated. Some support this while others think that the edifice was flat-roofed, like a mastaba.	25.7374°N 32.6061°E	
	11th	Mentuhotep III	Pyramid of Mentuhotep III	Deir el-Bahari	n.d.		n.d.	n.d.	Temple and possible pyramid unfinished upon Mentuhotep's death.		
	12th 1991–1803 BC	Amenemhat I	Pyramid of Amenemhet I (Amenemhat appears at his place)	Lisht	84	55	129,360	54° 27' 44"		29.5749°N 31.2253°E	
	12th	Senusret I	Pyramid of Senusret I (Senusret beholds the two lands)	Lisht	105	61.25	225,093	49° 24'	Pyramid complex includes a satellite pyramid and 9 queens pyramids.	29°33′36.04″N 31°13′15.40″E	
	12th	Amenemhat II	White Pyramid (Amenemhat is provided)	Dahshur	50					29°48′20″N 31°13′22″E	
	12th	Senusret II	Pyramid of Senusret II (Senusret appears)	El-Lahun	106	48.6	185,665	42° 35'	Pyramid complex includes a satellite pyramid or a queens pyramid.	29°14′N 30°58′E	
	12th	Senusret III	Pyramid of Senusret III (Senusret is cool)	Dahshur	105	78	288,488	56° 18' 35"	Pyramid complex includes 7 queens pyramids.	29°49′8″N 31°13′32″E	
	12th	Amenemhat III	Pyramid of Amenemhat III (Amenemhat is beautiful)	Dahshur	105	75	274,625	56° 18' 35"		29°47′30″N 31°13′25″E	
	12th	Amenemhat III	Pyramid of Hawara (Amenemhat lives)	Hawara	105	58	200,158	48° 45'		29°16′27″N 30°53′56″E	
	12th or 13th	Amenemhat IV (?)	Southern Mazghuna pyramid	South Mazghuna	52.5	(unfinished)	n.d.	n.d.		29°45′42″N 31°13′15″E	
	12th or 13th	Sobekneferu (?)	Northern Mazghuna pyramid	North Mazghuna	>52.5	(unfinished)	n.d.	n.d.		29°46′3″N 31°13′15″E	
	13th c. 1790 BC	Ameny Qemau	Pyramid of Ameny Qemau	South Saqqara	52	35		c 55°		29°46′54″N 31°13′17″E	
	13th	Ameny Qemau (possibly usurped)	n.d.	Dahshur	n.d.		n.d.	n.d.			
	13th c. 1760 BC	Khendjer	Pyramid of Khendjer	South Saqqara	52.5	37.35	34,300	55°	Pyramid complex includes a satellite pyramid and two enclosure walls.	29°49′56″N 31°13′26″E	
	13th	unknown	Southern South Saqqara pyramid	South Saqqara	78.75	(unfinished)	n.d.	n.d.		29°49′50″N 31°13′20″E	
	13th c. 1740 BC	Likely Neferhotep I	Tomb S9	Abydos	uncertain		unknown		Likely a pyramid, similar to Khendjer's, but possibly a mastaba	26°10′17″N 31°55′30″E	
	13th c. 1730 BC	Likely Sobekhotep IV	Tomb S10	Abydos	uncertain		unknown		Likely a pyramid, similar to Khendjer's, but possibly a mastaba	26°10′16″N 31°55′27″E	
	13th	Merneferre Ay	Pyramid of Merneferre Ay	Unknown, possibly Memphis	n.d.		n.d.	n.d.	Archaeologically attested, but still unidentified.		
	17th c. 1570 BC	Sobekemsaf II	Pyramid of Sobekemsaf II	Unknown, possibly Dra' Abu el-Naga'	n.d.		n.d.	n.d.	Archaeologically attested, but still unidentified. The Abbott and Leopold-Amherst Papyruses state that the tomb was robbed and burned during the reign of Ramesses IX.		
	17th	Sekhemre-Wepmaat Intef	Pyramid of Sekhemre-Wepmaat Intef	Dra' Abu el-Naga'	n.d.		n.d.	n.d.	Archaeologically attested, but still unidentified.		
	17th	Nubkheperre Intef	Pyramid of Nubkheperre Intef	Dra' Abu el-Naga'	11	13	n.d.	60°		25°44′13″N 32°37′26″E	
	18th (1550–1292 BC)	Ahmose I	Pyramid of Ahmose	Abydos	52.5	10	n.d.	60°	Built as a cenotaph. It is the only royal pyramid in Abydos.	26°10′30″N 31°56′16″E	

== See also ==
- Egyptian pyramids
- Great Sphinx of Giza
- Lepsius list of pyramids
- List of Egyptian pyramidia
- List of finds in Egyptian pyramids
- List of pharaonic tombs
- List of the oldest buildings in the world
- Umm El Qa'ab

== Bibliography ==
- Lehner, Mark (2008). The Complete Pyramids. New York: Thames & Hudson. ISBN 978-0-500-28547-3.
- Verner, Miroslav (2001). The Pyramids: The Mystery, Culture and Science of Egypt's Great Monuments. New York: Grove Press. ISBN 978-0-8021-1703-8.
