= Unfinished Northern Pyramid of Zawyet El Aryan =

Unfinished pyramid at Zawyet El Aryan, Egypt

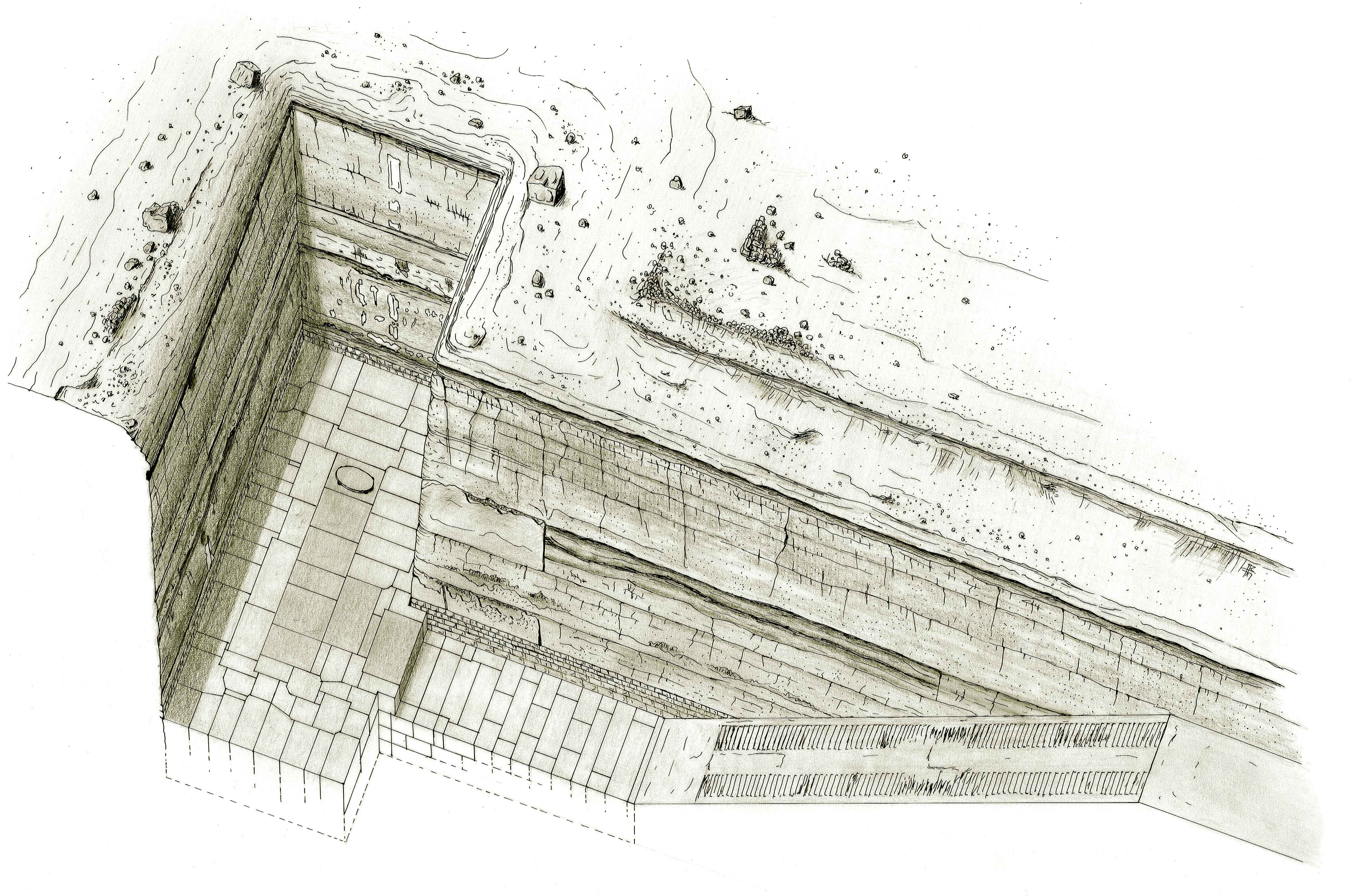
- Interactive map of Unfinished Northern Pyramid of Zawyet El Aryan
- 29°56′24.44″N 31°9′5.6″E
- Owner: Owner uncertain, possibly Bikheris
Ancient name
V10A HASH D28 V11A S29 D58 N14
Seba ?-Ka
Star of ?-Ka
- Constructed: c. 2530 BC
- Type: True pyramid
- Material: natural bedrock, grey granite and pink granite
- Height: N.A.
- Base: 200 m (660 ft)
- Slope: uncertain, possibly 52 deg.

The Unfinished Northern Pyramid of Zawyet El Aryan, also known as Pyramid of Baka, Pyramid of Bakare and Pyramid of Bikheris is the term archaeologists and Egyptologists use to describe a large shaft part of an unfinished pyramid at Zawyet El Aryan in Egypt. Archaeologists are generally of the opinion that it belongs to the early or the mid-4th Dynasty (2613–2494 BC) during the Old Kingdom period. The pyramid owner is not known for certain and most Egyptologists, such as Miroslav Verner, think it should be a king known under his hellenized name, Bikheris, perhaps from the Egyptian Baka(re). In contrast, Wolfgang Helck and other Egyptologists doubt this attribution.

== Research history ==
The first descriptions of the monument were made between 1842 and 1846 by the German egyptologist Karl Richard Lepsius. He investigated the main shaft and its surroundings and marked the pyramid in his pioneering list as "Pyramid XIII".

The pyramid shaft was examined more closely in 1904–1905 by the Italian archaeologist Alessandro Barsanti. Gaston Maspero, then director-general of the Supreme Council of Antiquities of Egypt, visited Barsanti's excavations and was struck by the monumental size of the construction. He writes:

... I hope that the best informed amongst the tourists will come to admire the monument: the pleasure they will experience during this trip is worth the two or three hours it will take. At first, the immensity of the task undertaken by the Egyptians will not appear to them, it is only at the bottom of the stairway, when they will walk upon the granite pavement that it will become obvious. It is not that anything in particular when examined in details is remarkable or out of the ordinary, but the general feeling is one of those one never forgets. The size and richness of the materials, the perfection of the cuts and joints, the peerless finish of the granite tank, the boldness of structure and the sheer height of the walls, everything comes together to compose this so far unique ensemble. It is an awe inspiring shock and nowhere is the power and mastery of the old Egyptian architects so suddenly and strongly obvious as here.

Barsanti undertook further work on the site in 1911–1912 but the First World War brought all excavations to a halt and Barsanti died in 1917. As a consequence, nothing happened on the site until 1954 when a set was needed for the epic film Land of the Pharaohs. The landscape of Zawyet El Aryan seemed to be the perfect place and the pyramid of Baka was chosen as a backdrop for the movie. Consequently, the shaft and its surroundings were cleared from sand and rubble which had covered the area since Barsanti's excavations.

Since 1964, the pyramid of Zawyet El Aryan lies within a military restricted area. Consequently, no excavations are allowed, the necropolis surrounding the pyramid is overbuilt with military bungalows and the shaft is misused as a local dump. Thus, the status of the shaft is now uncertain and most likely disastrous.

== Description ==
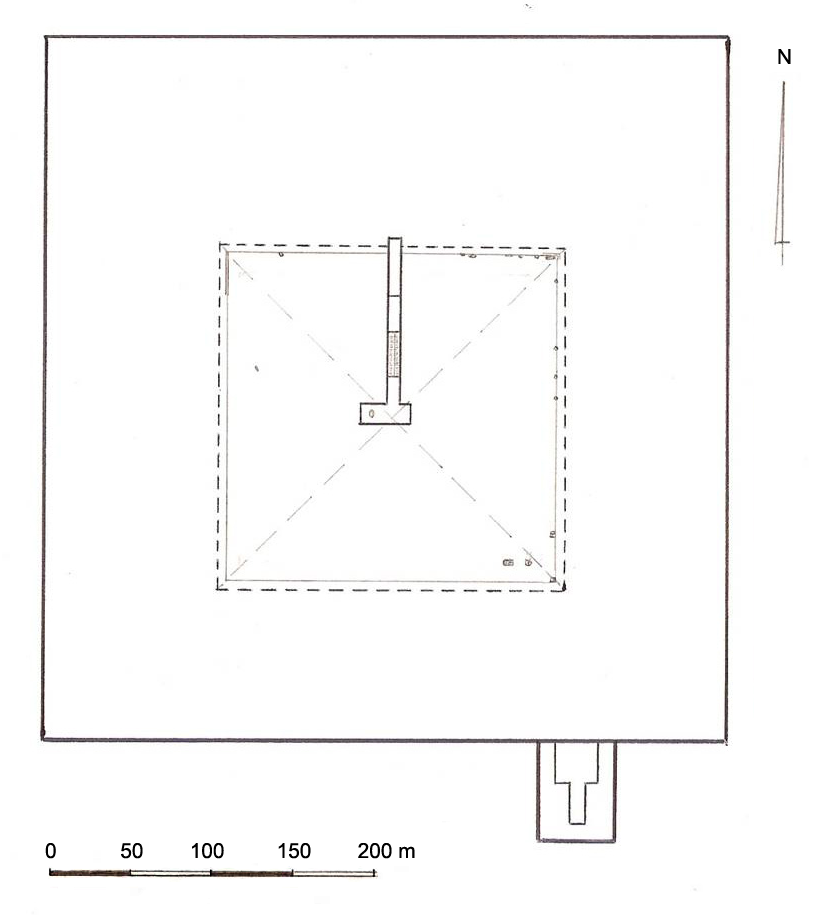
Floor plan of the pyramid.

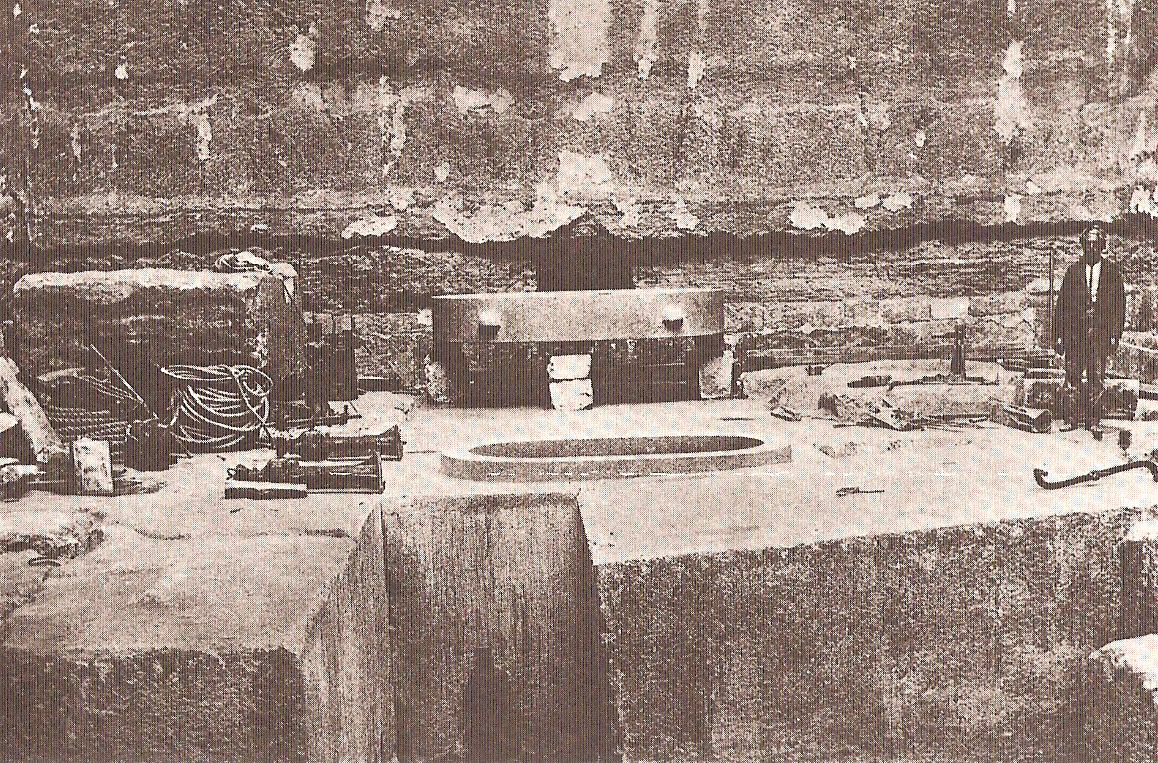
Underground chamber with the oval vat (1905 photography).

=== Location ===
The pyramid of Baka is located in the Northern sector of Zawyet El Aryan, around 8 km (5.0 mi) south-west of Giza, in the North-Eastern corner of the military restricted area.

=== Superstructure ===
Next to nothing is known about the superstructure of the pyramid as indeed only the square base, made of natural bedrock, was finished. It measures 200 m × 200 m (660 ft × 660 ft) and shows traces of a surrounding pedestal, preserved for the limestone covering. The exact planned size and slope cannot be evaluated because no covering blocks nor any pyramidion were ever found and pyramid pedestals were always larger than the base of the pyramid itself. Thus, it cannot be excluded that the planned size of the pyramid could have been noticeably smaller.

=== Substructure ===
The substructure consists of a T-shaped shaft, the corridor of which is on a South to North axis and the chamber on an East to West axis. The complete shaft has no remaining ceiling and it is possible that it never had any. A steep stairway leads down to the chamber. At half its length, the stairway is interrupted by a horizontal surface of unknown purpose. The shaft walls are smooth but were never covered with stones and the chamber was never completed. Only the floor of the chamber was finished and covered with massive granite blocks, each being 4.5 m (15 ft) long and 2.5 m (8.2 ft) thick and weighing up to 9 tons each. Close to the Western end of the chamber, an unusual vat was discovered. It has an oval shape and was embedded into one of the stone blocks constituting the chamber floor. It seems that the vat was brought into the chamber some time during the construction of the foundations since it is too big to fit through the passageway leading to the chamber. The vat is 3.15 m (10.3 ft) long, 2.22 m (7.3 ft) broad and 1.5 m (4.9 ft) deep. The oval lid was found in situ, indicating that the vat was found sealed. According to Barsanti, small traces of a substance were found inside the vat, but unfortunately they were never examined closer and today they are lost. Furthermore, Barsanti claims to have found a damaged dedication tablet with the name of king Djedefre on it.

=== Pyramid complex ===
The alignment of the pyramid complex is very similar to that of the pyramid of Djedefre. It consisted of a 465 m × 420 m (1,526 ft × 1,378 ft) enclosure wall within which the mortuary temple should have been located. However, since the first layer of the pyramid was never even started, the surrounding complex was also left unfinished and there are no traces of a mortuary temple, a causeway, a valley temple or any other cultic building.

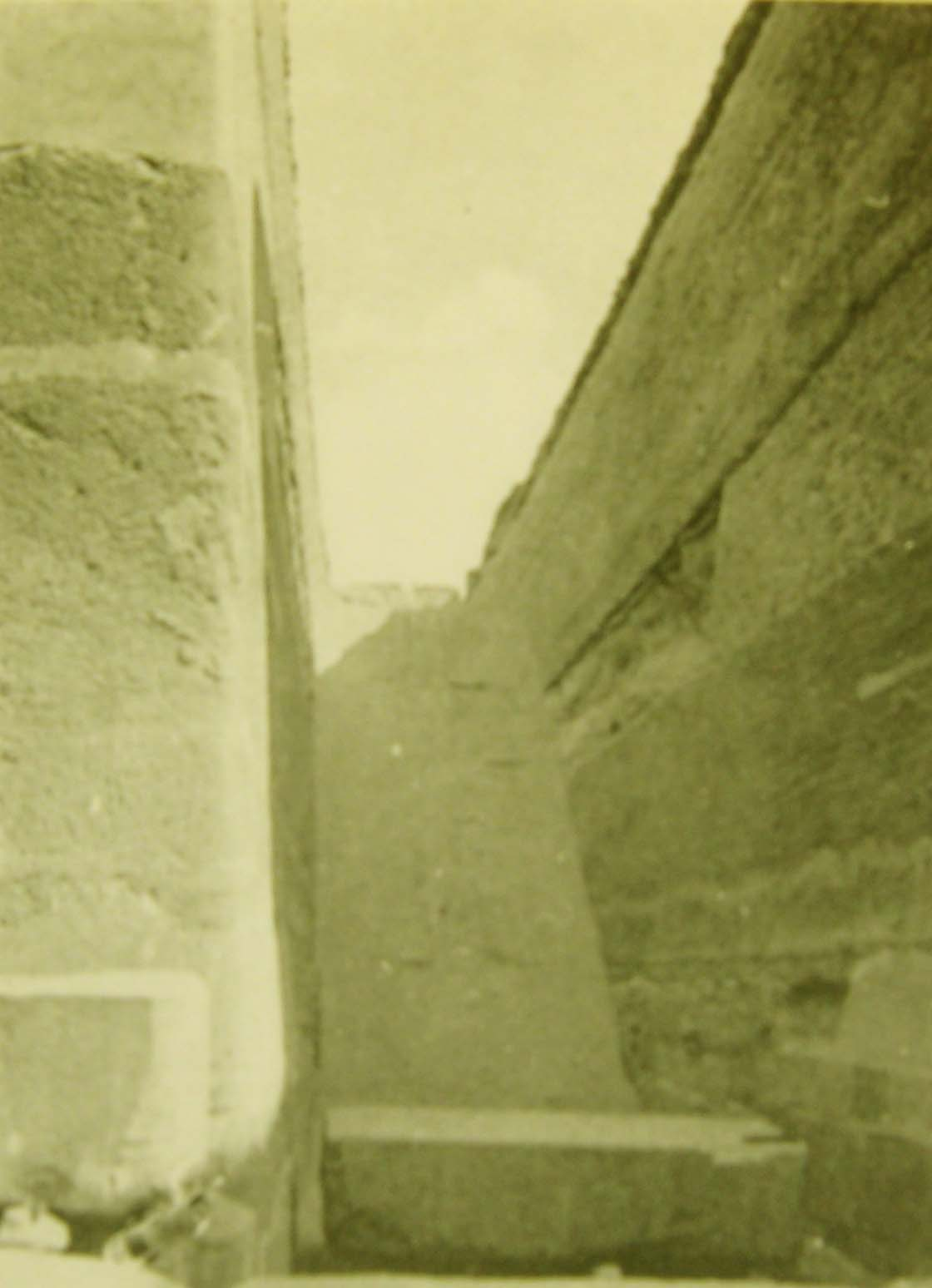
Descending stairway, 1912 photography

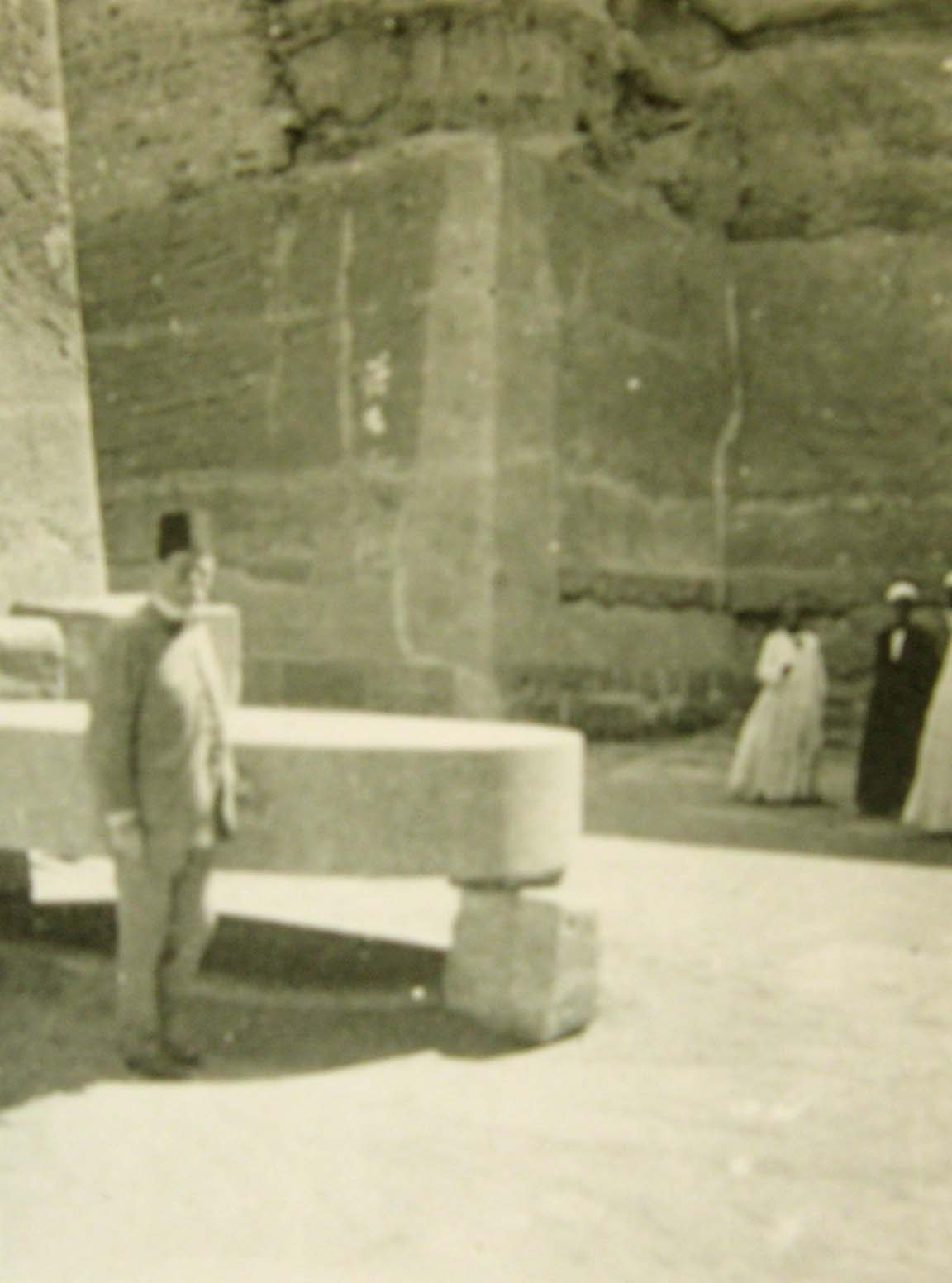
Burial chamber, 1912 photography

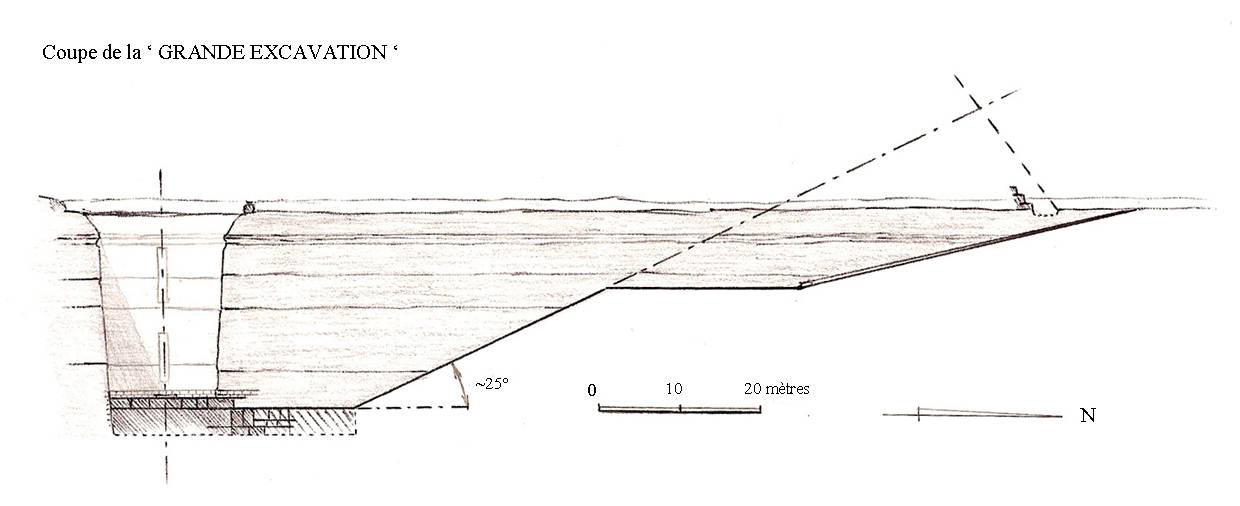
Transverse view of the stairway and burial chamber

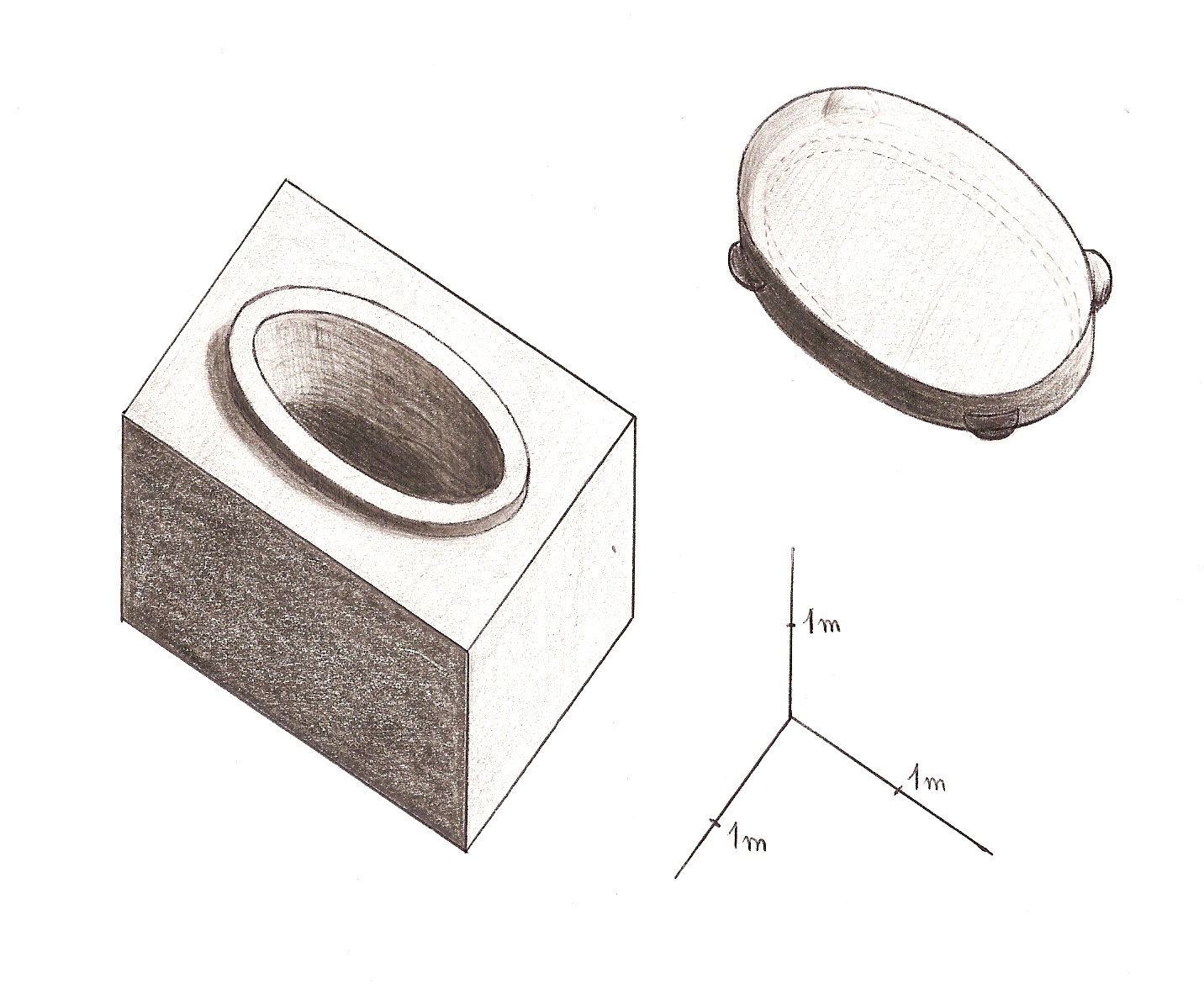
Drawing of the oval vessel

== Dating ==
=== Dynasty ===
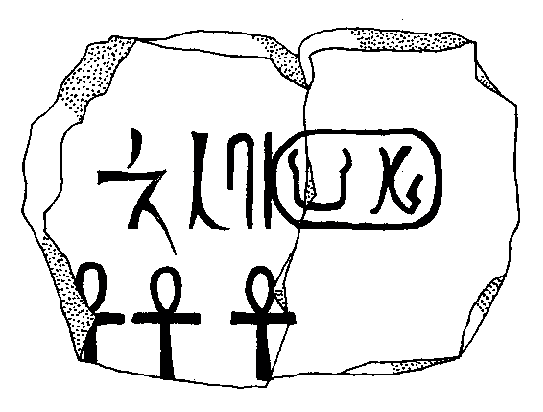
Limestone fragment with inscription No.21 including the ominous cartouche name.

Egyptologists and historians continue to debate the dating of the pyramid of Baka. They point to several graffiti made of black and red ink, which were found in the chamber and in the descending stairway. Alessandro Barsanti recorded at least 67 inscriptions. They record the names of different workmen crews as well as the name of the planned pyramid complex: Seba ?-Ka, meaning "The Star of ?-Ka". The workmen crew whose name appears most often — thus being the leading crew during the building works — was Wer-ef-seba ?-Ka, meaning "Great Like the Star of (King) ?-Ka". Inscription No.35 gives the name Neferka-Nefer (meaning "His Beautiful Ka is Flawless"), but otherwise lacks any reference to known people from the 4th Dynasty. Graffiti No.15 and No.52 also mention an interesting royal name: Nebkarâ, meaning "Lord of the Ka of Râ". It is unknown if this is actually the name of a yet unknown king or that of a prince. A further inscription, No.55, mentions a possible Gold name: Neb hedjet-nwb, meaning "Lord of the Golden Crown". Some egyptologists propose that this is either the Horus name of king Huni or the Gold name of king Nebka. This, however, would implicate that the pyramid was built during the late 3rd Dynasty rather than the 4th.

=== Name of the king ===
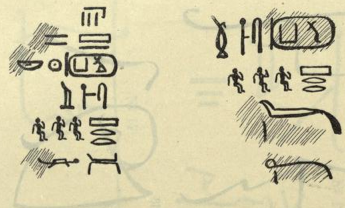
Red-ink inscription with the name of the crews of workmen, 1905 drawing by A. Barsanti.

The main problem is the correct reading of the cartouche name found within at least six ink inscriptions. Whilst the lower and therefore second hieroglyphic sign is certainly a Ka-symbol, the first sign is illegible. Unfortunately the excavator, Alessandro Barsanti made no facsimiles of the inscriptions and made rather slipshod hand-drawings instead, so that the first hieroglyph remains indecipherable. As a consequence there are several alternative readings of the cartouche name: Kurt Sethe reads Nebka ("His Ka is the lord"), Jean-Philippe Lauer reads Bik-Ka ("his Ka is divine"), Peter Kaplony reads Schena-Ka ("his Ka is forceful") and Gaston Maspero reads Nefer-Ka ("his Ka is beautiful/flawless"). Wolfhart Westendorf even proposes the depiction of a giraffe, an animal that was seen as wise and bedizen with shamanistic powers.

Jürgen von Beckerath and George Reisner instead think that the pyramid was planned as the tomb for a well attested prince of the 4th Dynasty named Baka, a son of king Djedefre. Baka's name is written with the hieroglyphs of a ram together with the Ka-symbol. Beckerath assumes that Baka changed his name into Bakarê ("Soul and Ka of Râ") when he ascended the throne but then died unexpectedly, leaving nothing more than an unfinished tomb shaft. Thus, Beckerath and Reisner read the mysterious name at Zawyet El Aryan as Ba-Ka ("His Ka is his Ba"). Aidan Dodson instead sees a sitting Seth-animal and therefore reads the name found in the pyramid as Seth-Ka ("Seth is my Ka"). He believes that the pyramid was planned as the tomb of prince Setka, another son of king Djedefre. Dodson doubts the reading "Baka" and wonders why the cartouche name at Zawyet El Aryan contains no sun-hieroglyph when it was meant to be addressed to the sun god. Either way, both theories, if correct, would place the pyramid of Baka firmly in the 4th Dynasty. Supporting this datation, von Beckerath, Reisner and Dodson point to the architectural features of the burial shaft, in particular the use of hewn granite blocks for bases in such sizes occurs no earlier than the reign of Khufu. Additionally, according to Barsanti, fragments of a similar oval sarcophagus were found in the ruins of the pyramid of Djedefre. Furthermore, von Beckerath, Reisner and Dodson point to the dedication tablet of Djedefre allegedly found by Barsanti near the stairway of the pyramid of Baka as a proof of its 4th Dynasty date.

Kurt Sethe, Nabil Swelim and Wolfgang Helck contradict the former arguments and date the shaft to the late 3rd Dynasty. They point out that, in general, the use of hewn granite as a floor covering in royal tombs was a tradition since the reign of king Khasekhemwy, the last pharaoh of 2nd Dynasty. Furthermore, the tradition of building shaft-like tombs beneath a pyramid was a tradition of the 3rd Dynasty, not of the 4th Dynasty. The alignment of the pyramid complex on a South to North axis was also a common during the 3rd Dynasty. Additionally, W. Helck and Eberhard Otto point out, that the design similarities between the pyramid of Baka and that of Djedefre might be striking, but the design of Djedefre's pyramid was atypical for the 4th Dynasty anyway. Thus, to use Djedefre's tomb design as a comparison argument cannot confirm a 4th Dynasty datation. Finally, egyptologists doubt the evaluations of Barsanti concerning the size of the pyramid base. They think that the pyramid was not so big as Lepsius and Barsanti evaluated. They also doubt the finding of Djedefre's dedication tablet, because this artifact was never published.

== See also ==
- List of Egyptian pyramids
