= Setka (prince) =

- Prince of Egypt
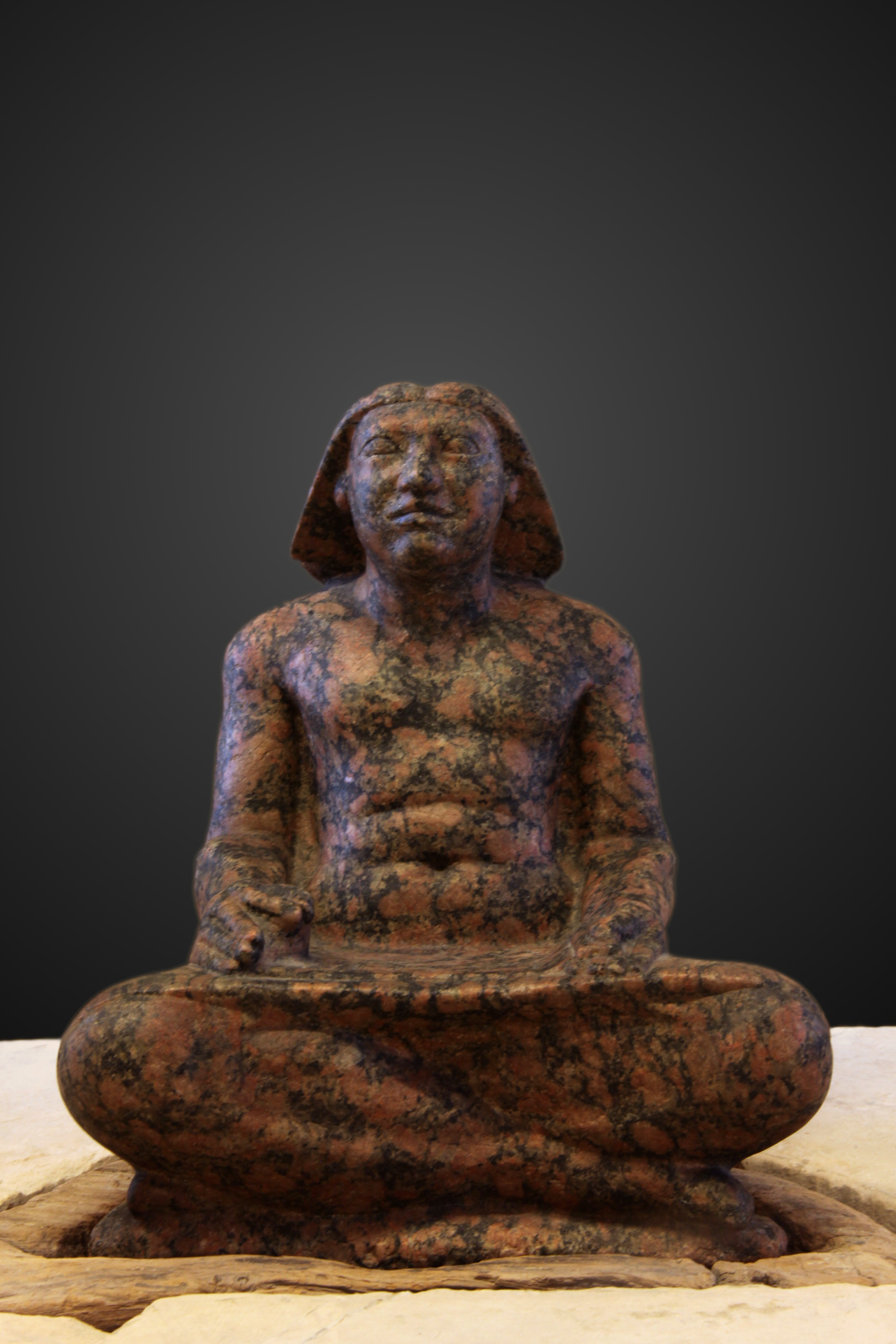
- Statuette of Setka at the Louvre Museum
- Years active: c. 2550 BC
Egyptian name
s st t kASt k3
- Father: Djedefre

Setka (fl. c. 2550 BC) is the name of an ancient Egyptian crown prince. He is known for his statuette in the shape of a seated scribe. He is also the subject of a theory that claims he was king of Egypt for a very short time.

== Identity ==
Setka was the eldest son and crown prince of king Djedefre. He lived and worked during the 4th Dynasty. His family life is unknown, the names of his wives and children are lost. Since the names of three other sons of Djedefre, namely Baka, Harnit, and Nykau-Djedefre are archaeologically detected, these should be Setka's brothers or half-brothers. The daughters of Djedefre, Hetepheres III and Neferhetepes, would be Setka's sisters or half-sisters. His mother is unknown, too. It could be one of Djedefre's wives, Khentetka or Hetepheres II, but this is highly uncertain.

== Office and career ==
According to the inscription on the podest of his statuette, Setka was Member of the elite, Eldest bodily son of the king, High lector priest of his father, Provost of the morning house and Head of the palace.

== Possible reign as king ==
According to Egyptologist Aidan Dodson, it is possible that Setka was king in Egypt for a very short time (maybe one or two years). His assumption is based on the so-called Unfinished Northern Pyramid of Zawyet el'Aryan, which is located at Zawyet el'Aryan. This unfinished pyramid shaft was abandoned shortly after beginning and only a great sum of red and black ink inscriptions left by the workmen were found. These provide a royal cartouche name, which remains partially illegible. The first sign can be identified as a Ka-sign, but the first, introducing sign was copied by the pyramid excavator so fuzzy, that it remains undecipherable. Aidan Dodson is convinced of the depiction of a sitting Seth-animal, reading the royal name as Seth-Ka ("Seth is my Ka"). In this case, Setka had actually followed his father onto the throne. Additionally, some scholars believe that Setka and his father Djedefre started some kind of family feud when he ascended the throne. This would explain why any contemporary document mentioning him was destroyed, except for his statuette, which was already placed in Djedefre's pyramid as a grave good. It could also explain why Djedefre and Setka chose their own burial sites at a remarkable distance from the Giza necropolis.

Dodson's theory is not commonly accepted, though. Egyptologists such as Rainer Stadelmann and George Reisner propose prince Baka as the owner of the unfinished pyramid. According to their theory, Baka (whose name was written with the signs of a ram and the Ka) simply used the original name form due his lifetime, but it was changed after his death into Bakarê ("soul and Ka of Râ"). In ancient Greek chronics Baka's name was hellenized into Bikheris. For this reason, the unfinished tomb shaft at Zawyet el'Aryan is also called "Pyramid of Bikheris".

== Setka's statuette ==
Setka is known to scholars only by his statuette. It was found during the winter of 1901 by French archaeologist Émile Chassinat in Abu Rawash, when he excavated the Pyramid of Djedefre. Today the statuette is on display at the Louvre museum in Paris under its inventory number E 12639. Setka's statuette is the eldest known model of the so-called seated scribe typus. The artifact is made of polished granite and 30 cm high, 23 cm wide and 17 cm deep. The figure is shown in a cross-legged position, holding a papyrus sheet in its lap and an imaginary writing bulrush. The pedestal of the statue is made of polished limestone, its surface is engraved with Setka's name and titles. The papyrus sheet is decorated with the title Bodily son of the king.
