= Bikheris =

Egyptian pharaoh

- Baka and Bakare
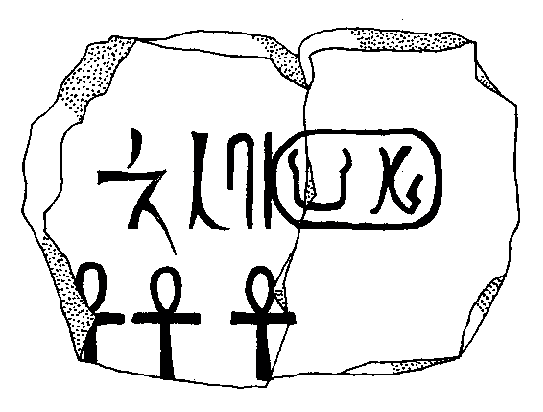
- Inscribed limestone fragment possibly showing Bikheris' name

Pharaoh
- Reign: c. 2570 BC
- Predecessor: Khafre (?)
- Successor: Menkaure (?)
Royal titulary
- Probably the same person as Baka.
Nomen
If he is to be identified with prince Baka, then:
Baka
b3-k3
His soul is (in) his Ka
< E10 D28 Z1 >
hieroglyphs (reconstitution):
Bakarê
b3-k3-rˁ
His soul is the Ka of Ra
< N5 E10 D28 >or< N5 G29 D28 >
- Father: Djedefre ?
- Dynasty: 4th Dynasty

Bikheris (fl. c. 2570 BC) is the Hellenized name of an ancient Egyptian king, who may have ruled during the 4th Dynasty (Old Kingdom period). Next to nothing is known about this ruler and some Egyptologists even believe him to be fictitious.

== Identity ==
=== Possible name sources ===
In attempts to reconstruct Ancient Egyptian king lists, Egyptologists and historians face several problems. As already mentioned, Bikheris is a Hellenized name variation. The name appears in the book Aegyptiaca written by Manetho around 300 BC. In a Latin copy of Manetho, written by Eratosthenes, a king named Biuris is placed at the date when Bikheris allegedly ruled. Scholars wonder if both names actually derive from one and the same Egyptian source.

However, ancient Egyptian sources are scarce. The oldest possible source of royal name may come from an unfinished pyramid shaft at Zawyet el'Aryan. The shaft was excavated in 1904 by Italian Egyptologist Alessandro Barsanti. He discovered several black ink inscriptions inside the shaft, some of which actually show a royal cartouche name. Unfortunately, Barsanti made no facsimile, but sloppy drawings and all but the cartouche name remains illegible. At least the second (lower) hieroglyph can be identified as a Ka-symbol, thus making the king's name a ...ka. A further inscription, No.55, mentions a possible Gold name: Neb hedjet-nwb, meaning "Lord of the Golden Crown". Some egyptologists propose that this is either the Horus name of king Huni or the Gold name of king Nebka. This, however, would implicate that the pyramid was built during the late 3rd Dynasty rather than the 4th.

The temporally next possible source appears in the famous Westcar Papyrus of the 13th Dynasty. The text mentions a king's son, Bau-ef-Ra. Scholars wonder if this Bauefre may be identical to Bikheris. A very similar name from the New Kingdom period can be found in a rock inscription at Wadi Hammamat. The inscription consists of an honorary prayer surmounted by a short king list. The list contains the names Khufu, Djedefra, Khafre, Djedefhor, and Baefra.

=== Identifications ===
Alan B. Lloyd is convinced that the names Baka, Bakare, Baefra, Bauefra and Biuris are all identical to Manetho's Bikheris. This, in turn, is doubted by Kim Ryholt, who points out that the names Baefra and Bauefra contain no syllable that would phonetically fit "Bikheris". Thus, Ba(u)efra and Bikheris might be two different kings. This view is strengthened by the fact that Bauefra is entitled in contemporary documents only as "king's son", which is the title of a prince, not that of a ruler.

The only Old Kingdom name that could indeed fit is the now incomplete name X-ka, as found at Zawyet el'Aryan. According to Peter Jánosi, the mysterious name could be a Baka, written with a ram symbol. A son of Djedefre was actually named Baka, his name was indeed written with a ram- and a ka-symbol. It might be possible that prince Baka was meant to become king on the royal throne, but then he died unexpectedly during his coronation year, leaving an unfinished tomb shaft. Maybe Baka changed his name from "Baka" into "Baka-Re" after his coronation, or perhaps it was done posthumously. If the theory is correct, Bikheris was the hellenized variant of Baka(re).

== Historical figure ==
Some scholars suspect that the line of throne successions during the 4th Dynasty of Egypt may have been much less smooth than mainstream Egyptologists believe. In support of this, they point out that it was already suspicious that king Djedefra broke with the family tradition of building royal tombs at Giza. In fact, Djedefra had left the Giza necropolis in an attempt to found a new royal cemetery at Abu Rawash instead. Alan B. Lloyd also points out that Djedefra dared another break with royal traditions by introducing the cult of Ra and placing Ra over all other deities. If Djedefra broke with family traditions, then Bikheris, as his son, may have done the same thing. This, and the obviously very short reign, may have led to Bikheris' exclusion from official records.

Another problem is how later historians depict the 4th Dynasty: Manetho and Eratosthenes both describe Bikheris as the sixth ruler of the 4th Dynasty and as the son and successor of king Djedefra. However, both authors chronologically misplace the kings completely since they give the succession Sneferu → Khufu → Khafre → Menkaure → Djedefre → Shepseskaf → Thamphthis; archaeological records however give the correct succession Sneferu → Khufu → Djedefre → Khafre → Menkaure → Shepseskaf. The reason for the numerous misplacements of kings in Hellenistic documents may be caused by the ancient authors' erroneous idea that the three builders of the Giza pyramids (Khufu, Khafre and Menkaure) automatically must have been direct throne successors. Also, the Hellenistic authors seem to have built the king list on the historical importance of each king: first the "famous pyramid builders" everyone knew at their time (because of their still practiced mortuary cults and their impressive monuments), then the "lesser important" followers.

Thus, most scholars are convinced that Bikheris, should he have existed, must have ruled either between Djedefra and Khafre, or between Khafre and Menkaure. Since Bikheris is described as the son and follower of Djedefra, a chronological position between Djedefra and Khafre seems possible. However, the Ramesside king lists provide evidence for placing Bikheris' reign between Khafre and Menkaure. The Saqqara king list provides a very odd sequence of succeeding kings for the 4th Dynasty: after king Khafre, the cartouches from him up to king Userkaf (the first ruler of the 5th Dynasty) are destroyed and thus illegible today. But their number is puzzling, since between Khafre and Userkaf only two kings are archaeologically detected: Menkaure and Shepseskaf. On the other hand, the Saqqara king list gives five cartouches between Khafre and Userkaf: Khafre → ??? → (Menkaure) → (Shepseskaf) → (Thamphthis) → ??? → Userkaf. One was possibly preserved for Bikheris, whilst the second may have been reserved for a king Thamphthis. The third cartouche (the one before Userkaf) remains a mystery. Jürgen von Beckerath proposes king Nyuserre as the holder of the third cartouche; he thinks it is possible that Nyuserre was simply misplaced to the beginning of the 5th Dynasty. The Saqqara king list would therefore give the following succession: Khafre → Bikheris → Menkaure → Shepseskaf → Thamphthis → Nyuserrê → Userkaf. However, in recent years, it's been thought that the holder of the third cartouche should actually be Queen Khentkaus; which would make the Saqqara king list succession be: Khafre → Bikheris → Menkaure → Shepseskaf → Thamphthis → Khentkaus → Userkaf.

The Royal Canon of Turin also provides an unusual sequence: after king Khafre, the papyrus on which the king list was written is damaged, and only a few year notes have survived. According to the numbers of preserved year notes, between Khafre and Menkaure a further king must have been listed, because an additional line starts with "king of Upper- and Lower Egypt" (the year notes here are damaged and illegible, though). The following year note about "18 years of rulership" must belong to king Menkaure. After Menkaure, 4 years of rulership are mentioned, this line was surely reserved for king Shepseskaf. After Shepseskaf, however, a further, additional year note gives "2 years of rulership" before starting the 5th Dynasty with Userkaf. Egyptologists think that the gap between Khafre and Menkaure once named either Bauefra or Bikheris and the gap between Shepseskaf and Userkaf may have mentioned Thamphthis.

== Reign length ==
The length of Bikheris' reign is subject to some dispute. Manetho credits Bikheris with 22 years of rulership, Eratosthenes gives Biuris 10 years and the Royal Canon of Turin provides 2 years. Modern Egyptologists and historians believe Manetho's and Eratosthenes' year numbers to be exaggerations or misinterpretations. They credit Bikheris with a reign of either 2 years (likewise to the Turin Canon) or even less than one year (as Peter Jánosi suggests). Such a short reign would explain why Bikheris left virtually no monuments and/or documents.

== Burial ==
The tomb of Bikheris is unknown. If he is indeed identical to the archaeologically attested prince Baka, he might have been buried in the Unfinished Northern Pyramid of Zawyet el'Aryan. This tomb was left unfinished right after the foundation was completed--only an oval-shaped, imbedded sarcophagus was found. The condition of the tomb suggests the sudden death of the king, which forced the tomb workers to leave the necropolis behind. The unfinished tomb would therefore fit well to a supposed short-lived ruler such as Bikheris.
