= Khentetka =

W17 X1 X1 N35 D28
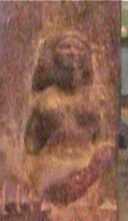
- Queen Khentetka shown kneeling next to King Djedefre. Part of a colossal seated statue of the King.

Queen consort of Egypt
- King: Djedefre
- Spouse: Djedefre
- Dynasty: 4th Dynasty of Egypt
- Religion: Ancient Egyptian Religion

Khentetka or Khentetenka (fl. 26th century BCE) was a queen consort of Egypt; the wife of King Djedefre during the 4th Dynasty.

== Biography ==
Khentetka's titles include King's Beloved Wife (ḥm.t-nỉswt mrỉỉt=f), She who sees Horus and Set (m33.t-ḥrw-stš), Attendant of Horus (ḫt-ḥrw), Priestess of Neith (ḥm.t-nṯr nt).

It is not known who Khentetka's parents were. Khentetka was the wife of the 4th Dynasty king Djedefre and it is possible she was the mother of some of his children. Djedefre had another wife named Hetepheres. Djedefre had four sons (Hornit, Baka, Setka, and Nikaudjedefre) and two daughters (Hetepheres C and Neferhetepes) but it is not known if Khentetka or Hetepheres (or even another woman) was the mother of these children. It has been suggested that Princess Neferhetepes was the daughter of Djedefre by Hetepheres.

== Statues and burial ==
Khentetka is known from statues found at Abu Rawash. She is depicted kneeling beside the foot of king Djedefre. (Because of Egyptian art's use of hierarchical proportion, her figure is unnaturally tiny compared to the king's.) A structure in the southwest corner of Djedefre's pyramid complex at Abu Rawash has been suggested as a possible burial place for Khentetka. Maragioglio and Rinaldi believe it may be the pyramid belonging to the Queen consort, and could belong to Queen Khentetka.

It is not entirely clear however what the purpose of the pyramid was. Stadelmann and Jonosi believe it to be a cult pyramid. The cult pyramid usually stood in the southeast corner of the pyramid complex. The general orientation of the pyramid complex of Djedefre is north-west however and not east-south as is more common. The difference in orientation may mean the cult pyramid may not be located in its usual position, and the structure could be the cult pyramid for Djedefre's pyramid complex. Further excavations will be required to shed light on this question.
