= Pierre Lacau =

French archaeologist and egyptologist

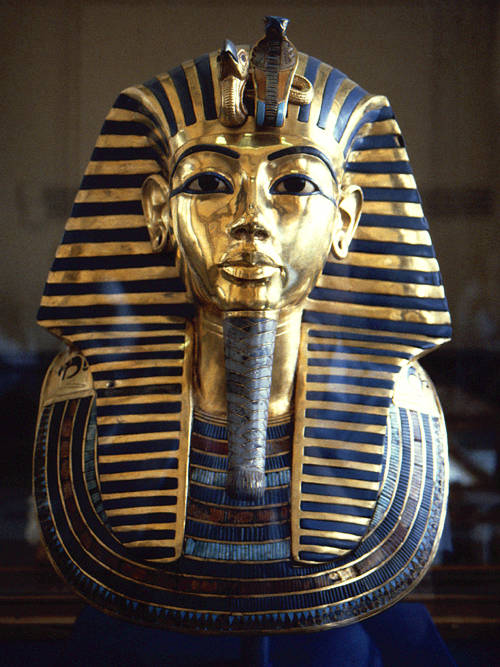
Death-mask of Tutankhamun.

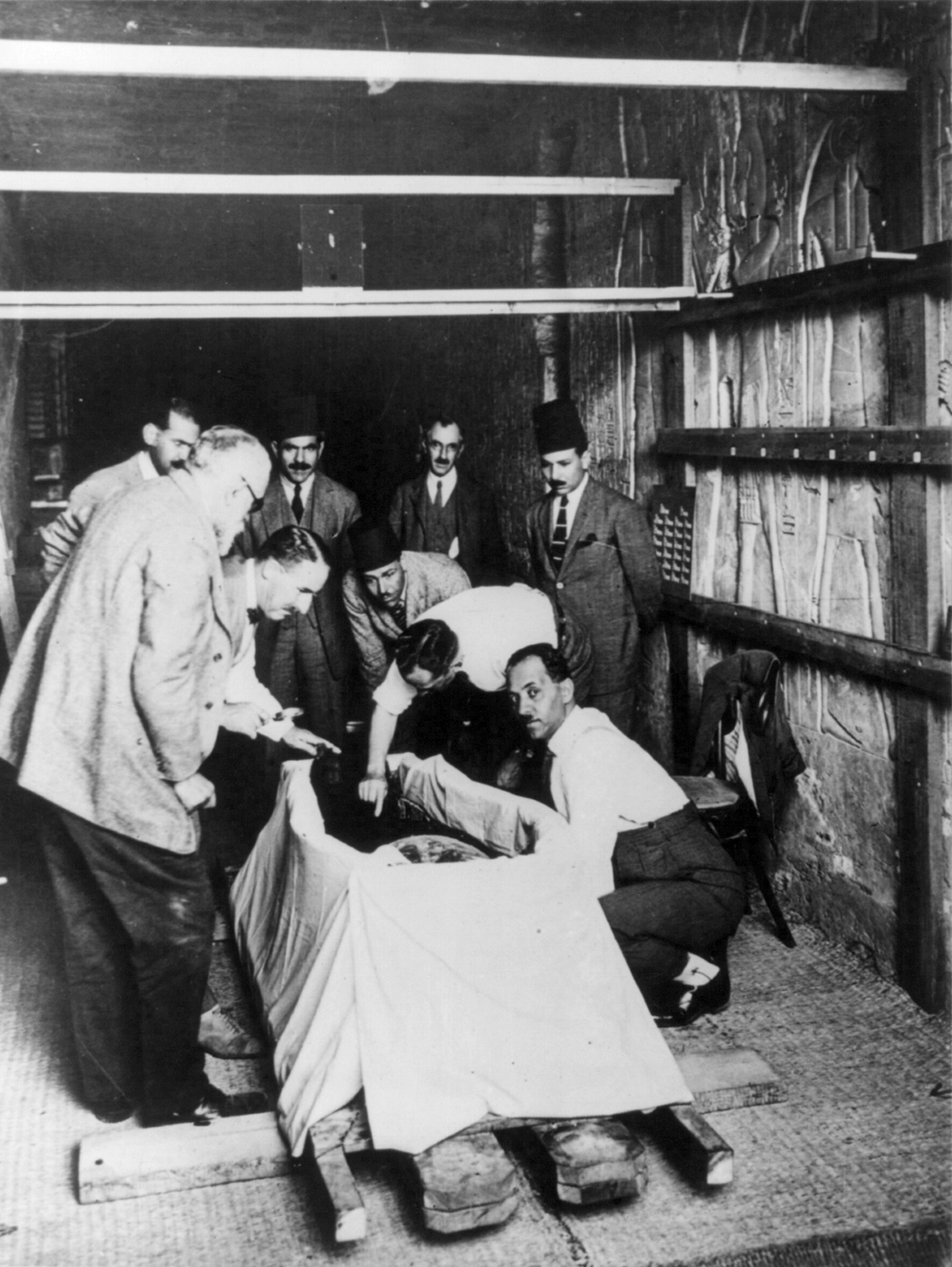
Pierre Lacau (far left), watching Tutankhamun's mummy being unwrapped. Douglas Derry makes the first incision in the examination of observed by several others including Lacau, Carter (with magnifying glass) and Saleh Bey Hamdi (far right).

Pierre Lacau (25 November 1873 – 26 March 1963) was a French Egyptologist and philologist. He served as Egypt's director of antiquities from 1914 until 1936, and oversaw the 1922 discovery of the tomb of Tutankhamun in the Valley of the Kings by Howard Carter.

== Early life ==
Pierre Lacau was born in the French commune of Brie-Comte-Robert. He was raised and educated as a Jesuit.

== Career ==
Lacau's first appointment in Cairo was to the International Commission for drafting the general catalogue of the Museum of Cairo.

In 1912 he was appointed director of the French Institute of Eastern Archaeology, succeeding Émile Chassinat, whose work he continued by excavating new structures within Abu Rawash, the funerary complex of Djedefre to the east of the pyramids of Giza.

From 1914 to 1936 he served as director general of the Department of Antiquities of Egypt. He was appointed in 1914 to succeed Gaston Maspero but could not take up the position until after World War I. He immediately announced that excavation concessions would be limited to representatives of public institutions and societies. He then reinterpreted the law covering division of finds so that the Egyptian National Museum could take all unique finds and give the excavator all the rest.

Lacau oversaw the discovery of the tomb of Tutankhamun in 1922 by the English archaeologists Howard Carter and Lord Carnarvon in the Valley of the Kings. Relations with Carter were rarely cordial and were exacerbated by both the monopoly of publication rights which Lord Carnarvon sold to The Times, and pressure from the Egyptian government who resented the lack of Egyptian involvement in the Tutankhamen excavation.

In 1924 Lacau, acting under the orders of the new Minister of Public Works, forbade the wives of Howard Carter's team to enter the tomb. Carter closed the tomb in protest, locked it, refused to hand over the keys, and posted an explanatory notice in the Old Winter Palace Hotel, Luxor, thus breaking the terms of his license and relinquishing full control to Lacau.

In 1938 Lacau was appointed professor at the Collège de France in Paris, where he held the chair in Egyptology until 1947; he was elected to the Academy of Inscriptions and Belles Lettres in 1939.

== In popular culture ==
Lacau was portrayed by Valentine Pelka in the 2005 BBC docudrama Egypt, and Nicolas Beaucaire in the 2016 ITV drama Tutankhamun.

== Publications ==
- General Catalogue of Egyptian Antiquities Museum in Cairo. Sarcophagi before the New Kingdom. Published by the French Institute of Oriental Archaeology, 1904.
- Pierre Lacau / Jean-Philippe Lauer, excavations at Saqqara. The step pyramid. Volume V. Inscriptions in ink on Vases. Published by the French Institute of Oriental Archaeology, 1965.
- Pierre Lacau 1933. Une stèle juridique de Karnak. SASAE 13. Cairo.
- Pierre Lacau / Henri Chevrier 1956. Une Chapelle de Sésostris Ier à Karnak. I.Cairo.
