= Baka (prince) =

Possible Egyptian Pharaoh or Prince

- Bikheris?
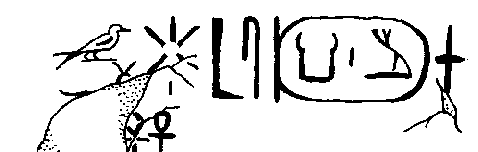
- Baka

Pharaoh (disputed)
- Reign: c. 2570 BC
Royal titulary
Nomen
Ba-Ka
B3 k3
His soul is (in) his Ka

G39 N5	E10 D28
- Dynasty: 4th Dynasty

Baka (fl. c. 2570 BC) was an ancient Egyptian prince. He is known for his destroyed statuette. He is also the subject of a theory that claims he was king of Egypt for a very short time. Thus, he might be identical to a scarcely known king named Bikheris.

== Identity ==
Baka was a prince and son of king Djedefre. He lived and worked during the 4th Dynasty. His family life is unknown, and the names of his wives and children are lost. Since the names of three other sons of Djedefre, namely Setka, Harnit and Nykau-Djedefre, are archaeologically attested, these should be Baka's brothers or half-brothers. The daughters of Djedefre, Hetepheres III and Neferhetepes, would be Baka's sisters or half-sisters. His mother is unknown, too. She could be one of Djedefre's wives, Khentetka or Hetepheres II, but this is highly uncertain.

== Possible reign as king ==
According to Rainer Stadelmann and George Reisner, it is possible that Baka was a king of Egypt for a very short time (maybe one or two years). Their assumption is based on the so-called Unfinished Northern Pyramid of Zawyet el'Aryan, which is located at Zawyet el'Aryan. This unfinished pyramid shaft was abandoned shortly after being started and only a dozen of workmen's inscriptions in black ink were found. These provide a royal cartouche name, which remains partially illegible. The first sign can be identified as a Ka-sign, but the first (and former) sign was copied by the pyramid excavator so fuzzily that it remains undecipherable. According to Stadelmann and Reisner, the first sign shows a walking ram, as it does in the birth name of the prince.The theory postulates Baka simply put his citizen name into a royal cartouche due to his lifetime, but then the name was changed after his death into Bakarê ("soul and Ka of Râ"). It is theorized that this name of Baka was hellenized into Bikheris in ancient Greek chronics. For this reason, Rainer calls the unfinished tomb shaft at Zawyet el'Aryan the "Pyramid of Bikheris".

This theory is not commonly accepted, though. Aidan Dodson is convinced of the depiction of a sitting Seth-animal, reading the royal name as Seth-Ka ("Seth is mine Ka"). In this case, Setka had actually followed his father onto the throne.
