= Itysen =

Ancient Egyptian prince

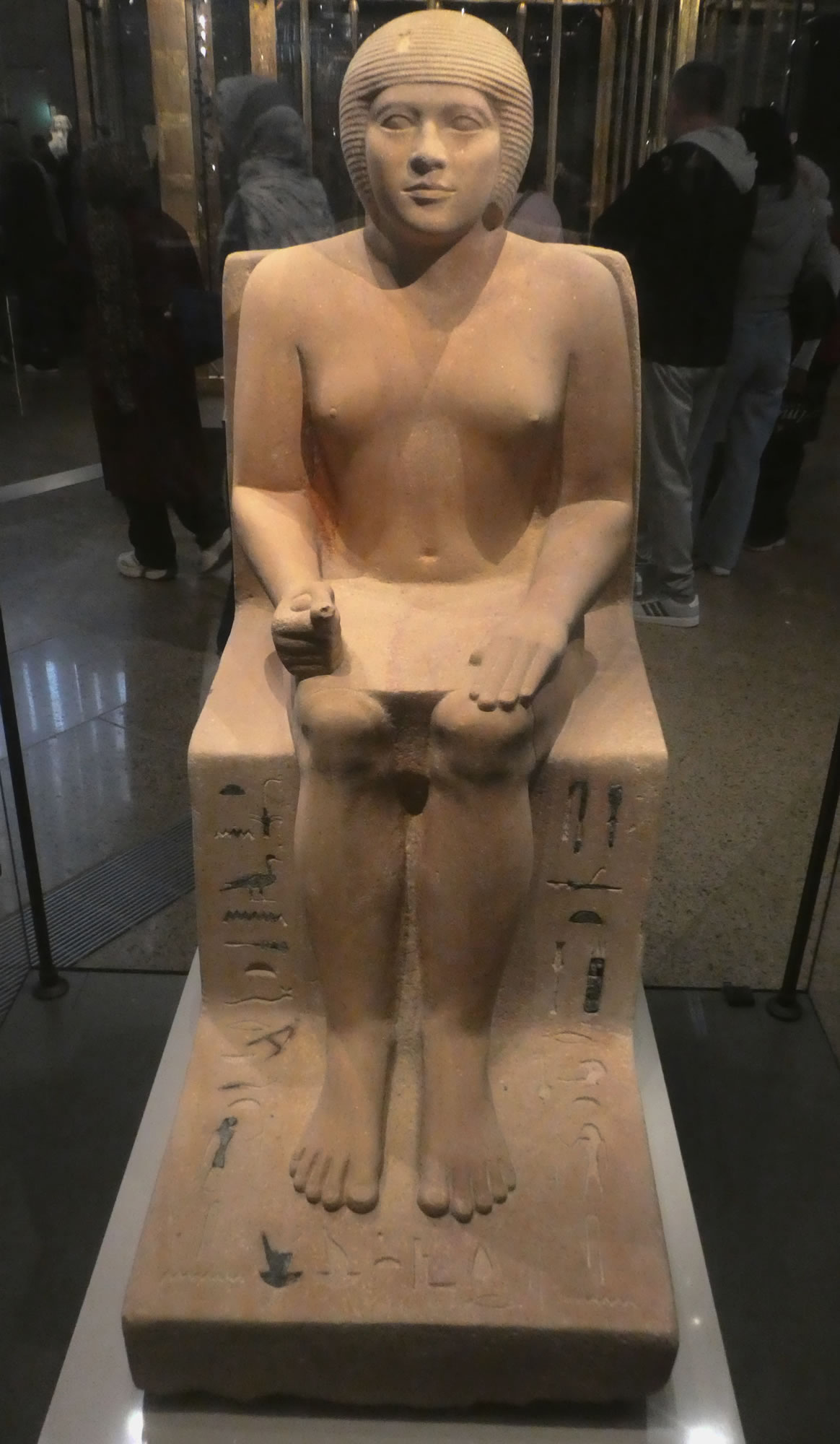
Statue of Itysen

Itysen (fl. c. 2600 BC) was an Ancient Egyptian official and perhaps king's son of the 4th Dynasty or early Fifth Dynasty. Itysen was king's son of his body, beloved of his lord, friend friend. adorner of the place o the white and red crown. keeper of the headdress and leader of the palace.

Itysen is known from a statue that was found during rescue excavations at Abu Roash. At this place there is the pyramid of king Djedefre and therefore it is possible that Itysen was the son of that king.

The statue is made of sandstone and shows a sitting man with a youthful face and with the body of an obese person. It is 85 cm high. Inscriptions provide is name and titles. The statue is now in the Grand Egyptian Museum. (mo/ 1506).

== Literature ==
Mostafa Waziry and Mohamed El-Seaidyː Private Old Kingdom statue of Ity-sen at Abu Rawash. In MiroslavBárta, Zahi Hawass, and Mohamed Megahed (eds), Living at the wall: studies in honor of Mark Lehner, Prague: Charles University, Faculty of Arts 2024, ISBN 9788076711648, pp. 405-413.
