= Djedefre =

Egyptian Pharaoh of the 4th Dynasty

- Djedefra, Radjedef
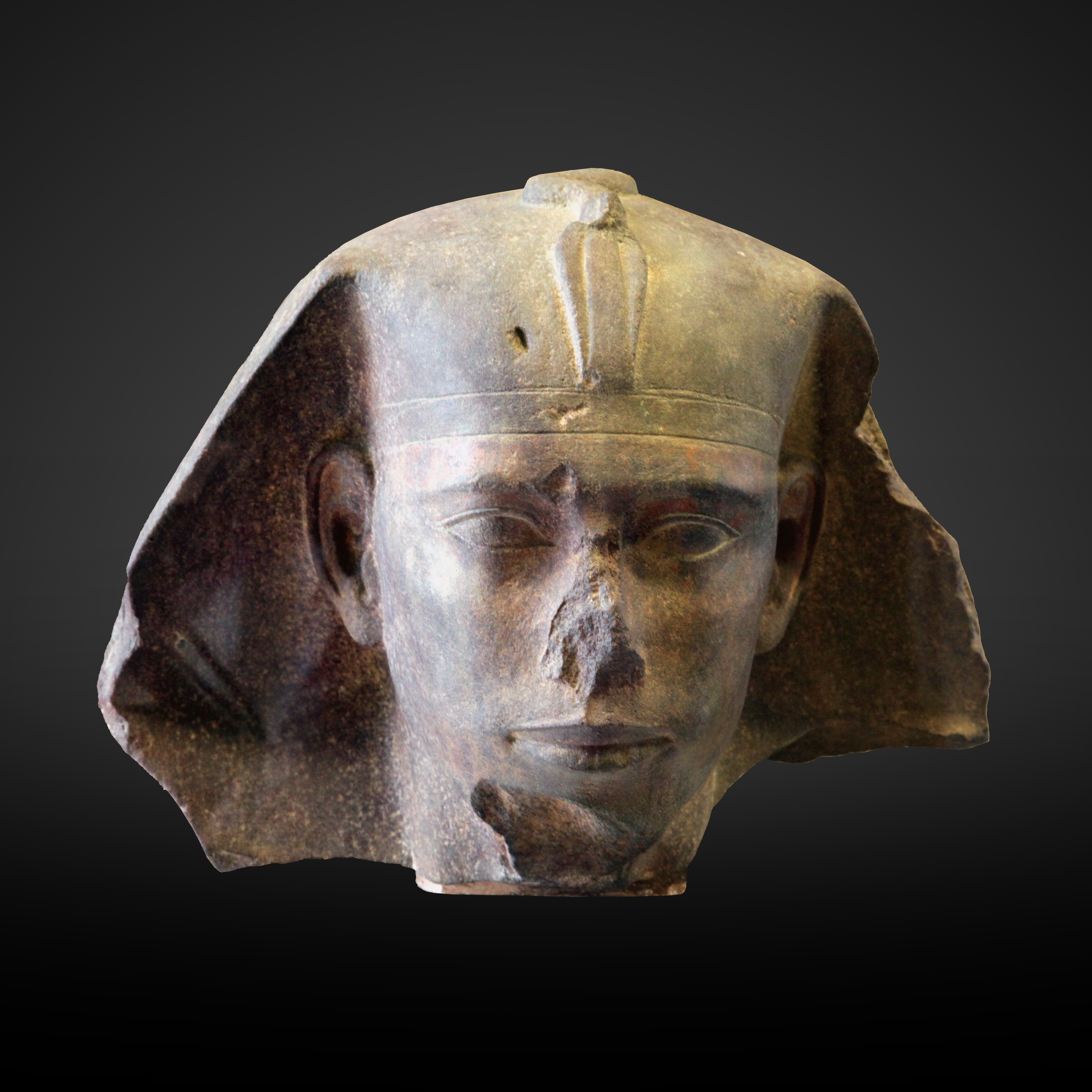
- Quartzite head of a sphinx of Djedefre from Abu Rawash, Musée du Louvre

Pharaoh
- Reign: 7 to 23 years c. middle 3rd Millennium BC
- Predecessor: Khufu
- Successor: Khafre
Royal titulary
Horus name
Hor-Kheper
Ḥr-ḫpr
Embodiment of Horus
G5	L1
Nebty name
Kheper-im-nebti
Ḫpr-m-nb.tj
Embodied in the Two Ladies
G16	L1 G17
Golden Horus
Bikju-nebu
Bjk.jw-nb.w
The most golden falcon
G5 G5 G5 S12
Prenomen
Abydos King List
Djedefre
Ḏd.f Rˁ
He endures like Ra
< N5 R11 f >
Saqqara Tablet
Djedefre
Ḏḏ.f Rˁ
He endures like Ra
< N5 R11 R11 f >
Nomen
Djedefre
Sȝ Rˁ ḏd.f Rˁ
The son of Ra, he endures like Ra

G39 N5	N5 R11 f
- Consorts: Hetepheres II, Khentetka
- Children: Hornit, Setka, and Neferhetepes
- Father: Khufu
- Burial: Pyramid of Djedefre
- Monuments: Pyramid of Djedefre, Great Sphinx of Giza ?
- Dynasty: 4th Dynasty

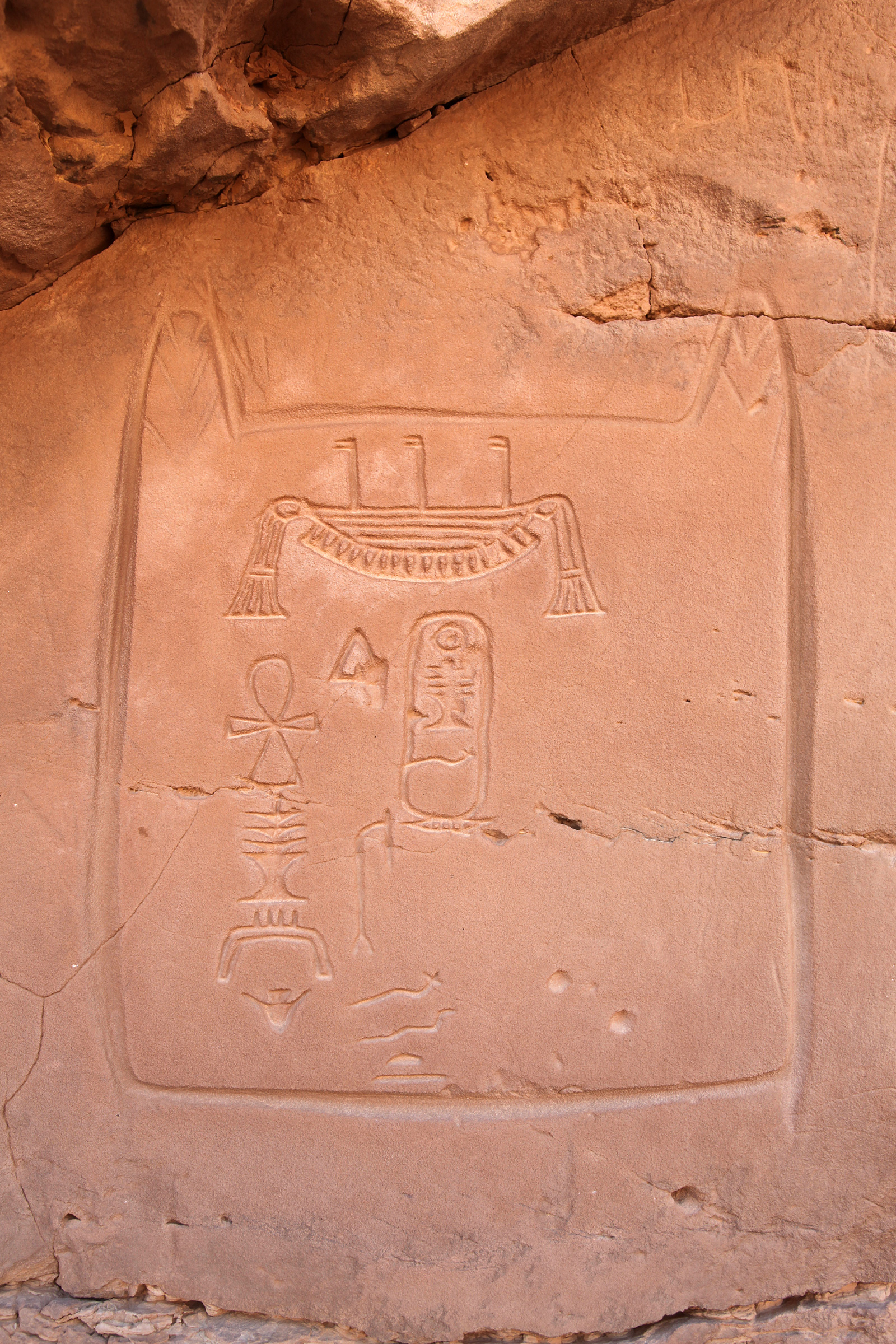
Inscription IV-C: Personal name of Djedefre in a mountain hieroglyph, Water Mountain of Djedefre, New Valley, Western Desert, Egypt

Djedefre (also Djedefra and Radjedef) was an ancient Egyptian king (pharaoh) of the 4th Dynasty during the Old Kingdom. He ruled sometime in the middle of the 3rd Millennium BC. Djedefre was the son and immediate throne successor of Khufu, the builder of the Great Pyramid of Giza; his mother is not known for certain. He is the king who introduced the royal title Sa-Rê (meaning “Son of Ra”) and the first to connect his cartouche name with the sun god Ra. His name is said to mean "Enduring like Re" and his Horus name was Kheper which is said to mean "Horus Appears". Based on the lost work Chronographiai by Sextus Julius Africanus (c. 160–240), possibly inspired by earlier work of Manetho (c. 290–260 BC), of which some later translations have survived it was early on suggested that the throne name of Djedefre was Ratoises.

Not to be confused with the 5th Dynasty ruler Djedkare Isesi.

== Family ==
While it is known that Djedefre was the son of 4th Dynasty ruler Khufu the rest of his genealogy is not fully certain with much being speculation. He is believed to have been the son of Khufu, either with second (possibly third) wife Khentetka or first wife Meritites I. As such his purported known siblings (or half siblings) would have been:

- Hetepheres II - a princess who married brother (or half brother) Kawab then married Djedefre (though this may have been honorary).
- Khafre - 4th Dynasty ruler
- Djedefhor (also Hordjedef) - a prince about which little is known. He is thought to be buried in tomb "G 7210 +7220" of the Giza East Field.
- Meresankh II - a princess who is thought to have married (possibly half brother) Horbaef. It has been suggested that she then married Djedefre or Khafre. Buried in tomb "G 7410 +7420" of the Giza East Field.
- Kawab - a prince known to have married his sister Hetepheres II. Thought to be buried in tomb "G 7110 +7120" of the Giza East Field.

with others suggested as possible including Horbaef, Khufukhaf (who may actually be Khafre) and Minkhaf

Like much in the history of the 4th Dynasty of Egypt the wives of Djedefre are not known with complete certainty. It is generally believed that he married his sister Hetepheres II (though this has been questioned) and Khentetenka. A number of possible children of Djedefre have been proposed with varying degrees of textual support:

- Hornit - based on a partial offering table found in mastaba F-13 in the Djedefre cemetery and two limestone statue bases and one statue (Cairo CG 544) all of unknown provenance (Cairo CG 57013 and Louvre E. 12630 93).
- Setka - known from a scribe statue found in his father's pyramid complex. It is possible that he ruled for a short while after his father's death; an unfinished pyramid at Zawiyet el-Arian was started for a ruler whose name ends in ka; this could have been Setka or Baka.
- Neferhetepes ("Her Peace/Grace Is Beautiful") - known from a statue fragment from Abu Rowash. Until recently, she was believed to be the mother of a pharaoh of the next dynasty, either Userkaf or Sahure.
- Baka/Bakai - based on a scribe statue base (CG 57004) from the eastern annex of the royal temple and a statue (CG 176 [photo 15]) of unknown provenance. It has been suggested that this is Bikheris.
- Itysen - known from a statue found at Abu Roash.
- Nikaou-Rêdjedef - based on a false door (Louvre E. 16263) in Tomb F15 in the Djedefre cemetery.

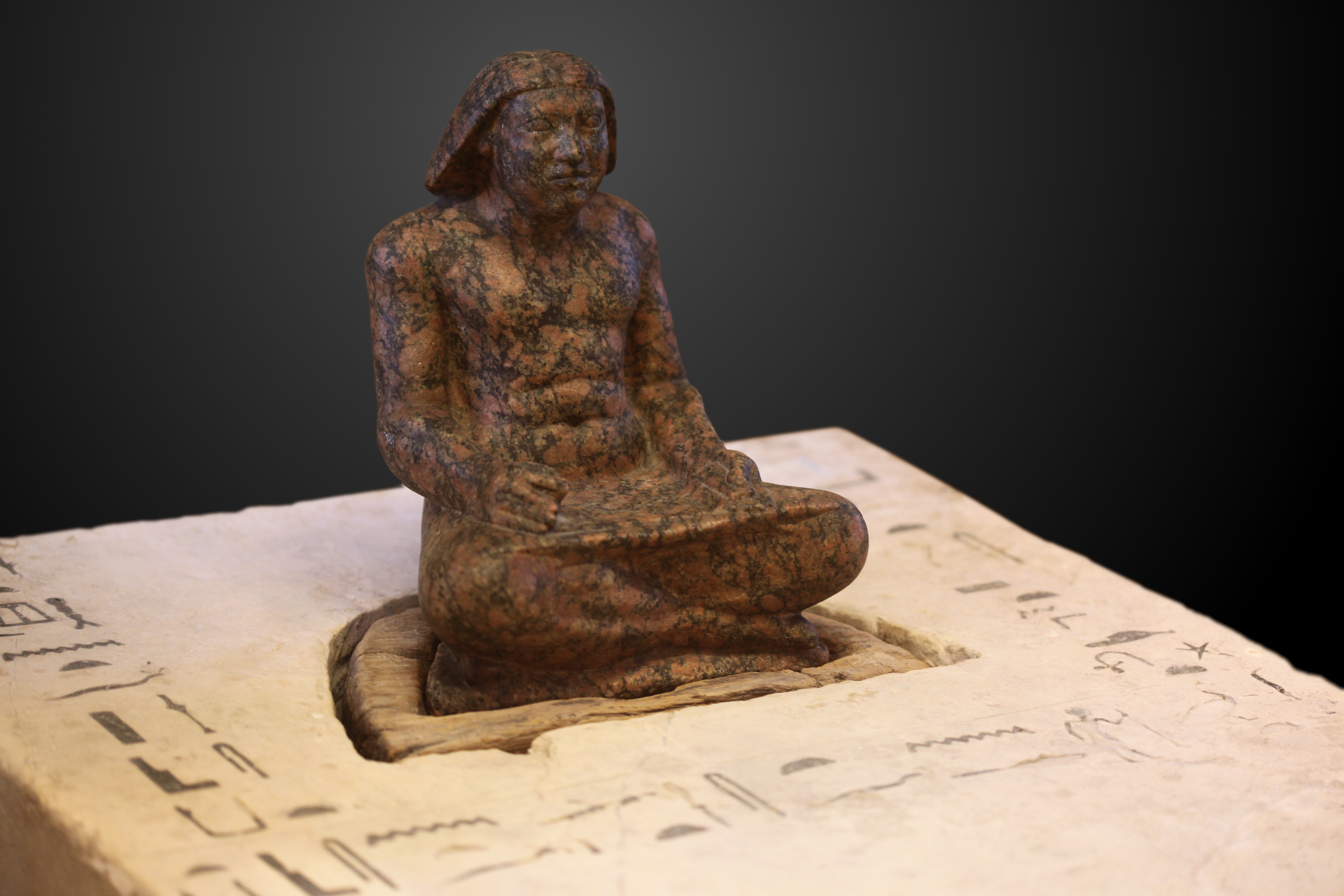
Statue of Setka inscribed with his name and titles, in the Louvre

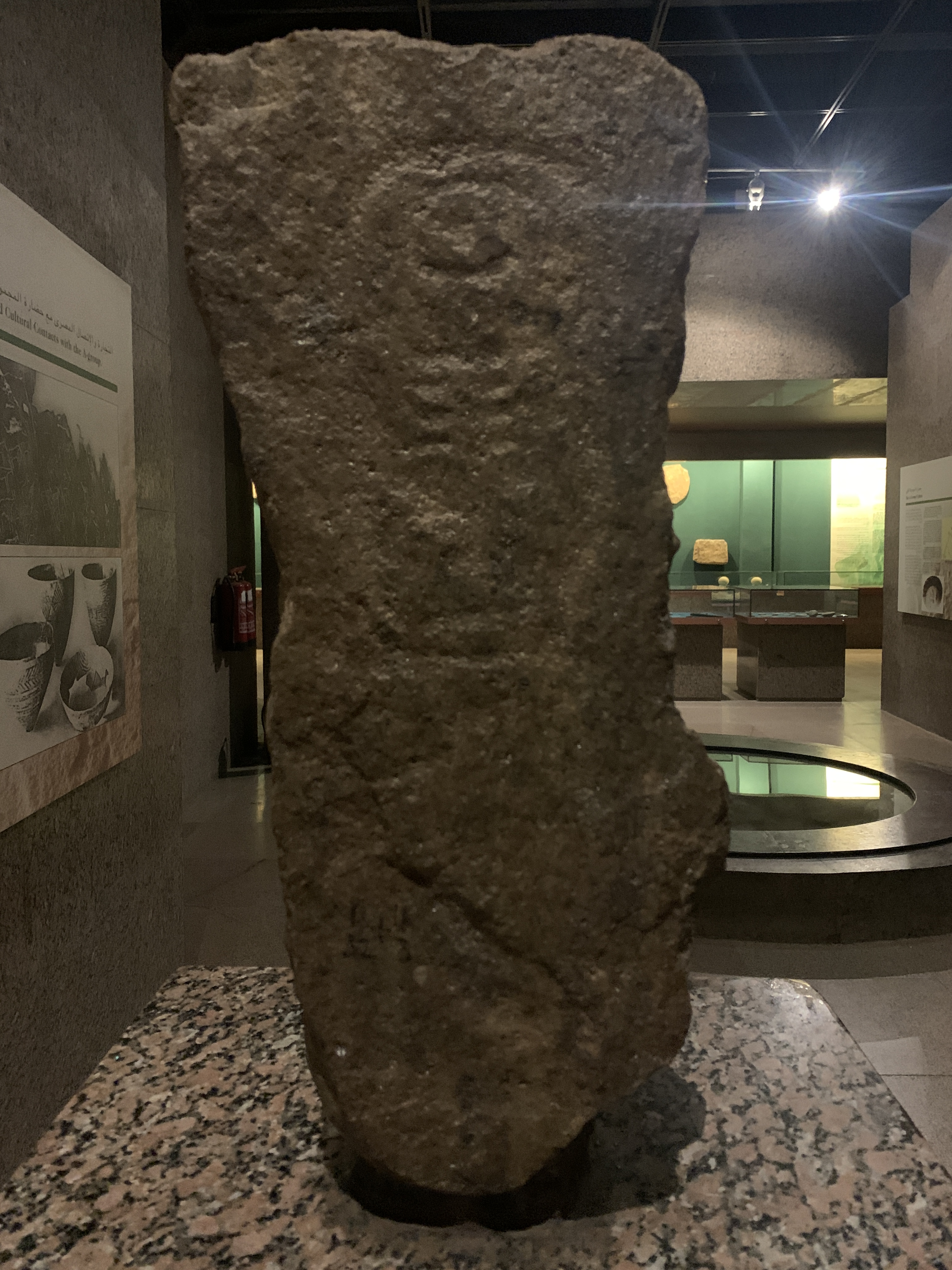
Block inscribed with the cartouche of king Djedefre - Nubian Museum

== Reign ==
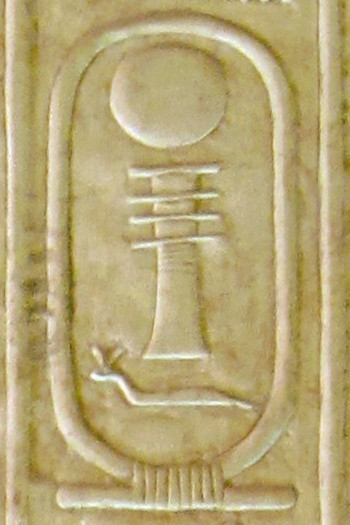
Cartouche name of Djedefre in the Abydos-List - name shows honorific transposition, being written in the order Ra-Djed-Ef

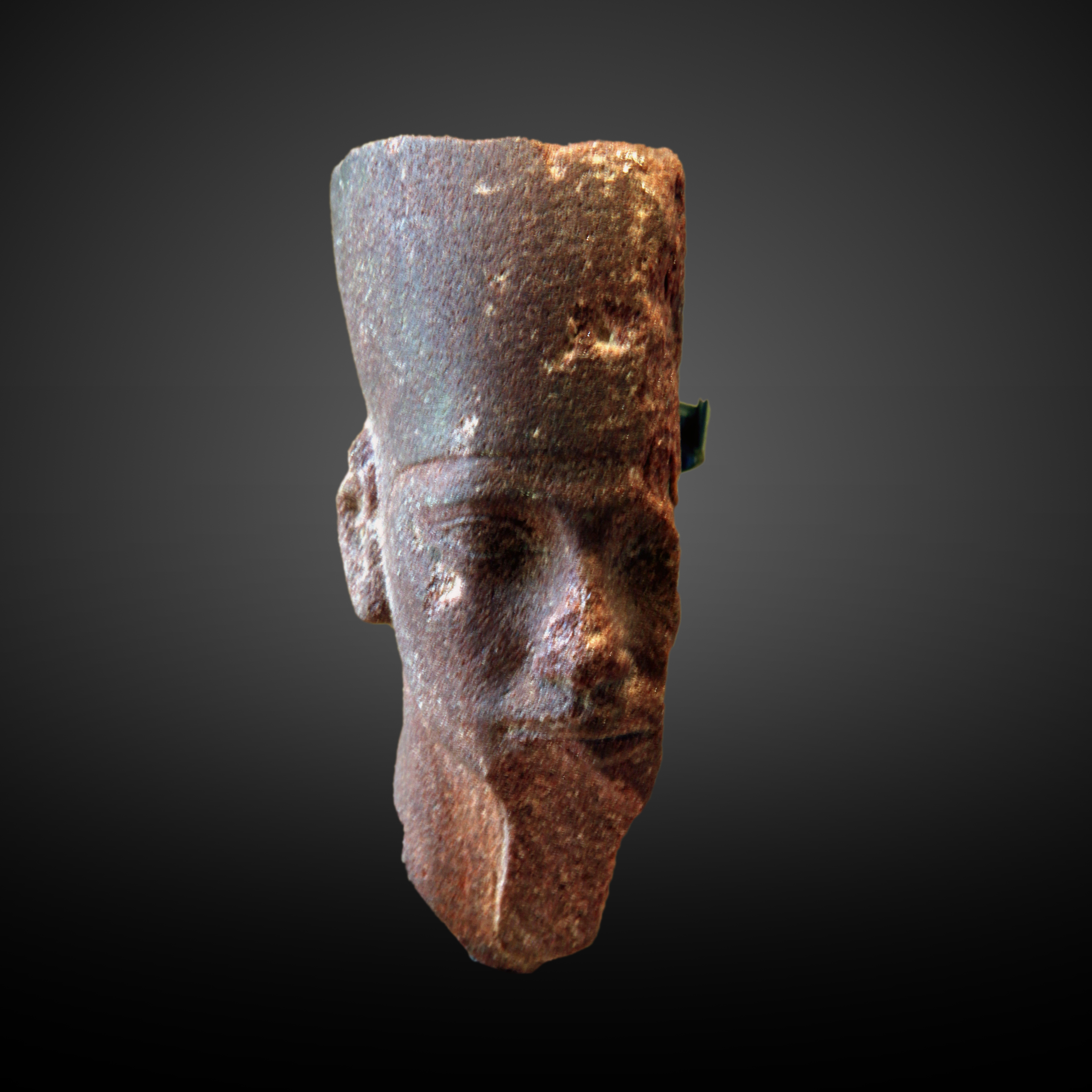
Red Quartzite head of Djedefre, likely a part of a Ka statue, in the Louvre

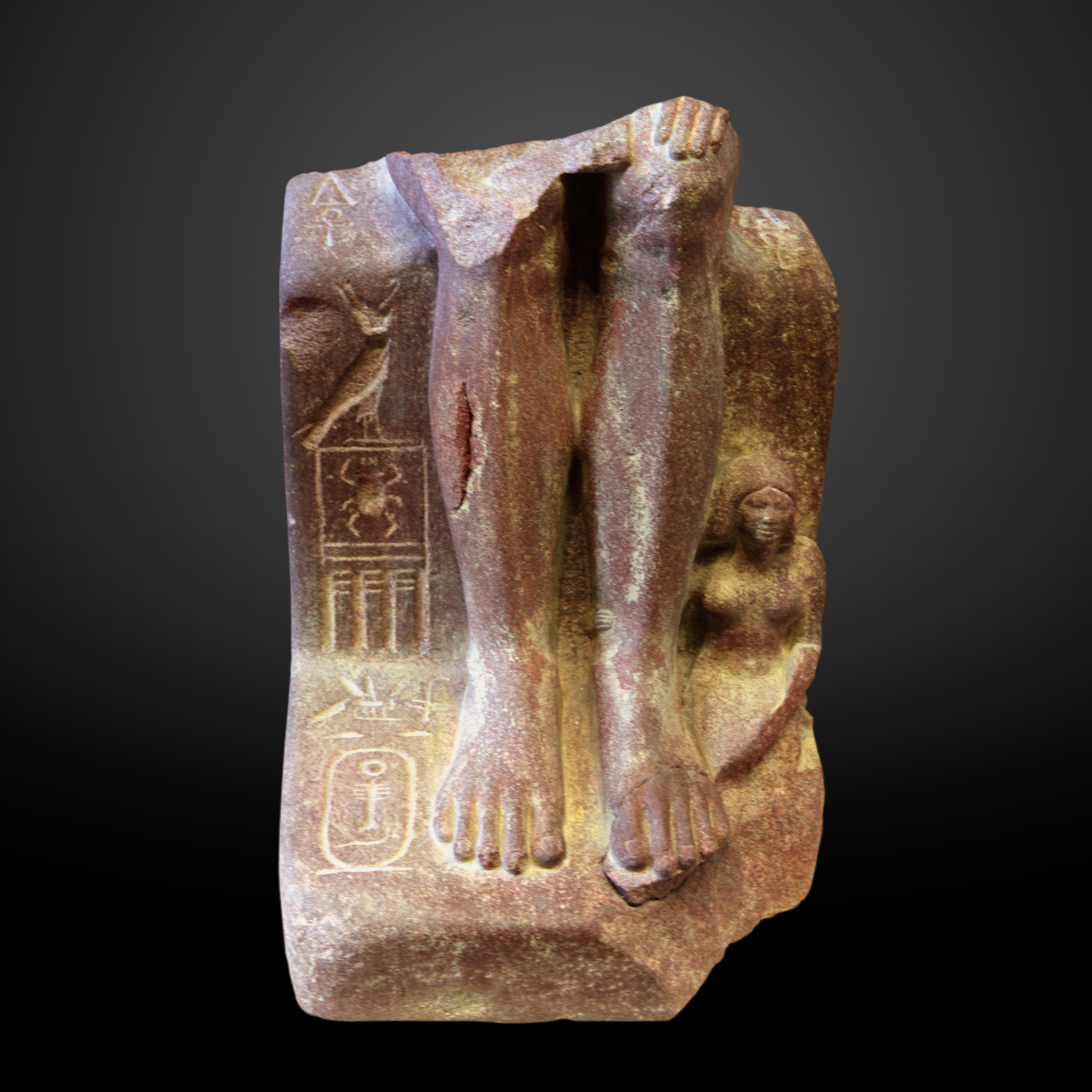
Red Quartzite feet of a statue of Djedefre, likely a part of a Ka statue, in the Louvre. The statue fragment also includes his Horus name Kheper, alongside a cartouche of his name.

In the early days of archaeology the numerous errors in the works of Herodotus on this subject caused much confusion on the names and order of 4th Dynasty rulers.

Djedefre is usually given a reign of between 7 and 9 years. An inscription, thought to be of Djedefre, was found written on the underside of one of the massive roofing-block beams which covered Khufu's southern boat-pits at Giza by Egyptian work crews. The inscription read "the year after the 11th count, 1st month of Peret, 24th day’" which suggests that he reigned for at least 11 years and even at least 23 years (this is based on whether the cattle count is annual or biannual which is uncertain). The attribution to Djedefre has been disputed. It has been noted that the marks and inscriptions of the blocks from Khufu's boat pit seem to form a coherent collection relating to the different stages of the same building project realised by Djedefre's crews.

It has been noted that the French-Swiss team excavating Djedefre's pyramid have discovered that this king's pyramid was really finished in his reign. Djedefre's pyramid largely made use of a natural rock promontory which represented around 45% of its core; the side of the pyramid was 200 cubits long and its height was 125 cubits. The original volume of the monument of Djedefre, hence, approximately equalled that of Menkaura's own pyramid. Therefore, the argument that Djedefre enjoyed a short reign because his pyramid was unfinished is somewhat discredited.

It has been suggested that a currently unidentified 4th Dynasty pharaoh who was buried in Zawiyet al-Aryan immediately preceded or followed Djedefre.

== Pyramid complex ==
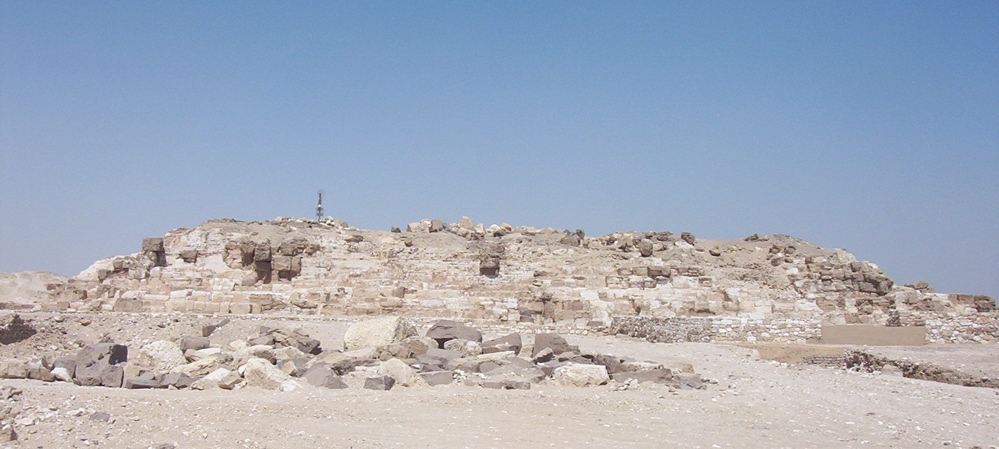
The ruined pyramid of Djedefre at Abu Rawash

Djedefre continued the move north in the location of pyramids by building his (now ruined) pyramid at Abu Rawash, some 8 kilometres (5.0 mi) to the north of Giza. It is the northernmost part of the Memphite necropolis. Abu Rawash plateau is 160 meters above sea level and would have been visible from Heliopolis 22 kilometers away and resulted in the pyramid of Djedefre being the highest in Egypt. The plateau is divided into two parts with the 4th Dynasty remains being on the Western side. Objects with the names of First Dynasty Kings Aha and Den have been found in the eastern section. To the east of the pyramid of Djedefre there is a cemetery of nobles from his reign (Cemetery F). Cemetery F was excavated by Fernand Bisson de La Roque from 1922 until 1924 and by Marcelle Baud from 2003 until 2008 and 25 large brick mastabas from the 1st dynasty reign of Den were found.

Nearby is another structure, Lepsius 1, which is either the base of an unfinished pyramid or of a mastaba, both have been suggested. It was examined in 1985 by Nabil Swelim who deemed it a 3rd Dynasty construct but that is uncertain.

Abu Rawash was described by Howard Vyse, of the Prussian Expedition in 1837. The site was surveyed in the mid and late 1800s by Karl Richard Lepsius and by Flinders Petrie. Émile Chassinat worked at the site in around 1900 followed by Pierre Lacau in 1912-1913. In modern times it was surveyed by Maragioglio, Vito, and Celeste A. Rinaldi. Extensive excavations were conducted by Michel Valloggia in 1995-2007. During the modern excavation a foundation hoard containing a copper axe and two stones inscribed "Year of the 1st Payment, 3rd Month of Winter Time" were found.

Modern excavation found a block "Year 1 of the count, 3rd month of Peret" in the descending corridor of Djedefre's pyramid indicating he began his construction early in his reign. The pyramid would have originally measured 106 meters by 106 meters with a height of 67 meters. The lower courses were clad in pink granite. The burial pit was cased in limestone and then pink granite and was covered by three courses of granite beams laid in chevron. The pyramid was constructed by first excavating a T-shaped pit with a 6 meter wide and 49 meter long descending north-south corridor. This led to a 21 meter deep east-west shaft (which tapered from 23 meters by 10 meters to 21 meters by 8 meters). The pyramid superstructure was then constructed of masonry. This made construction simpler but also facilitated looting of the stonework in later eras. The burial chamber had a base area of 6.83 meters by 3.15 meters.

While Egyptologists previously assumed that his pyramid at this heavily denuded site was unfinished upon his death, more recent excavations from 1995 to 2005 have established that it was indeed completed. The most recent evidence indicates that its current state is the result of extensive plundering in later periods. The destruction started at the end of the New Kingdom at the latest, and was particularly intense during the Roman and early Christian eras c. 2,000 years ago) when a Coptic monastery was built in nearby Wadi Karin, while "the king's statues [were] smashed as late as the 2nd century AD." As a result of Djedefre's pyramid being quarried for its stone, as such, there is little left standing today. It has been proven, moreover, that at the end of the nineteenth century, stone was still being hauled away at the rate of three hundred camel loads a day.

Next to the pyramid, which has a volume of 131,043 cubic meters, there is a rock cut boat pit which measures 35 meters in length.

In 2019, in a burial pit 1.8 kilometers to the east of the pyramid and funerary complex of Djedefre, two statues were found. One of stone held the name of Djedefre and the other, made of Egyptian acacia wood, is also believed to be of that pharaoh.
