= Neferhetepes =

Egyptian princess

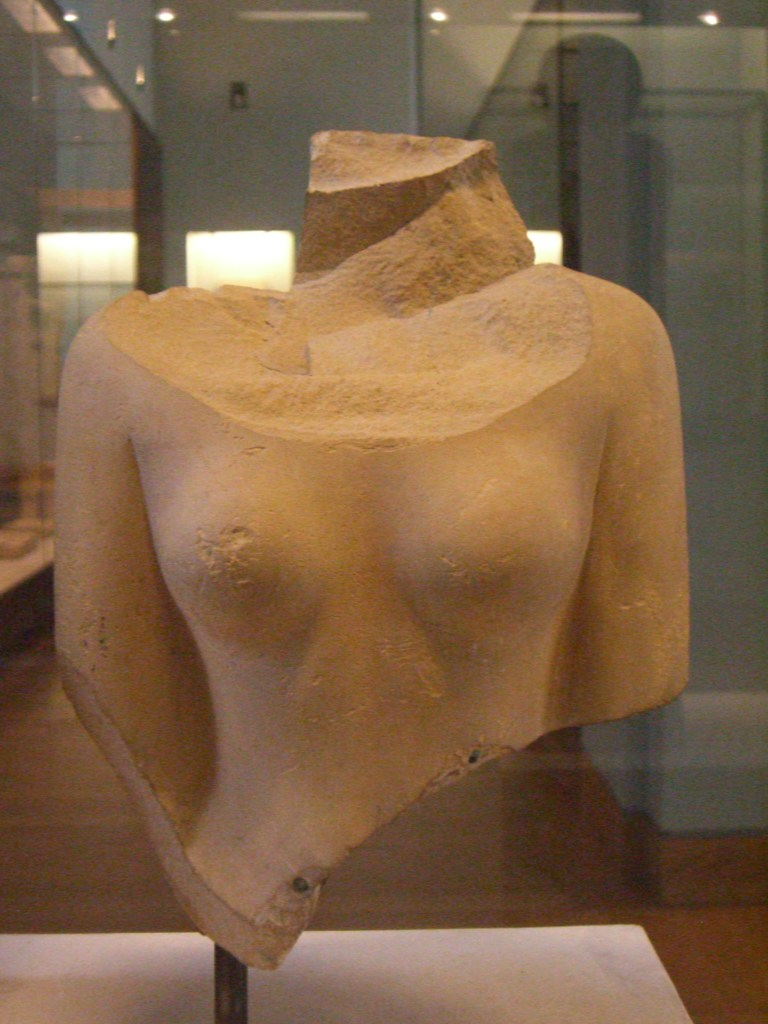
Statue of Neferhetepes,Louvre Museum

Neferhetepes (nefer-hetep-es; nfr-ḥtp-s, "Her Peace/Grace Is Beautiful") was an ancient Egyptian princess of the 4th Dynasty; a daughter of Pharaoh Djedefre who ruled between his father Khufu and his brother Khafre. Her mother was Hetepheres II.

== Biography ==
The name of Neferhetepes is known to us from a statue fragment found in Abu Rawash where her father had a pyramid complex built. She had the titles King's Daughter of His Body and God's Wife.

Neferhetepes was also a Priestess of Hathor, mistress of the sycamore (hemet-netjer-hut-hor nebet-nehet, ḥmt-nṯr-ḥwt-ḥr nb.t-nht). She is the earliest attested priestess of Hathor. The title appears on the base of a statue from Abu Rawash.

nfr Htp t p s
Neferhetepes
in hieroglyphs
Era: Old Kingdom
(2686–2181 BC)

Neferhetepes has been proposed as the mother of pharaoh Shepseskaf by Ariel P. Kozloff, although for Vivienne Gae Callender there is no evidence in support of this hypothesis.

Until recently, Egyptologists thought it as possible that Neferhetepes was identical to a woman of the same name who was buried in a small pyramid next to the pyramid of Userkaf, the first king of the 5th Dynasty. In a document mentioning her funerary cult, Neferhetepes is mentioned as having the title King's Mother but she didn't bear the title of King's Wife. Since her chapel was modified under the reign of Sahure, second king of the Fifth Dynasty (whose name was found on a fragment in the chapel), it is likely that she was the mother of either Userkaf or Sahure; the other king is the son of Khentkaus I. However, most recently, reliefs were found near the causeway of king Sahure's pyramid. They show that there was a second woman with the name Neferhetepes, wife of Userkaf and mother of Sahure. She lived into the reign of the latter and is therefore most likely not identical with the princess, but is identical to the woman buried in the pyramid next to that of Userkaf.

== See also ==
- Neferhetepes, wife of Userkaf

== Sources ==
- Callender, Vivienne Gae (1994). "Part III. A prosopographical register of the wives of the Egyptian Kings (Dynasties I–XVII)". The wives of the Egyptian kings: dynasties I–XVII. Macquarie University. School of History, Philosophy, and Politics. OCLC 862671624.
- Kozloff, Arielle P. (1982). "Weserkaf, Boy King of Dynasty V". The Bulletin of the Cleveland Museum of Art. 69 (7): 211–223. JSTOR 25159780.
