= Alessandro Barsanti =

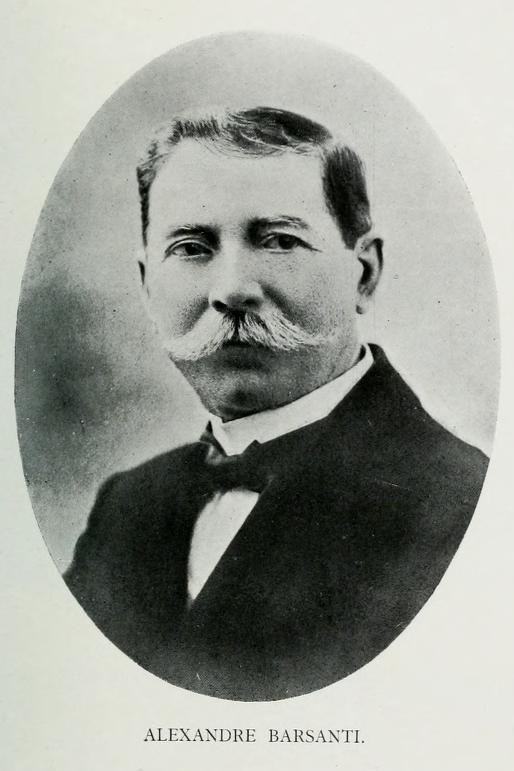
- Portrait of Alessandro Barsanti
- Born: 1858; Alexandria, Egypt
- Died: 1917 (aged 58–59); Cairo, Egypt
- Occupations: Architect; Egyptologist
- Known for: Discovery of the Royal Tomb of Akhenaten
- Scientific career
- Fields: Egyptology

Alessandro Barsanti (1858–1917) was an Italian architect and Egyptologist who worked for the Egyptian Antiquities Service. He excavated throughout Egypt (most notably he discovered the tomb of Akhenaten in 1891–1892). He was also in charge of the transfer of collection of the Cairo Museum from its site at Giza to the current location in Cairo itself.

== Writings ==
- Fouilles autour de la pyramide d'Ounas (1899–1890). In: Annales du service des antiquités de l'Égypte - Suppléments (ASAE), 1st issue, 1900. Institut Français d'Archéologie Orientale, Cairo. pp 149–190 & 230–285.
- Rapport sur la fouille de Dahchour (1902). In: Annales du service des antiquités de l'Égypte - Suppléments (ASAE), 3rd issue, 1902. Institut Français d'Archéologie Orientale, Cairo. pp 198–202.
- Fouilles de Zaouiét el-Aryán (1904–1905). In: Annales du service des antiquités de l'Égypte - Suppléments (ASAE), 7th issue, 1906. Institut Français d'Archéologie Orientale, Cairo. pp 257–287.
- Fouilles de Zaouiét el-Aryán (1911–1912). In: Annales du service des antiquités de l'Égypte - Suppléments (ASAE), 12th issue, 1912. Institut Français d'Archéologie Orientale, Cairo. pp 57–63.
