= Émile Chassinat =

French Egyptologist (1868–1948)

Émile Gaston Chassinat
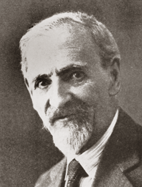
- Born: 5 May 1868; Paris
- Died: 26 May 1948 (aged 80); Saint-Germain-en-Laye

Émile Gaston Chassinat (5 May 1868 - 26 May 1948) was a French Egyptologist, and the Director of the French Institute for Oriental Archaeology in Cairo where he worked from around 1898 to around to 1912. Chassinat acquired two of the Amarna tablets in 1903 while working in Cairo, Egypt.

== Publications ==
- With H. Gauthier et H. Pieron, Fouilles de Qattah, MIFAO, Le Caire, 1906.
- Catalogue des signes hiéroglyphiques de l'imprimerie de l'Institut français du Caire, IFAO, Le Caire, 1907-1912-1915-1930.
- With C. Palanque, Une campagne de fouilles dans la nécropole d'Assiout, n°24, MIFAO, Le Caire, 1911.
- Supplément au catalogue des signes hiéroglyphiques de l'imprimerie de l'Institut français du Caire, IFAO, Le Caire, 1912.
- Le papyrus médical copte, n°32, MIFAO, Le Caire, 1921.
- Le temple d'Edfou, , fasc. 2, Mémoire, IFAO, Le Caire, 1960.
- With F. Daumas, Le temple de Dendara, IFAO, Le Caire, 1965.
- With F. Daumas, Le temple de Dendara, 2 fasc., IFAO, Le Caire, 1972.
- With F. Daumas, Le temple de Dendara, 2 fasc., IFAO, Le Caire, 1978.
- With M. de Rochemonteix, Le temple d'Edfou, fasc. 1, mémoires publiés par les membres de la mission archéologique française du Caire, IFAO, Le Caire, 1984.
- With M. de Rochemonteix, Le temple d'Edfou, fasc. 2, mémoires publiés par les membres de la mission archéologique française du Caire, IFAO, Le Caire, 1984.
- With M. de Rochemonteix, Le temple d'Edfou, fasc. 3, mémoires publiés par les membres de la mission archéologique française du Caire, IFAO, Le Caire, 1987.
- With M. de Rochemonteix, Le temple d'Edfou, fasc. 4, mémoires publiés par les membres de la mission archéologique française du Caire, IFAO, Le Caire, 1987.
- Le Temple de Dendara, 2 fasc., PIFAO, IFAO, Le Caire, 1987.
- Le temple d'Edfou, fasc. 1, MIFAO, Le Caire, 1987.
- Le temple d'Edfou, fasc. 2, Mémoire, IFAO, Le Cair
