= Pyramid of Djedefre =

Smooth-sided pyramid

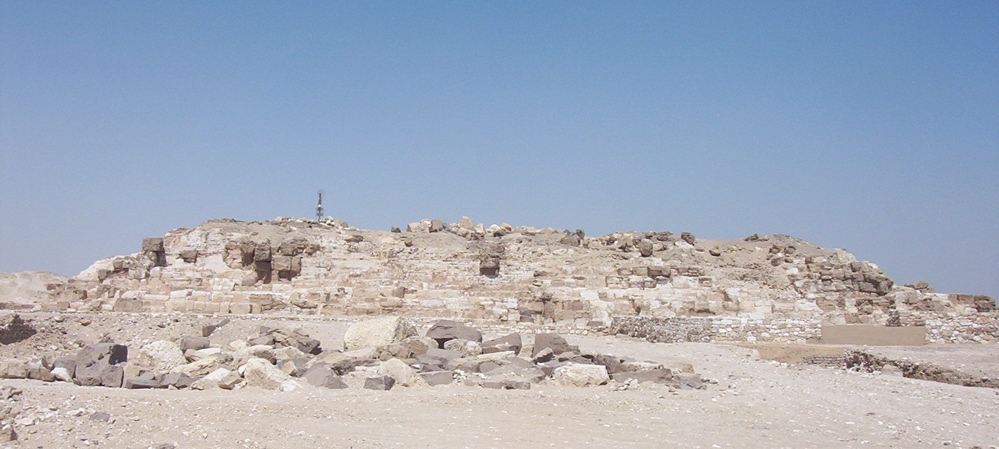
- Ruined stub of Djedefre's pyramid

- Location within Egypt
- 30°01′56″N 31°04′29″E
- Owner: Djedefre
Ancient name
< N5 R11 I9 > S29 V28 D46 F18 N14 G43 O24
Sḥdu Ḏd-f-Rˀ
Sehedu Djed-ef-re
"Djedefre's starry sky"
"Djedefre is a sehed-star"
- Constructed: Fourth Dynasty
- Type: True (original); Ruined (present)
- Height: 67 m (220 ft; 128 cu) (original); 11.4 m (37 ft; 21.8 cu) (present)
- Base: 106 m (348 ft; 202 cu)
- Volume: 131,043 m^{3} (171,398 cu yd)
- Slope: 51° to 52°

The pyramid of Djedefre is Egypt's northernmost pyramid. Believed to have been built by Djedefre, son and successor to king Khufu, it consists today mostly of ruins located at Abu Rawash in Egypt. An excavation report on the pyramid complex was published in 2011.

== Theories ==
Though some Egyptologists in the last few decades have suggested otherwise, recent excavations at Abu Rawash carried out by Dr. Michel Baud of the Louvre Museum in Paris suggest the pyramid was in fact more than half finished. If completed, however, it is suggested to have been about the same size as the pyramid of Menkaure – the third largest of the Giza pyramids. The exterior is thought to have been clad with limestone and polished granite. The destruction started at the end of the New Kingdom at the latest, and was particularly intense during the Roman and early Christian eras. It has been proven, moreover, that at the end of the nineteenth century, stone was still being hauled away at the rate of three hundred camel loads a day. The 20th century has also not been kind to this monument – during the last century, it was used as a military camp and its proximity to Cairo exposed it to modern development.

== Description ==
Djedefre's pyramid was architecturally different from those of his immediate predecessors in that the chambers were beneath the pyramid instead of inside. The pyramid was built over a natural mound and the chambers were created using the "pit and ramp" method, previously used on some mastaba tombs. Djedefre dug a pit 21 m × 9 m and 20 m deep in the natural mound. A ramp was constructed at an angle of 22°35′, and the chambers and access passage were built within the pit and along the ramp. Once the inner chambers were completed, the pit and ramp were filled in, and the pyramid was erected above them. This approach allowed the chambers to be constructed without tunneling and avoided the structural challenges associated with building them within the body of the pyramid itself. The builder also returned to an earlier architectural tradition by constructing a rectangular enclosure wall oriented north–south, similar to those of Djoser and Sekhemkhet.

Several pyramids and sun temples were built over natural mounds; utilising these may have been a way of shortening the actual work required, although the mound may have been symbolic of the primaeval mound of Egyptian creation myths.

== See also ==
- Egyptian pyramid construction techniques
- List of Egyptian pyramids
- List of megalithic sites

== Sources ==
- Bárta, Miroslav (2005). "Location of the Old Kingdom Pyramids in Egypt". Cambridge Archaeological Journal. 15 (2): 177–191. doi:10.1017/s0959774305000090. S2CID 161629772.
- Budge, Ernest Alfred Wallis (1920). An Egyptian Hieroglyphic Dictionary: With an index of English words, King List and Geographical List with Indexes, List of Hieroglyphic Characters, Coptic and Semitic Alphabets, etc. Vol. 2. London: J. Murray. OCLC 697736910.
- Edwards, Iorwerth (1975). The pyramids of Egypt. Harmondsworth: Penguin Books. ISBN 978-0-14-020168-0.
- Lehner, Mark (2008). The Complete Pyramids. New York: Thames & Hudson. ISBN 978-0-500-28547-3.
- Verner, Miroslav (2001d). The Pyramids: The Mystery, Culture and Science of Egypt's Great Monuments. New York: Grove Press. ISBN 978-0-8021-1703-8.
