= Zawyet El Aryan =

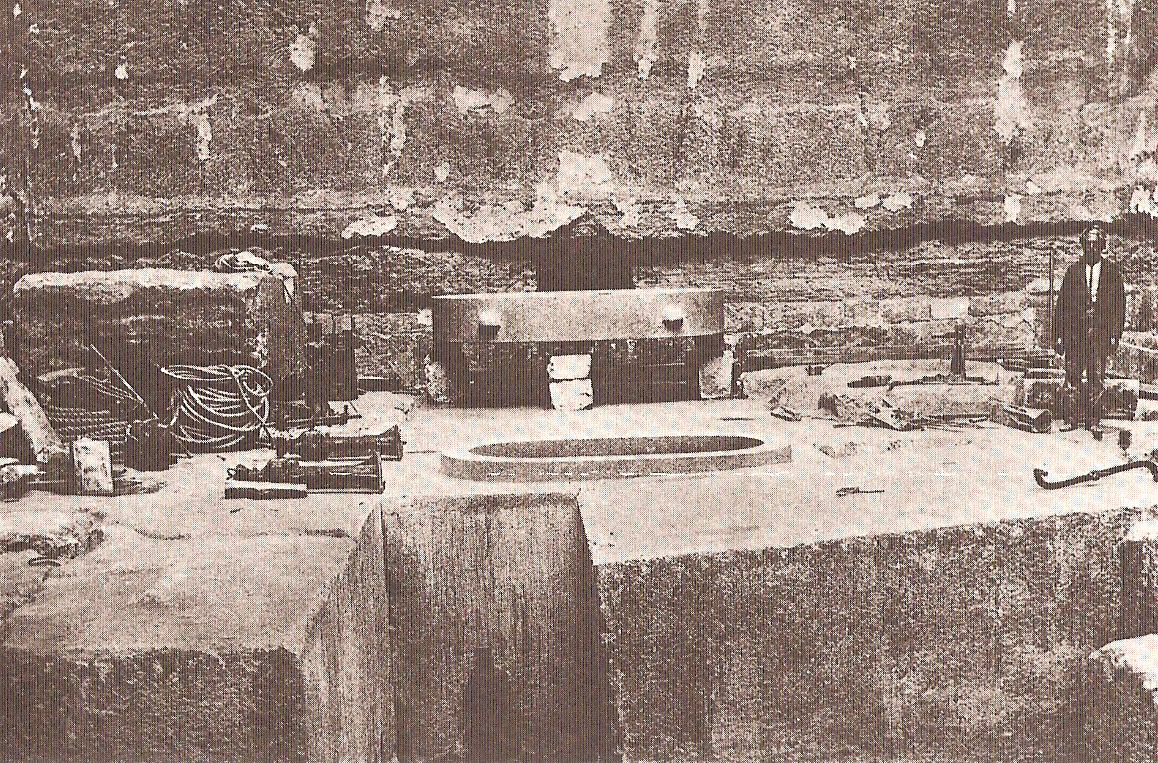

- Location in Egypt
- Coordinates: 29°54′N 31°12′E
- Country: Egypt
- Governorate: Giza
- Time zone: UTC+2 (EET)
  - Summer (DST): UTC+3 (EEST)

Zawyet El Aryan (زاویة العریان) is a town in the Giza Governorate of Egypt, located between Giza and Abusir. To the west of the town, just in the desert area, is a necropolis, referred to by the same name. Almost directly east across the Nile is Memphis. In Zawyet El Aryan, there are two pyramid complexes and five mastaba cemeteries.

== Pyramids ==
=== Layer Pyramid ===
The Layer Pyramid was built in the Third Dynasty, probably during the reign of Khaba. The pyramid was meant to be a step pyramid of possibly five to seven steps. No casing stones have been found, suggesting that the pyramid was never finished. The layout of the underground chambers resembles that of the Buried Pyramid. A corridor leading into the interior has thirty-two side chambers meant for storage of the burial equipment.

=== Unfinished Pyramid ===
This unfinished pyramid belongs to a king with an illegible name and comprises little more than a massive descendry. All that stands now is a square base on which the core of the pyramid would have been constructed. A pink granite sarcophagus was found in a trench which cuts through the structure, although it may date to a later time period. The existence of underground chambers has been suspected, but excavations have not been possible as the structure is now part of a military restricted zone. Also called the "Northern Pyramid", this structure dates to the Fourth Dynasty.

== Necropolis ==
The area of Zawyet El Aryan is surrounded by a total of five cemeteries dating to the 1st Dynasty, 2nd Dynasty, late 3rd Dynasty, 18th Dynasty and Roman Period. Of these cemeteries, only the one dating to the late 3rd Dynasty contains large tombs, of which are four mudbrick mastabas. Reisner and Fisher observed that this is to be expected of the necropolis surrounding the pyramid of a pharaoh, the large tombs being those of the royal family and court officials. In particular, around 200 metres (660 ft) north of the Layer Pyramid is a huge mastaba, today known as "Mastaba Z500", which yielded eight marble bowls inscribed with the serekh of king Khaba. Reisner and Fisher therefore conclude that "if the mastabas belong to people connected with the king who built the pyramid, it is probable that the king’s name was Khaba". This opinion is shared by most Egyptologists who attribute the Layer Pyramid to Khaba.

== Zawyet El Aryan today ==
Since 1960, much of the area near Zawyet El Aryan has been restricted for use as a military base. Access to the pyramids has been restricted since 1964. No excavations are allowed, the original necropolis is overbuilt with military bungalows, and the shaft of the Unfinished Pyramid has allegedly been misused as a trash dump. The condition of both burial shafts is uncertain and most possibly disastrous.
