= Abu Rawash =

Village in Giza Governorate, Egypt

Coordinates: 30°01′55″N 31°04′30″E

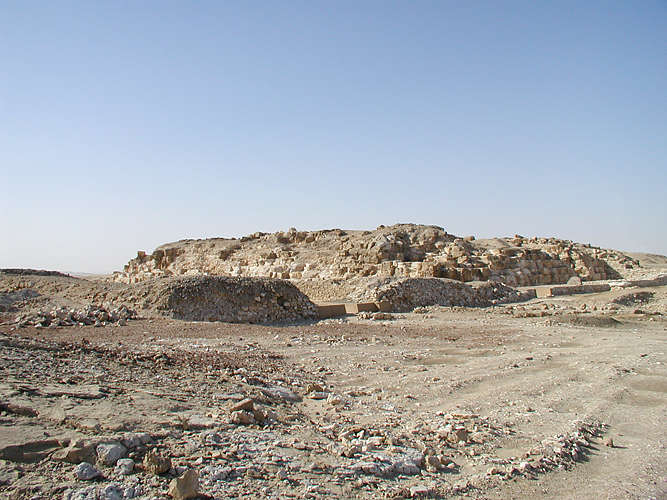
The ruined Pyramid of Djedefre sits atop the plateau of Abu Rawash

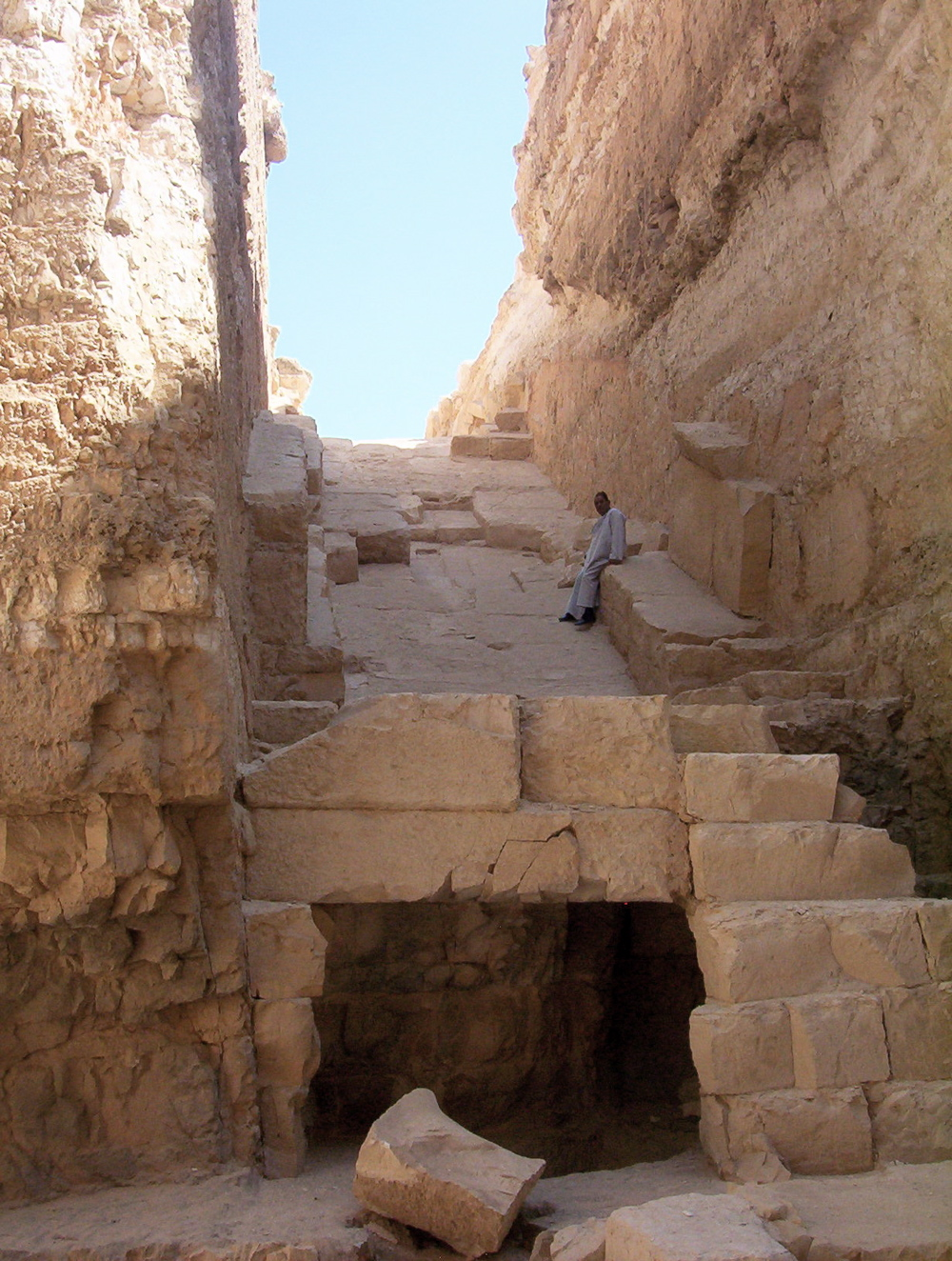
The guard at Abu Rawash rests in the shade of the burial pit of the Pyramid of Djedefre

Abu Rawash (also spelled Abu Roach, Abu Roash; Arabic: ابو رواش Egyptian Arabic pronunciation: [ˈæbu ɾæˈwæːʃ], Coptic: ⲁⲃⲣⲱⲟⲩϣⲓ abrowshi, Coptic pronunciation: [ɑbˈroːwʃi], "flesh of sensual pleasures"), 8 kilometres (5.0 mi) north of Giza, is the site of Egypt's most northerly pyramid, also known as the lost pyramid – the mostly ruined Pyramid of Djedefre, the son and successor of Khufu. Originally, it was thought that this pyramid had never been completed, but the current archaeological consensus is that not only was it completed, but that it was built about the same size as the Pyramid of Menkaure – the third largest of the Giza pyramids. It's believed that the destruction of the pyramid started at the end of the New Kingdom at the latest, and was particularly intense during the Roman and early Christian eras when a Coptic monastery was built in nearby Wadi Karin. It has been proven, moreover, that at the end of the nineteenth century, stone was still being hauled away at the rate of three hundred camel loads a day.

It is the location of the northernmost pyramid in Egypt (known as Lepsius Number One), the pyramid of Djedefre (also known as Radjedef) and around fifty mastabas (located one and a half kilometres from Djedefre’s pyramid). The excavation report on the pyramid complex was published in 2011.

== Location ==
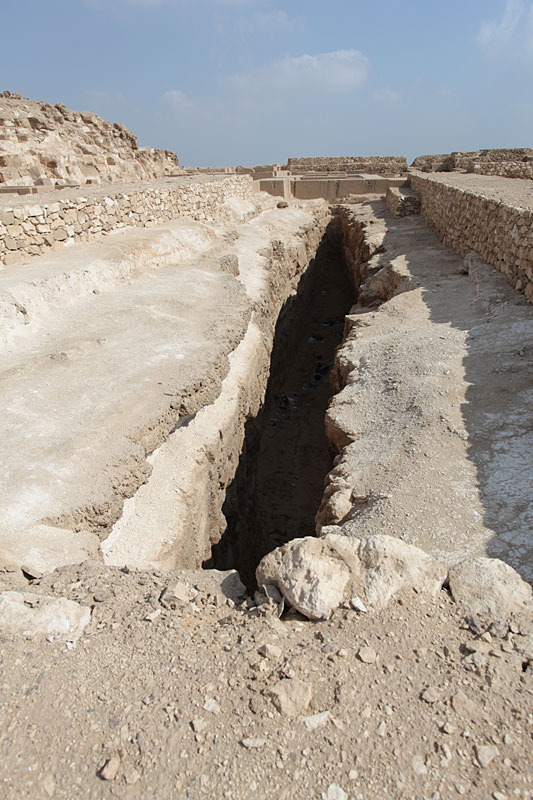
Abu Rawash Pyramid Boat Pit

Its location adjacent to a major crossroads made it an easy source of stone. Quarrying, which began in Roman times, has left little apart from a few courses of stone superimposed upon the natural hillock that formed part of the pyramid's core.

== Geology of Abu Rawash ==
The sedimentary succession in Abu Rawash area ranges in age from Late Cretaceous to Quaternary but is punctuated by several unconformity surfaces. Turonian to Coniacian representing the sedimentary succession of Abu Rawash formation that differentiated into six informal units (members) from younger to older as follows:

- Basal clastic member
- Rudist-bearing limestone-marl member
- Limestone member
- Actaeonella-bearing limestone-marl member
- Flint-bearing chalky limestone member
- Plicatula-bearing marl-limestone member.

== Mastabas ==
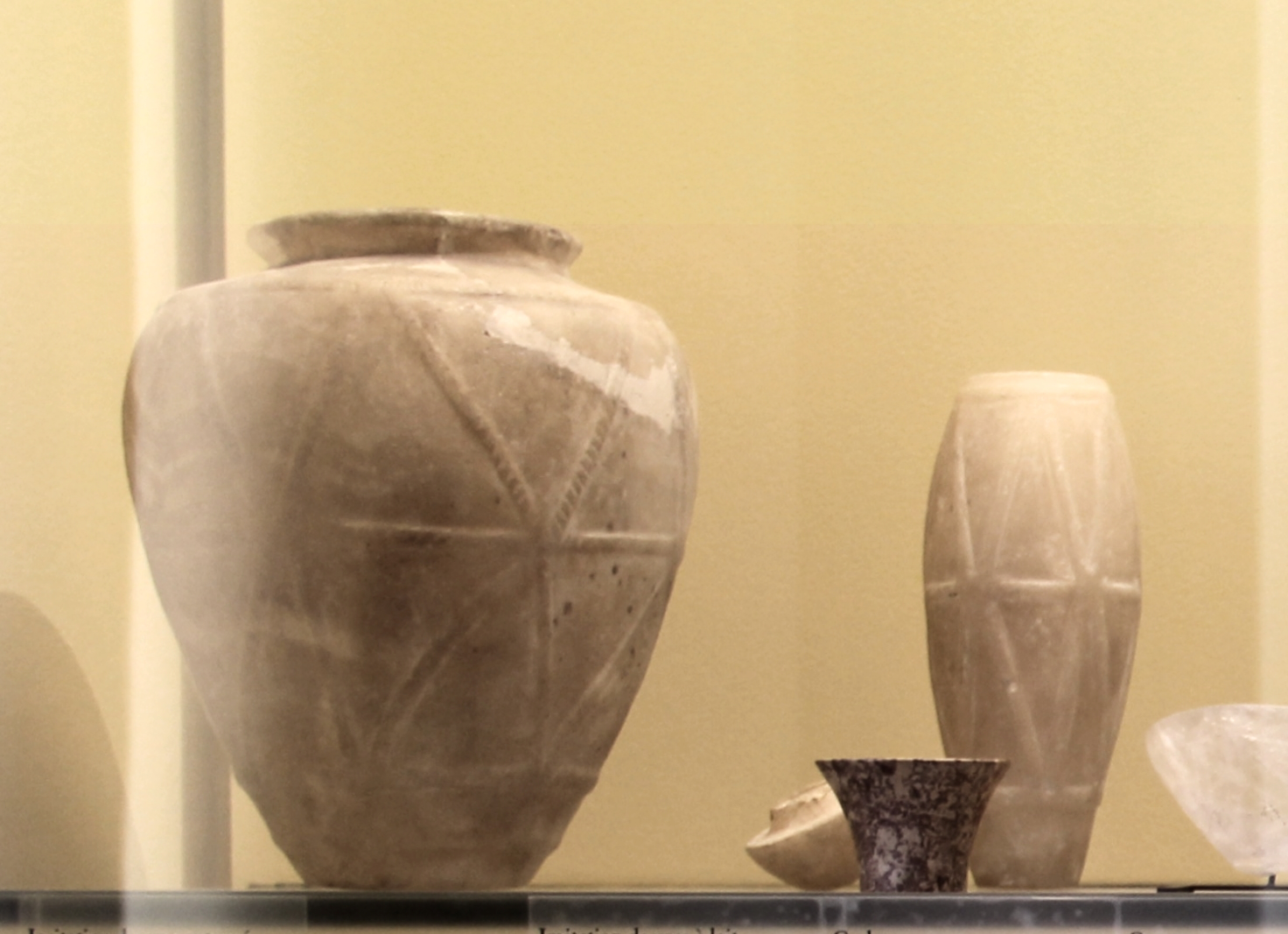
Alabaster vessels from a First Dynasty cemetery, Abu Rawash. Louvre Museum AF 9149, AF 9148

The first burials in the area date to the First Dynasty. There is a large Thinite necropolis at the site and a number of objects bearing the names of Hor-Aha and Den were found in the area. A set of radiocarbon data for the reign of Den from the site sets his accession to 3011–2921 BC (1σ).

Unlike the fourth dynasty mastabas of Giza which sit very close to the pyramids and seem to have been built to a plan in advance, the fourth dynasty necropolis at Abu Rawash (cemetery F) lies some distance from Djedefre’s pyramid and the mastabas seem to have been built to order and laid out in a more haphazard manner. There are also a number of burials dating to the fifth and sixth dynasties and a smaller number dating to the Middle Kingdom.

Most of the mastabas are composed of external walls made up of large blocks layered around a bedrock core with the upper sections filled in with loose masonry. On the east side there is a cult niche to the north and a L-shaped chapel to the south. Some of the southern chapels have brick annexes to extend them. Many of the tombs are anonymous but some bear the names of their owners and some artifacts have been recovered also bearing these names; for example an alabaster offering table dedicated to Hornit.

== See also ==
- List of ancient Egyptian towns and cities
- List of ancient Egyptian sites
- List of megalithic sites
