= Lepsius list of pyramids =

1842 list by Karl Richard Lepsius

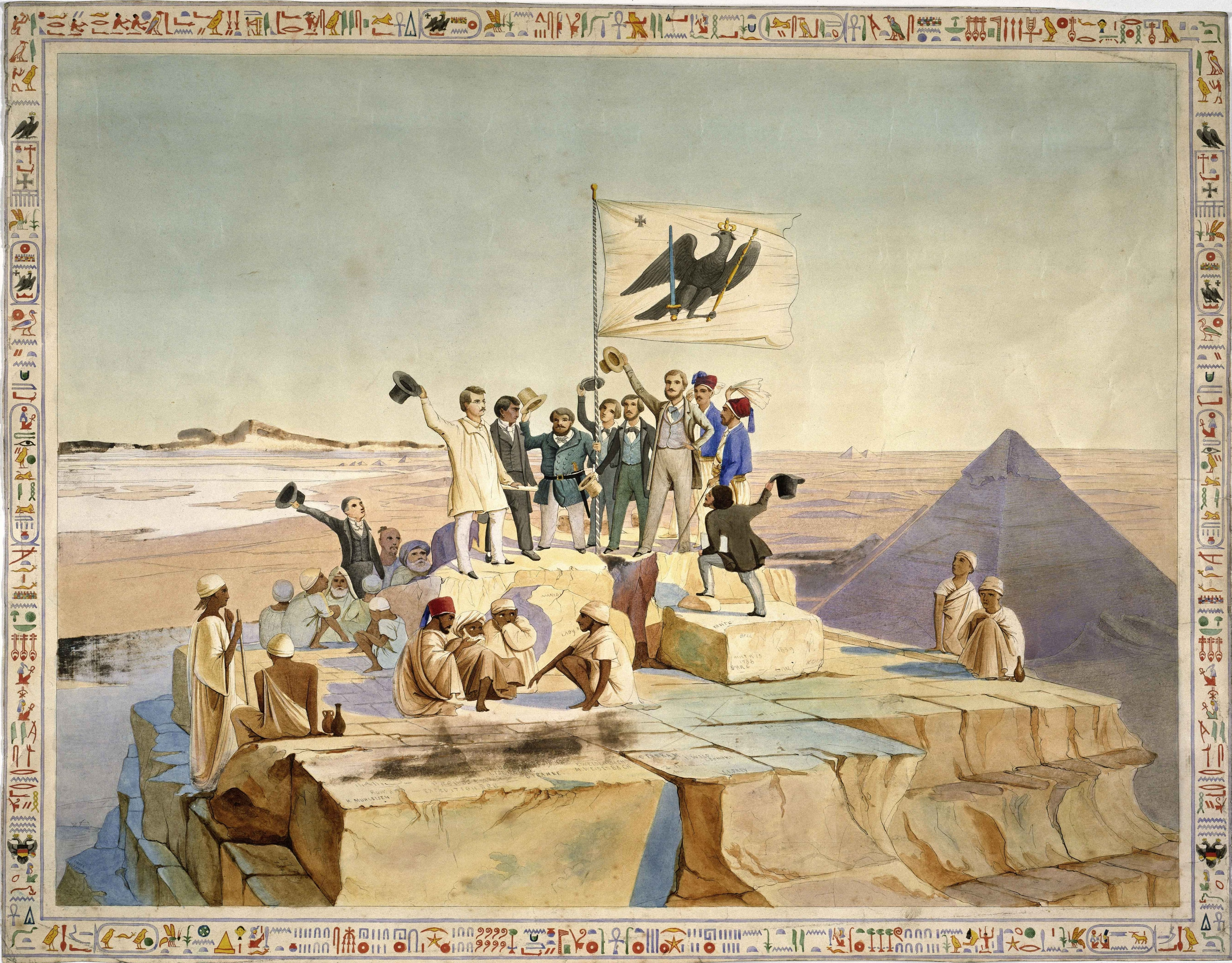
Members of the Prussian expedition to Egypt celebrate Frederick William IV's birthday on the summit of the Great Pyramid of Giza

The Lepsius list of pyramids is a list of sixty-seven ancient Egyptian pyramids established in 1842–1843 by Karl Richard Lepsius (1810–1884), an Egyptologist and leader of the "Prussian expedition to Egypt" from 1842 until 1846.

The Lepsius list of pyramid is the first attempt at systematically listing all the Egyptian pyramids, and as such, is a pioneering effort of early modern Egyptology. The list was published together with the results of the expedition in Lepsius work Denkmäler aus Aegypten und Aethiopien (1849–1859).

== List ==
=== History ===
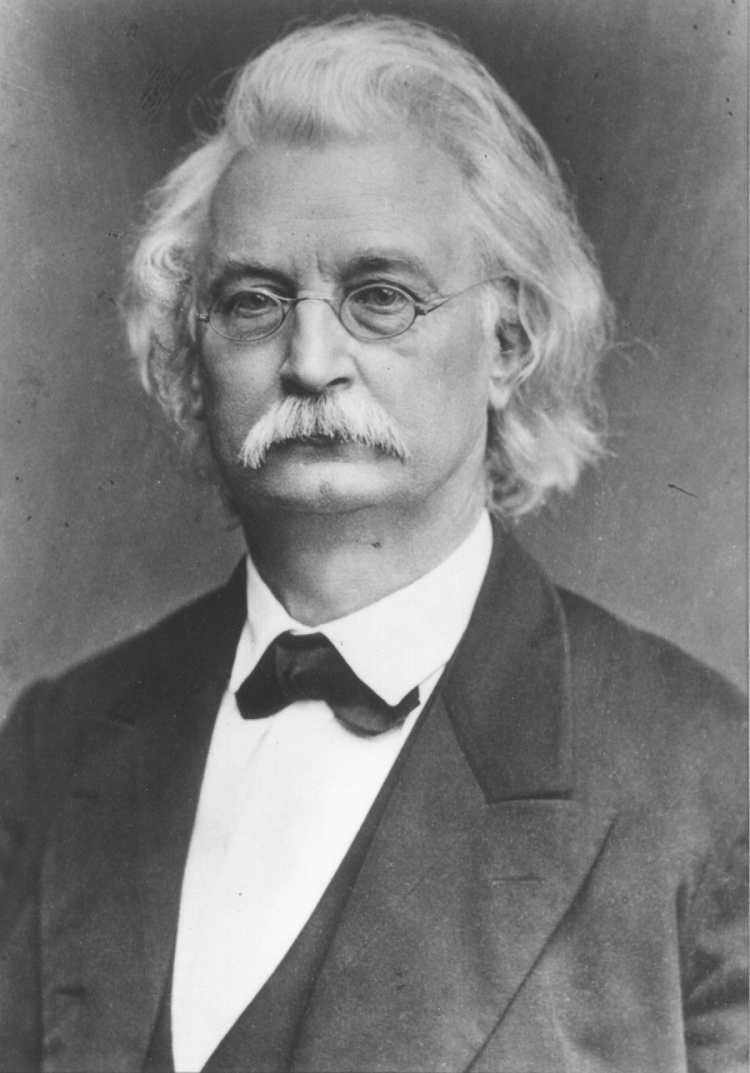
Karl Richard Lepsius

Following the success of the Franco-Tuscan Expedition to Egypt under the leadership of Jean-François Champollion, the Prussian scientists Alexander von Humboldt and Robert Wilhelm Bunsen and the minister of instruction Johann Eichhorn recommended to king Frederick William IV that an expedition be sent to Egypt. Karl Richard Lepsius, who had learned of Champollion's method to decipher the hieroglyphs and had met Ippolito Rosellini of the Franco-Tuscan Expedition, was chosen to lead it. The main aim of the expedition was to explore and record the remains of the ancient Egyptian civilization as well as to gather materials for the Egyptian Museum of Berlin.

The Prussian expedition assembled in Alexandria in 1842 and quickly departed for Giza, which was reached in November that same year. Proceeding north to south, Lepsius's men then explored the pyramids field of Abusir, Saqqara, Dahshur and, in 1843, Hawara. Lepsius and team stayed for 6 months in total at these locations, as the Prussian expedition was the first to study and record Old Kingdom material in depth.

In total, Lepsius and his men uncovered a total of 67 pyramids and 130 tombs. The pyramids, dating from the Third Dynasty (c. 2686–2613 BCE) until the Thirteenth Dynasty (c. 1800–1650 BCE), were given Roman numerals from north to south, starting from Abu Rawash in the north. Although a few of the structures reported by Lepsius are now known to have been mastabas and other monumental structures (highlighted on the list below in light gray), the Lepsius list of pyramids is still considered a pioneering achievement of modern Egyptology. Lepsius' numerals have remained the standard designation for some of the pyramids.

The results of the Prussian expedition to Egypt, comprising the list of pyramids, were published in the Denkmäler aus Aegypten und Aethiopien.

=== Pyramids ===
Lepsius Number	Location	Modern identification	Image
I	Abu Rawash	Pyramid Lepsius I	
II	Abu Rawash	Pyramid of Djedefre	
III	Abu Rawash	Pyramid complex of Djedefre, subsidiary pyramid	
IV	Giza	Great Pyramid of Giza	
V	Giza	North subsidiary pyramid of Khufu's, G1-a	
VI	Giza	Middle subsidiary pyramid of Khufu's, G1-b	
VII	Giza	South subsidiary pyramid of Khufu's, G1-c	
VIII	Giza	Pyramid of Khafre	
IX	Giza	Pyramid of Menkaure	
X	Giza	West subsidiary pyramid of Menkaure's, G3-c	
XI	Giza	Middle subsidiary pyramid of Menkaure's, G3-b	
XII	Giza	East subsidiary pyramid of Menkaure's, G3-a	
XIII	Zawyet el'Aryan	Unfinished Northern Pyramid of Zawyet el'Aryan	
XIV	Zawyet el'Aryan	Layer Pyramid	
XV	Abu Gorab	Sun temple of Nyuserre Ini	
XVI	Abusir	Unidentified brick pyramid	
XVII	Abusir	Sun temple of Userkaf	
XVIII	Abusir	Pyramid of Sahure	
XIX	Abusir	Mastaba of vizier Ptahshepses	
XX	Abusir	Pyramid of Nyuserre	
XXI	Abusir	Pyramid of Neferirkare	
XXII	Abusir	Small satellite pyramid	
XXIII	Abusir	Small satellite pyramid	
XXIV	Abusir	Pyramid Lepsius XXIV, queen of Nyuserre Ini	
XXV	Abusir	Double Pyramid, queen of Nyuserre Ini or Neferefre, could be a double mastaba	
XXVI	Abusir	Pyramid of Neferefre	
XXVII	Abusir	Completely destroyed, only an outline is visible	
XXVIII	Abusir	Unfinished pyramid or a natural structure	
XXIX	Saqqara	Headless Pyramid of Menkauhor Kaiu	
XXX	Saqqara	Pyramid of Teti	
XXXI	Saqqara	Pyramid of Userkaf	
XXXII	Saqqara	Pyramid of Djoser	
XXXIII	Saqqara	North pavillon of Djoser's pyramid complex	
XXXIV	Saqqara	South pavillon of Djoser's pyramid complex	
XXXV	Saqqara	Pyramid of Unas	
XXXVI	Saqqara	Pyramid of Pepi I	
XXXVII	Saqqara	Pyramid of Djedkare-Isesi	
XXXVIII	Saqqara	Subsidiary pyramid of Djedkare's for Setibhor	
XXXIX	Saqqara	Pyramid of Merenre	
XL	Saqqara	Pyramid of Ibi	
XLI	Saqqara	Pyramid of Pepi II	
XLII	Saqqara	Subsidiary pyramid of Pepi II's for his queen Wedjebten	
XLIII	Saqqara	Mastabat al-Fir'aun of Shepseskaf	
XLIV	Saqqara	Pyramid of Khendjer	
XLV	Saqqara	13th Dynasty structure	
XLVI	Saqqara	Southern South Saqqara pyramid	
XLVII	Dahshur	Pyramid of Senusret III	
XLVIII	Dahshur	Mastaba, unknown owner	
XLIX	Dahshur	Red Pyramid	
L	Dahshur	Lepsius-L Pyramid	
LI	Dahshur	Pyramid of Amenemhat II	
LII	Dahshur	Pylon of the temple of the pyramid of Amenemhat II	
LIII	Dahshur	Pylon of the temple of the pyramid of Amenemhat II	
LIV	Dahshur	Central Dahshur pyramid	
LV	Dahshur	Mastaba of vizier Siese	
LVI	Dahshur	Bent Pyramid	
LVII	Dahshur	Subsidiary pyramid of the bent pyramid	
LVIII	Dahshur	Pyramid of Amenemhat III	
LIX	Dahshur	Northern Mazghuna pyramid	
LX	El-Lisht	Pyramid of Amenemhat I	
LXI	El-Lisht	Pyramid of Senusret I	
LXII	El-Lisht	Mastaba, unknown owner	
LXIII	El-Lisht	Mastaba of Senewosret-Ankh	
LXIV	El-Lisht	Mastaba, possibly belonging to a private individual named Senusret	
LXV	Meidum	Pyramid of Meidum	
LXVI	El-Lahun	Pyramid of Senusret II	
LXVII	Hawara	Pyramid of Hawara, of Amenemhat III. Situated north of "The Labyrinth"	

== Lepsius' maps ==
Lepsius drew maps of the locations his expedition visited and which regroup the pyramid listed above. They are presented below, from north to south.

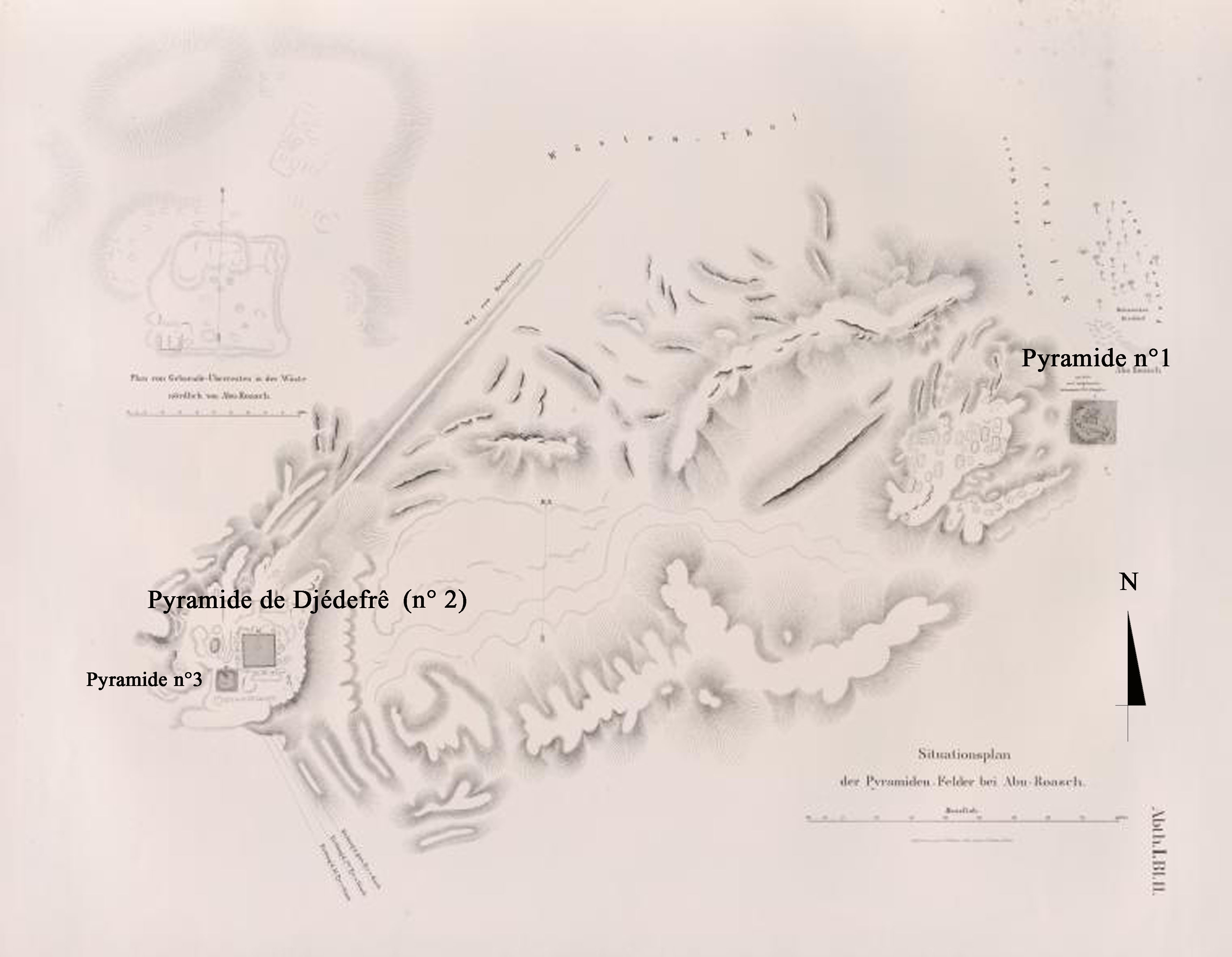
Abu Rawash

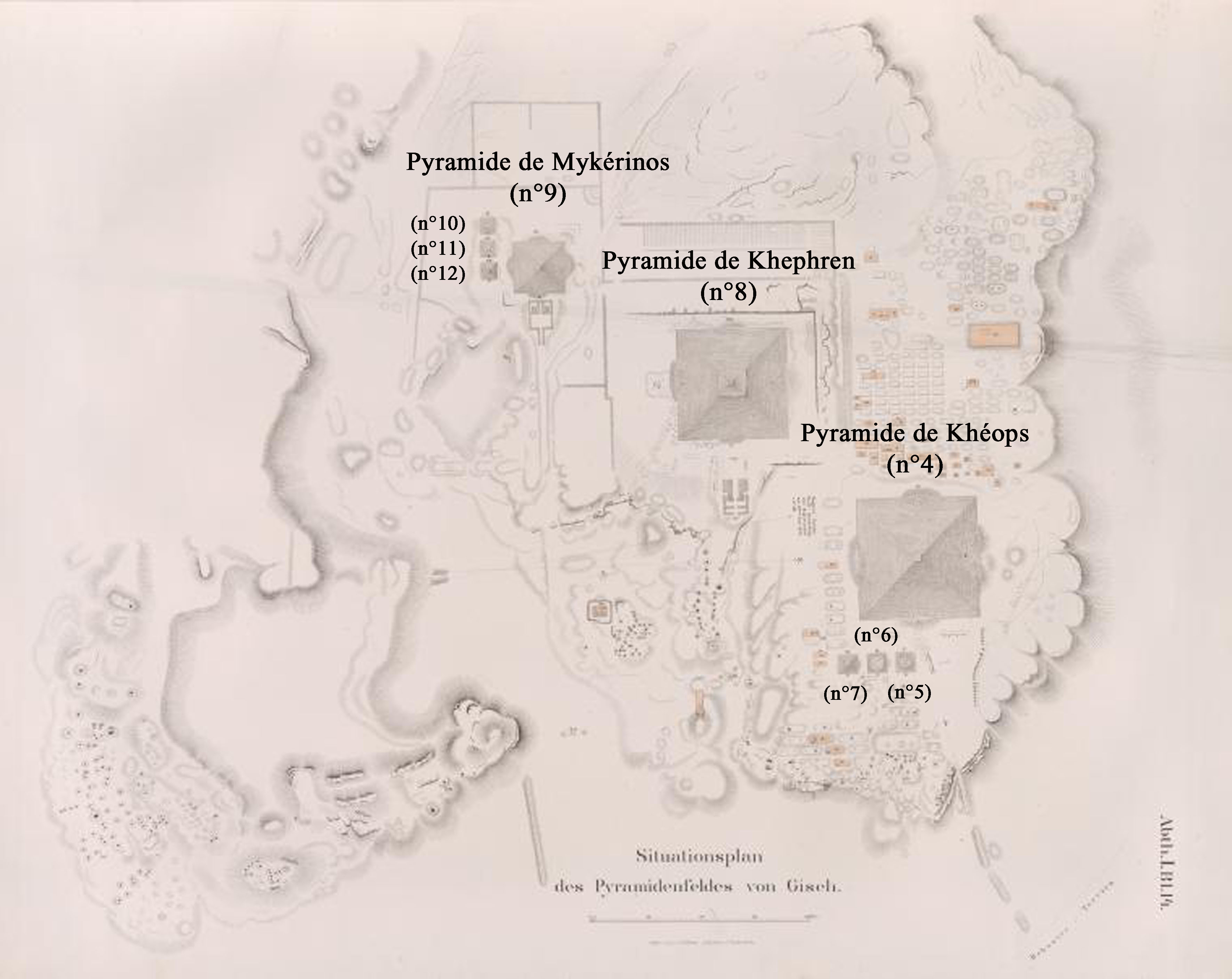
Giza

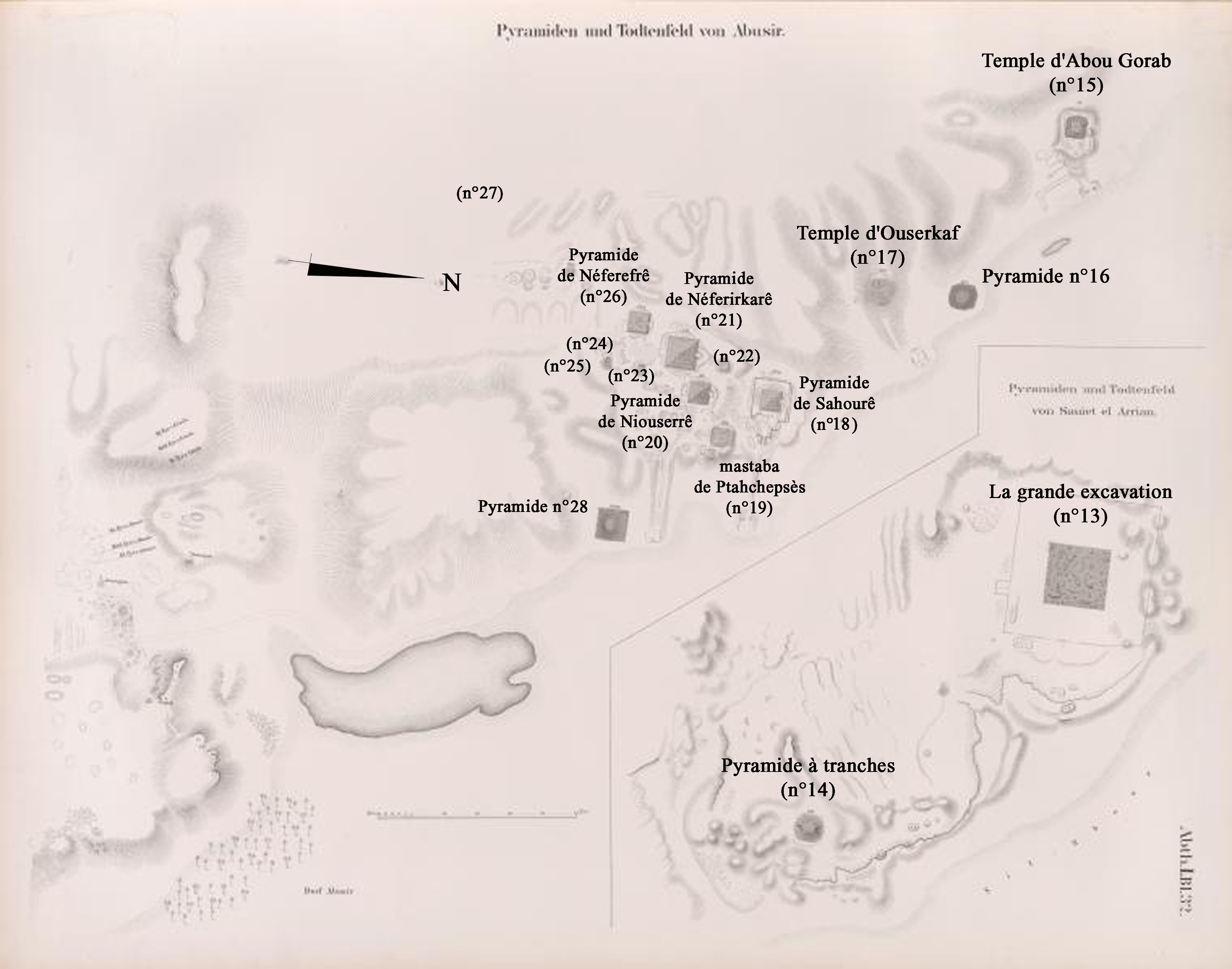
Zawyet el'Aryan and Abusir

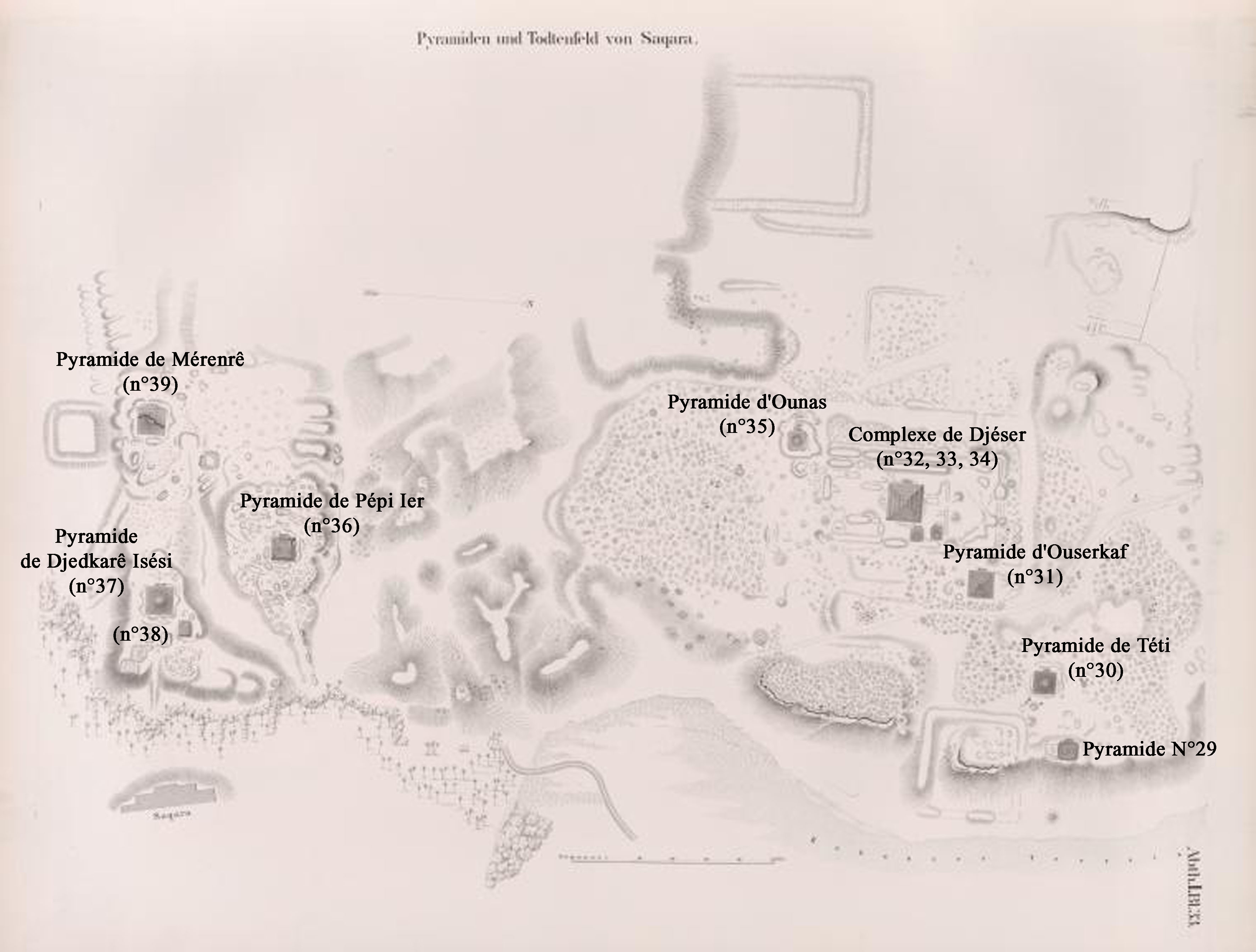
Saqqara

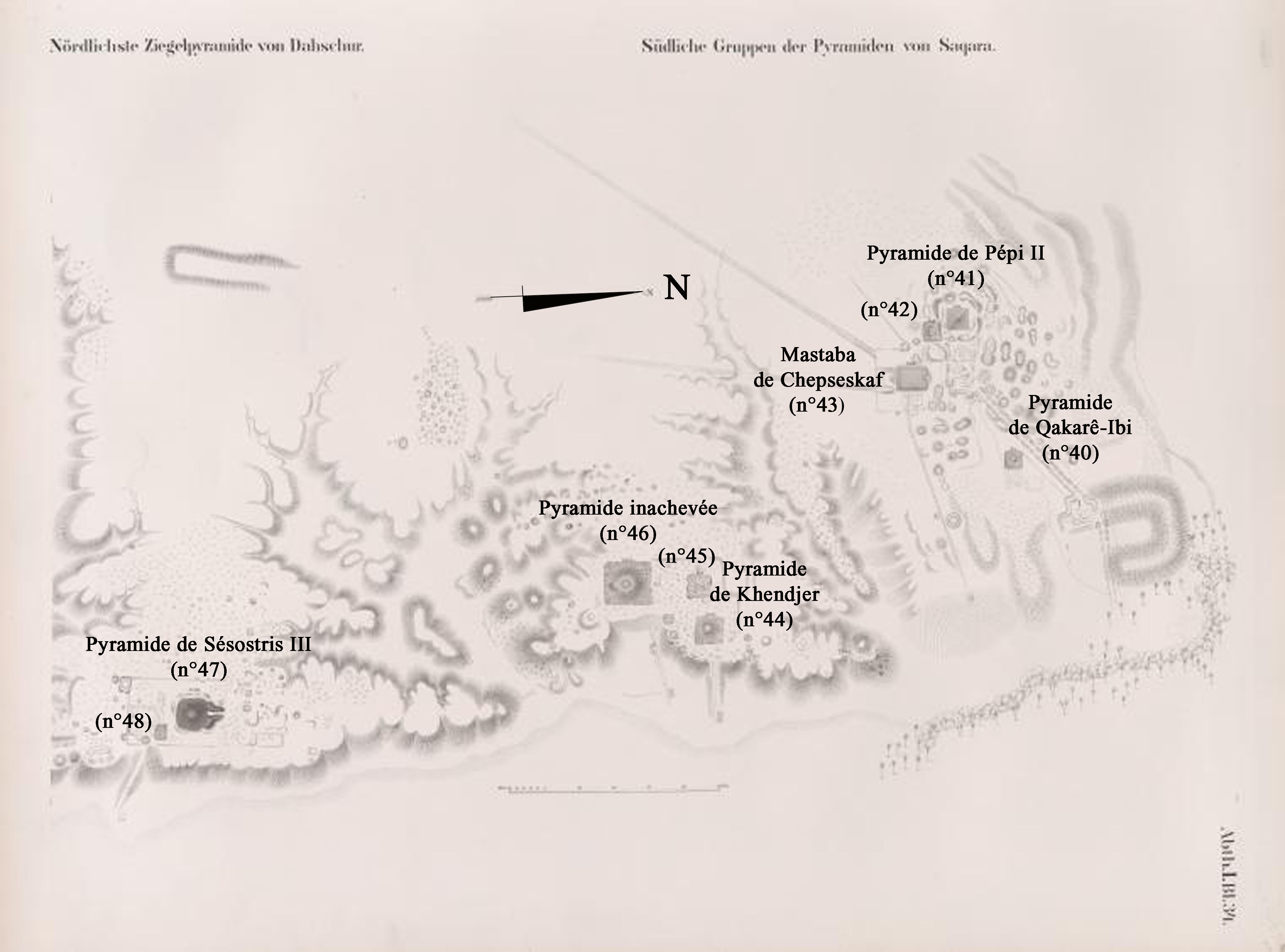
South Saqqara

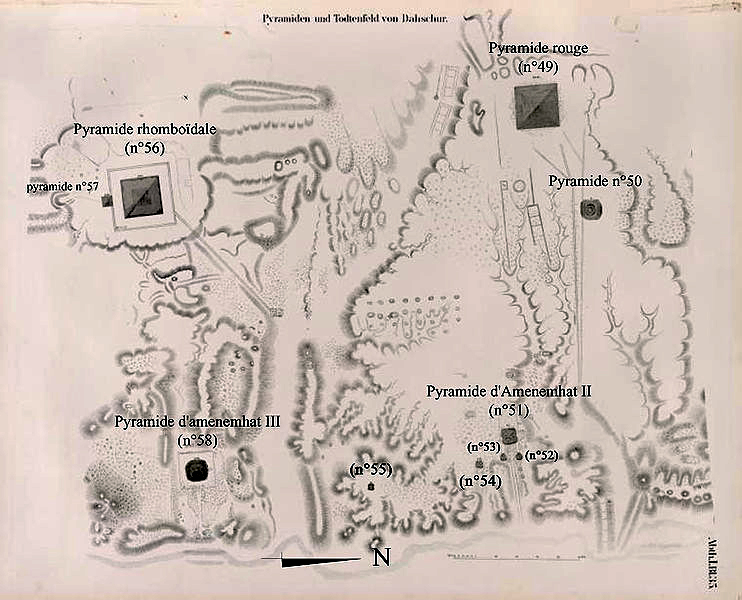
Dahshur

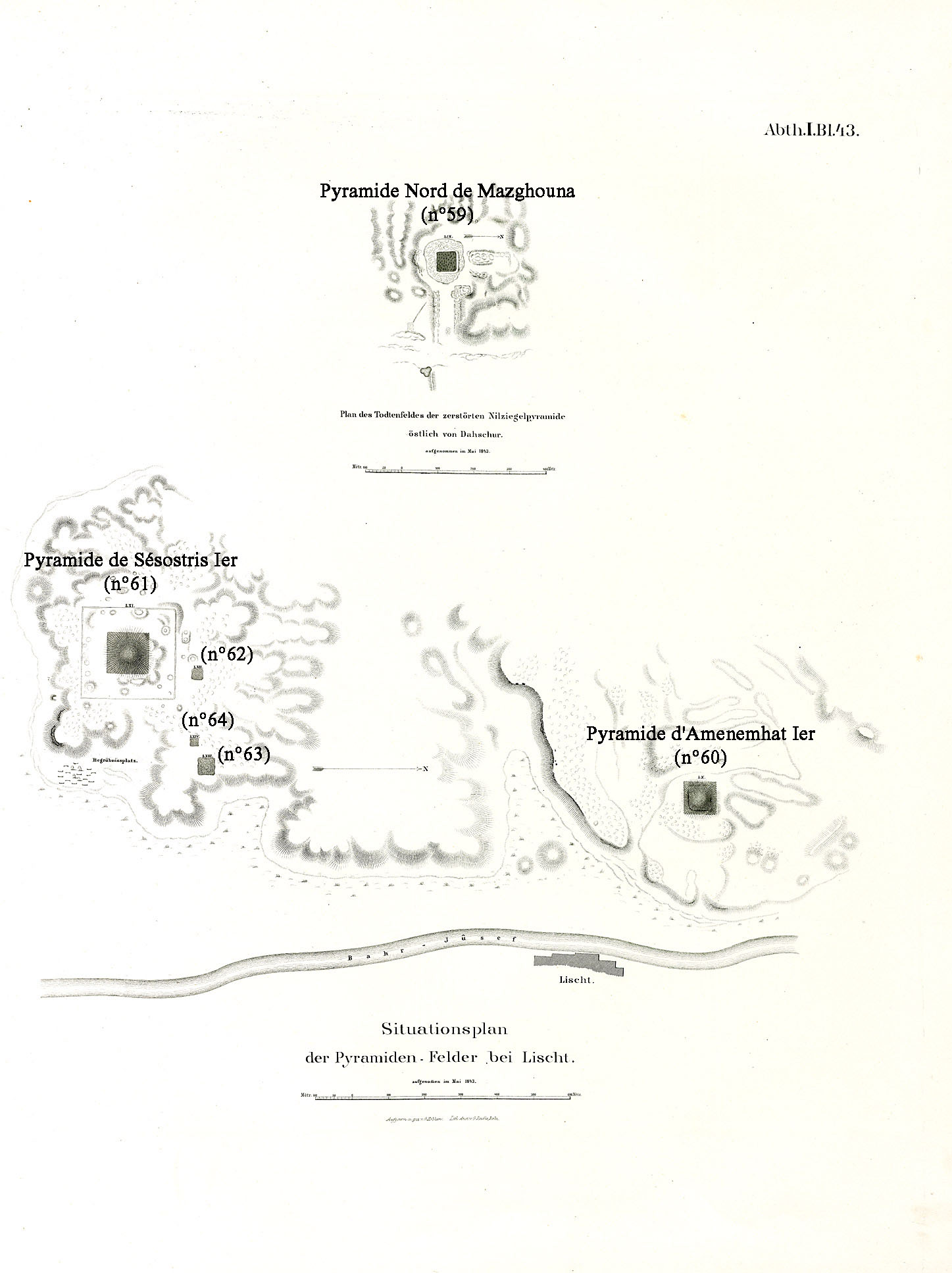
El-Lisht

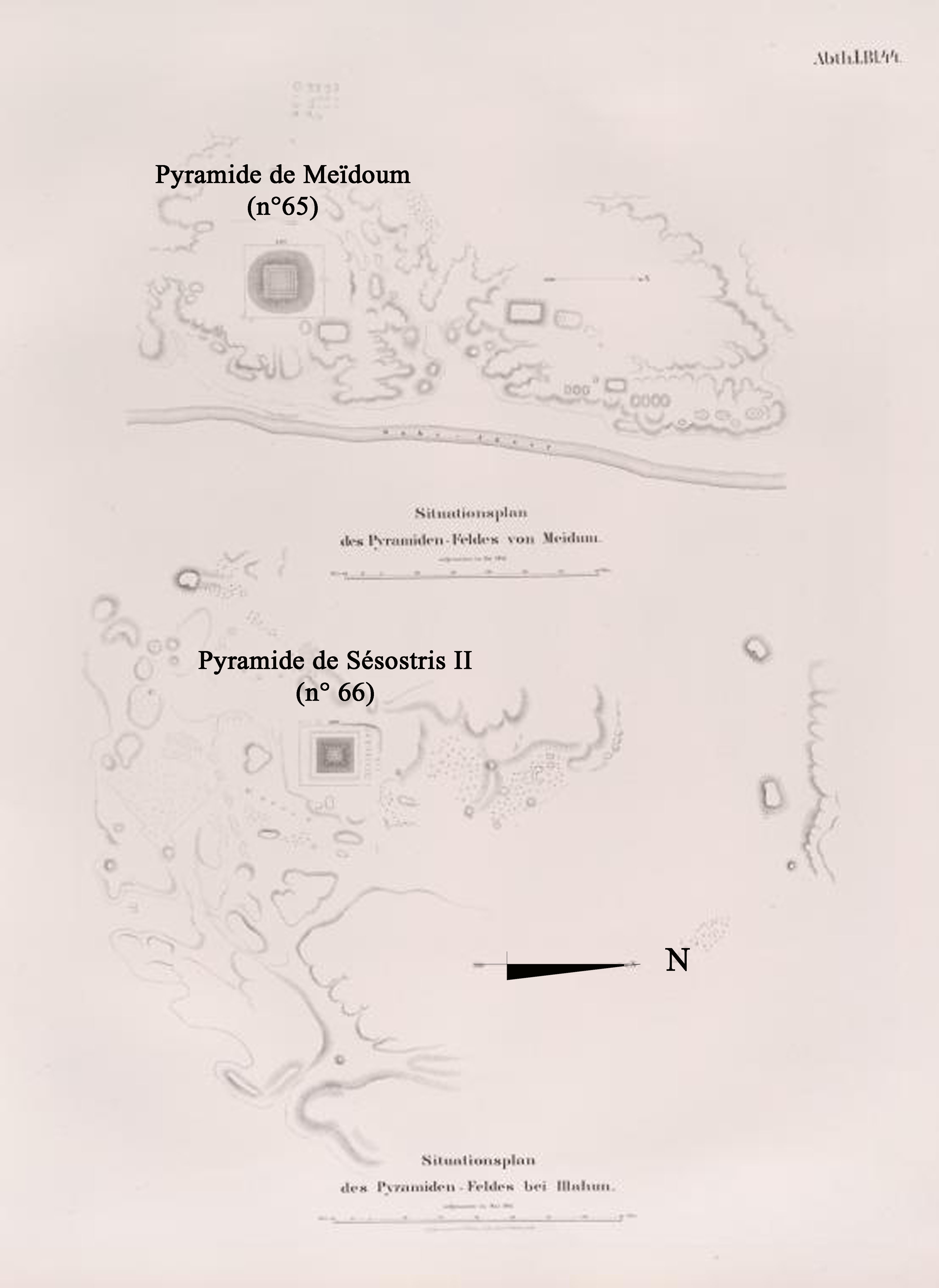
Meidum and El-Lahun

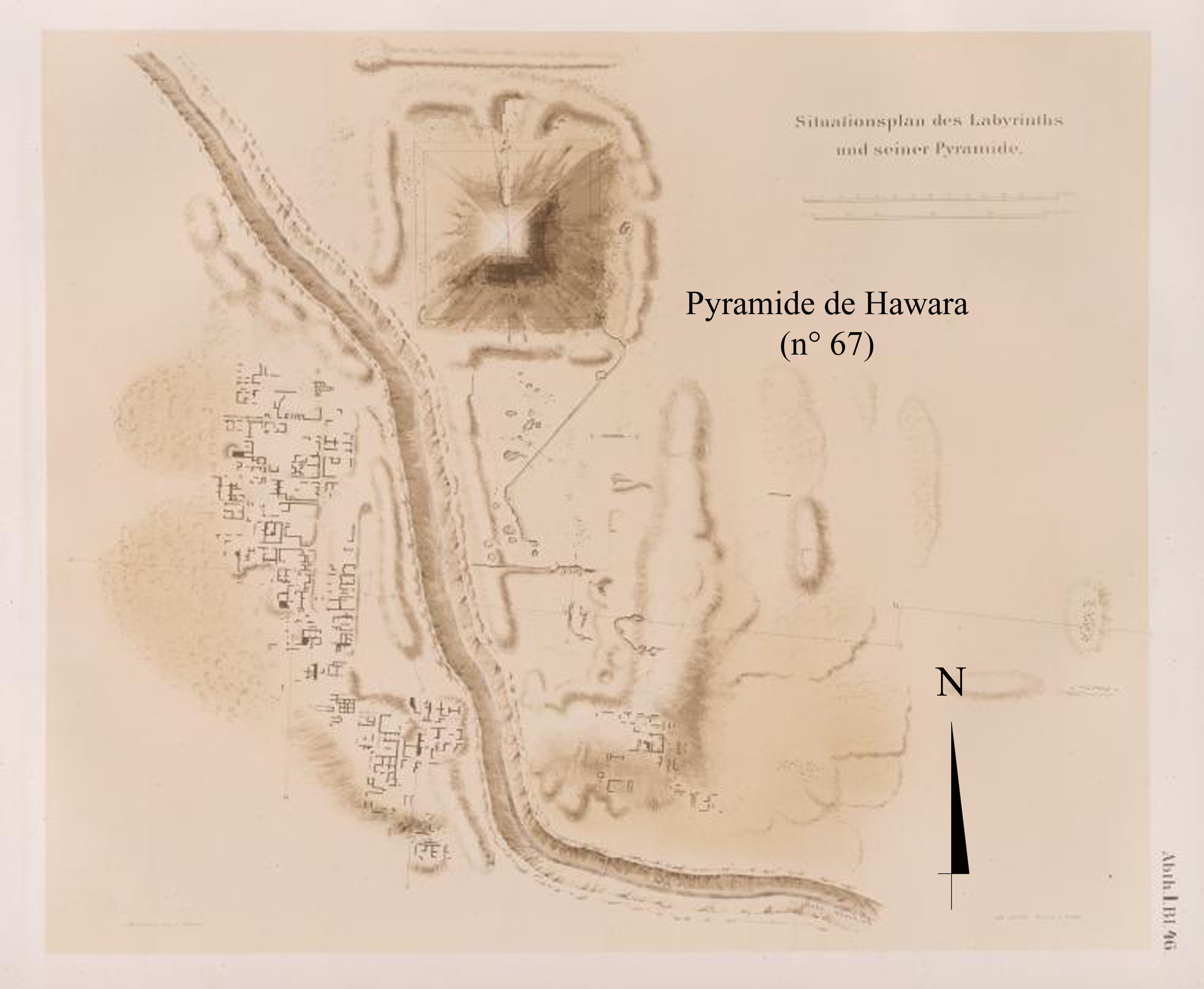
Hawara
