= Lepsius L =

Pyramid complex in Dahshur, Egypt

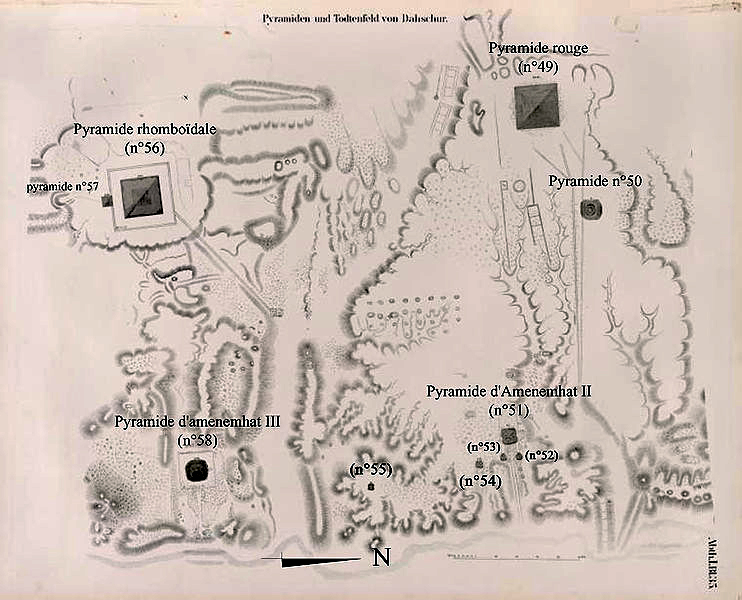

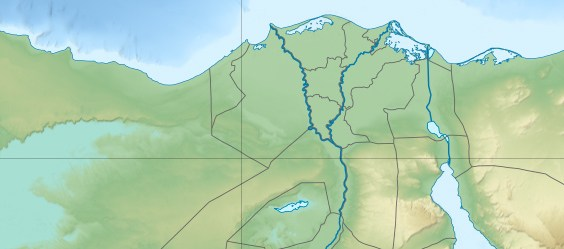
- Location within Lower Egypt
- 29°48′39″N 31°12′44″E
- Owner: Unknown, possibly Menkauhor
Ancient name
From a decree of Pepi I presumed to refer to the pyramid:
< G5 M17 D28 G43 > R8 Q1 Q1 Q1 O24
Nṯr-ỉswt Ỉkꜣw-Ḥr
Netjer-isut Ikauhor
'Divine are the places of Ikauhor'
- Constructed: Fourth or Fifth Dynasty (possibly)
- Type: True (now ruined)
- Material: Limestone
- Base: ~ 85 m (279 ft; 162 cu) ~ 40 m (130 ft; 76 cu)

The Lepsius L Pyramid is the remain of a pyramid complex built in Dahshur, approximately 250 m (820 ft) east of the Red Pyramid of pharaoh Sneferu of the Fourth Dynasty. The identity of the pyramid owner is unknown. The site was initially visited by Karl Richard Lepsius during his 1842–45 expedition to Egypt. He provided a brief description and catalogued it as 'Steinpyramide L' in his pyramid list. The site was then excavated by Rainer Stadelmann in 1986.

== Pyramid complex ==
Lepsius measured the base of the pyramid as being 85 m (279 ft; 162 cu) square; Stadelmann measured it as being 40 m (130 ft). Lepsius further identified a path leading towards the Red Pyramid which may have been the pyramid's causeway. He also noted the presence of a necropolis adjoining the pyramid's north side. Stadelmann discovered large limestone blocks that are presumed to have been intended for the pyramid's substructure, a mudbrick construction ramp, and the remains of Fourth Dynasty era pottery.

== Ownership ==
Ludwig Borchardt and Stadelmann have ascribed the pyramid to Menkauhor of the Fifth Dynasty of Egypt, though this identification is contested. They cite a royal decree issued by Pepi I of the Sixth Dynasty that was uncovered in the pyramid town of Sneferu's Red Pyramid and mentions Menkauhor's pyramid to support this assignment:

M17 G43 V24 G43 N35 U36 F35 D21 N35 W25 N35 X1 A1 A1 A1 V30 D21 M8 G1 D46 G43 A24 G17 D21 Z1 O1 N35 < G5 M17 D28 G43 > R8 Q1 Q1 Q1 O24
ỉw wḏ-n ḥnỉ nfr-n ỉnt rmt nb r šꜣdw m rꜣ-pr n nṯr-ỉswt Ỉkꜣw-Ḥr
My Majesty commands that no one shall be sent to dig in the temple of the pyramid 'Divine are the place of Ikauhor' (Note: There is a slight variation in the name of the pyramid in the decree from other sources. In Pepi I's decree nṯr is written as 𓊹, whereas it is written as 𓊹 𓂋 in the mastaba of Ptahhetep and Akhethetep and in the tomb of Min-anhk.)

Menkauhor is, however, also associated with the Headless Pyramid in Saqqara, another pyramid with contested ownership. This attribution is supported by Jean-Philippe Lauer and Jean Leclant because the displacement of the causeway of Teti's pyramid indicates that the Headless Pyramid was built earlier; Vito Maragioglio and Celeste Rinaldi because the manner of construction of the Headless Pyramid's substructure follows the Fifth Dynasty pattern; and Zahi Hawass because the architectural style of the pyramid complex and the extensive use of quality materials are typical of the era.

Dieter Arnold after examining a re-used block from Amenemhat I's pyramid believed to originate from Menkauhor's pyramid determined that it originated from neither Lepsius XXIX nor Lepsius L and concluded that Menkauhor's pyramid was yet to be uncovered, probably in South Saqqara.

== Sources ==
- Borchardt, Ludwig (1905). "Ein Königserlaß aus Dahschur". Zeitschrift für Ägyptische Sprache und Altertumskunde (in German). 41–42 (1): 1–42. ISSN 2196-713X.
- Davies, Normal (1900). The mastaba of Ptahhetep and Akhethetep at Saqqara. London: Egypt Exploration Fund.
- Dennis, James (1905). "New Officials of the IVth to Vth Dynasties". Proceedings of the Society of Biblical Archaeology. Vol. XXVII. London: The Offices of the Society. pp. 32–34.
- Hawass, Zahi (2010). "The excavation of the headless pyramid, Lepsius XXIX". Perspectives on ancient Egypt : studies in honor of Edward Brovarski. Cairo: Supreme Council of Antiquities. pp. 153–170. ISBN 9789777040877.
- Lehner, Mark (2008). The Complete Pyramids. New York: Thames & Hudson. ISBN 978-0-500-28547-3.
- Lepsius, Karl Richard (1970) [1849]. Denkmäler Aus Ägypten und Äthiopen (in German). Osnabrück: Biblio Verlag. OCLC 84318033.
- Porter, Bertha; Moss, Rosalind (1981) [1927]. Málek, Jaromír (ed.). The Topographical Bibliography of Ancient Egyptian Hieroglyphic Texts, Reliefs, and Paintings. Vol. III, 2 (2nd ed.). Oxford: Griffith Institute, Ashmolean Museum. ISBN 0-900416-238.
- Stadelmann, Rainer; Sourouzian, Hourig (1982). "Die Pyramiden des Snofru in Dahschur. Erster Bericht über die Ausgrabungen an der nördlichen Steinpyramide". Mitteilungen des Deutschen Archäologischen Instituts, Abteilung Kairo (in German). 38: 379–393. ISSN 0342-1279.
- Stadelmann, Rainer (2001). "Dahshur". In Redford, Donald B. (ed.). The Oxford Encyclopedia of Ancient Egypt, Volume 1. Oxford: Oxford University Press. pp. 354–356. ISBN 978-0-19-510234-5.
- Verner, Miroslav (2001). The Pyramids: The Mystery, Culture and Science of Egypt's Great Monuments. New York: Grove Press. ISBN 978-0-8021-1703-8.
- Wright, Jonathan (2008). "Eroded pyramid attributed to early pharaoh". Reuters. Archived from the original on December 22, 2015.
