= Pyramid of Ity =

Tomb of Egyptian pharaoh Ity

- Owner: Ity
Ancient name
< i t i i > G30 O24 B3w-Ity ("The Power of Ity")
- Constructed: 8th dynasty

The pyramid of Ity was probably the tomb of Pharaoh Ity ("the father/he who has come") who reigned during the 8th dynasty. It has never been discovered and is known only from a cliff-face inscription at Wadi Hammamat in the Eastern Desert, where there were several quarries in Pharaonic times.

The name of the pyramid, Baw-Iti ("the power of Ity"), may be a direct reference to the name of the pyramid of Neferefre, Netjeri-baw-Ra-nefer-ef ("the power of Neferefre is divine"), from the 5th Dynasty.

== The inscription in Wadi Hammamat ==
The partially damaged inscription records that two ship captains, Ipi and Nikauptah, had been sent on an expedition to the site in order to acquire building material for a pyramid in the first year of Ipi's reign. The inscription's statement of the number of troops on the expedition is damaged and may have been inscribed wrongly, so that it is uncertain what it said: Wolfgang Schenkel reads 200 rowers, 400(?) pioneers (?) and 200 rtn, while Christoffer Theis reads 200 soldiers and 200 emissaries with 200 men (interpreting this last figure as a correction), using line drawings made by Lepsius and Sethe. In addition to Ipi and Nikauptah, the names of two troop leaders, Thiemsaf and Irinakhti, are recorded. Detailed information on the type and amount of stone they sought is not recorded.

== Identifications ==
The English Egyptologist Flinders Petrie tentatively identified Ity with the Sixth dynasty Pharaoh Userkare, whose tomb has not yet been identified, but is probably in the area of Saqqara South known today as Tabbet al-Guesh, north-west of the mortuary complex of Pepi I. Petrie's identification relied solely on his estimation of the inscription to the Sixth Dynasty and the fact that Userkare was the only king of this period whose full titulary was not known. This identification is nowadays deemed conjectural

In the 1930s, Cecil Mallaby Firth suggested that the pyramid of Ity might be the Headless Pyramid at Saqqara. Firth supported this suggestion by reference to some pieces of pink granite and the broken lid of a sarcophagus found there, but could offer no other evidence. The Headless Pyramid has subsequently been identified as the tomb of King Menkauhor Kaiu of the 5th dynasty and Firth's theory is thus obsolete.

== See also ==
- Egyptian pyramid construction techniques
- List of Egyptian pyramids
- Lepsius list of pyramids

== Bibliography ==
- Baud, Michel; Dobrev, Vassil (1995). "De nouvelles annales de l'Ancien Empire Egyptien. Une "Pierre de Palerme" pour la VIe dynastie" (PDF). Bulletin de l'Institut Français d'Archéologie Orientale (in French). 95: 23–92. Archived from the original (PDF) on 2015-04-02.
- C. R. Lepsius: Denkmaeler aus Aegypten und Aethiopien. Part II: Denkmäler des alten Reichs. Volume 4. Nicolai, Berlin 1850, Tab. 115f., (Online version).
- Petrie, William Matthew Flinders (1907). A History of Egypt. Volume 1: from the earliest times to the XVIth dynasty (6th ed.). London: Methuen & co. OCLC 1524193.
- Wolfgang Schenkel: Memphis – Herakleopolis – Theben. Die epigraphischen Zeugnisse der 7.–11. Dynastie Ägyptens. (= Ägyptologische Abhandlungen (ÄA). Vol. 12, ISSN 1614-6379). Harrassowitz, Wiesbaden 1965, p. 26.
- Kurt Sethe: Urkunden des Alten Reichs (= Urkunden des ägyptischen Altertums. Part 1). 1. Vol, 2. No. 2., heavily revised edition. Hinrichs'sche Buchhandlung, Leipzig 1933, p. 148, (PDF; 10,6 MB).
- Christoffer Theis: "Die Pyramiden der Ersten Zwischenzeit. Nach philologischen und archäologischen Quellen." Studien zur Altägyptischen Kultur. Vol. 39, 2010, ISSN 0340-2215, pp. 321–339.
