= Lepsius I Pyramid =

Ruined monument in Abu Rawash, Egypt

Coordinates: 30°2′27″N 31°5′40″E

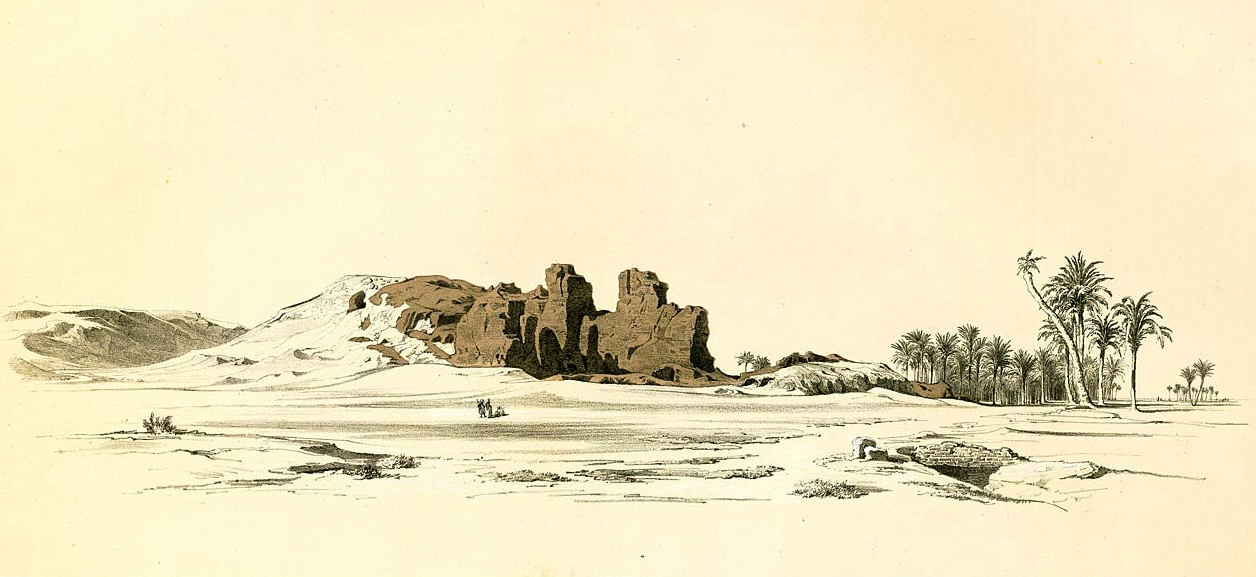
- View of the Lepsius I pyramid from south east
- Interactive map of Lepsius I Pyramid
- Constructed: c. 2650 BC
- Height: c. 129 meters (original)
- Base: c. meters (original)

The Lepsius I Pyramid is the ruin of a large mud brick monument in Abu Rawash near Cairo. So far, it has not been attributed to any ruler. It is located to the east of the Pyramid of Djedefre. It owes its enigmatic name to the Egyptologist Karl Richard Lepsius, who placed it first in his list of pyramids of Egypt. The shape of the monument is still subject to debate since some Egyptologists see it as a mastaba.

The monument was first studied in 1837 by John S. Perring. He believed it to be a very early pyramid and considered that it was the Pyramid of Djer. However, Lepsius dated the pyramid to the late 3rd dynasty and proposed it was the Pyramid of Huni.

== See also ==
- List of Egyptian pyramids
