= Pyramid G3-c =

Pyramid in the Giza complex

G3-c
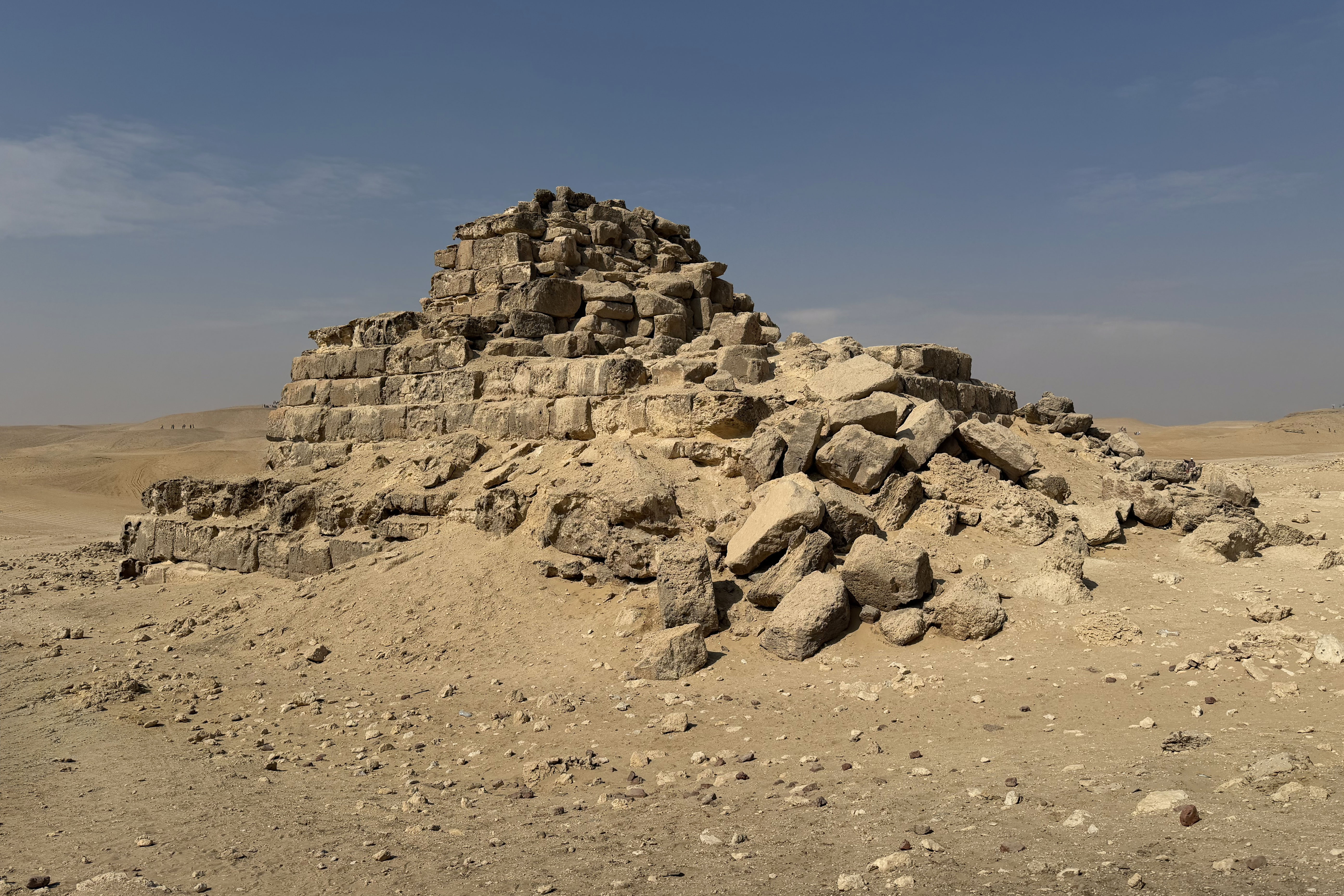
- Interactive map of G3-c
- Coordinates: 29°58′18″N 31°07′38″E
- Constructed: c. 2510 BC
- Height: 21.2 meters
- Base: 31.24 meters

G3-c (also G3c, G3 c, GIIIc) is one of the three satellite pyramids of the larger Pyramid of Menkaure, located at the Giza pyramid complex. This structure is situated south of the main pyramid and is the westernmost of the three satellites.

The American archaeologist George Andrew Reisner speculated that either this pyramid or G3-b may have been meant for Menkaure's half-sister, Shepsetkau, the daughter of Meresankh III and Khafre.

The pyramid was built during the Fourth Dynasty of Egypt, presumably for one of the wives of Menkaure. The surface of the pyramid is stepped, consisting of four platforms that decrease toward the top. The pyramid's base is 31.24 metres (102.5 ft) square, and its height is 21.2 metres (70 ft).

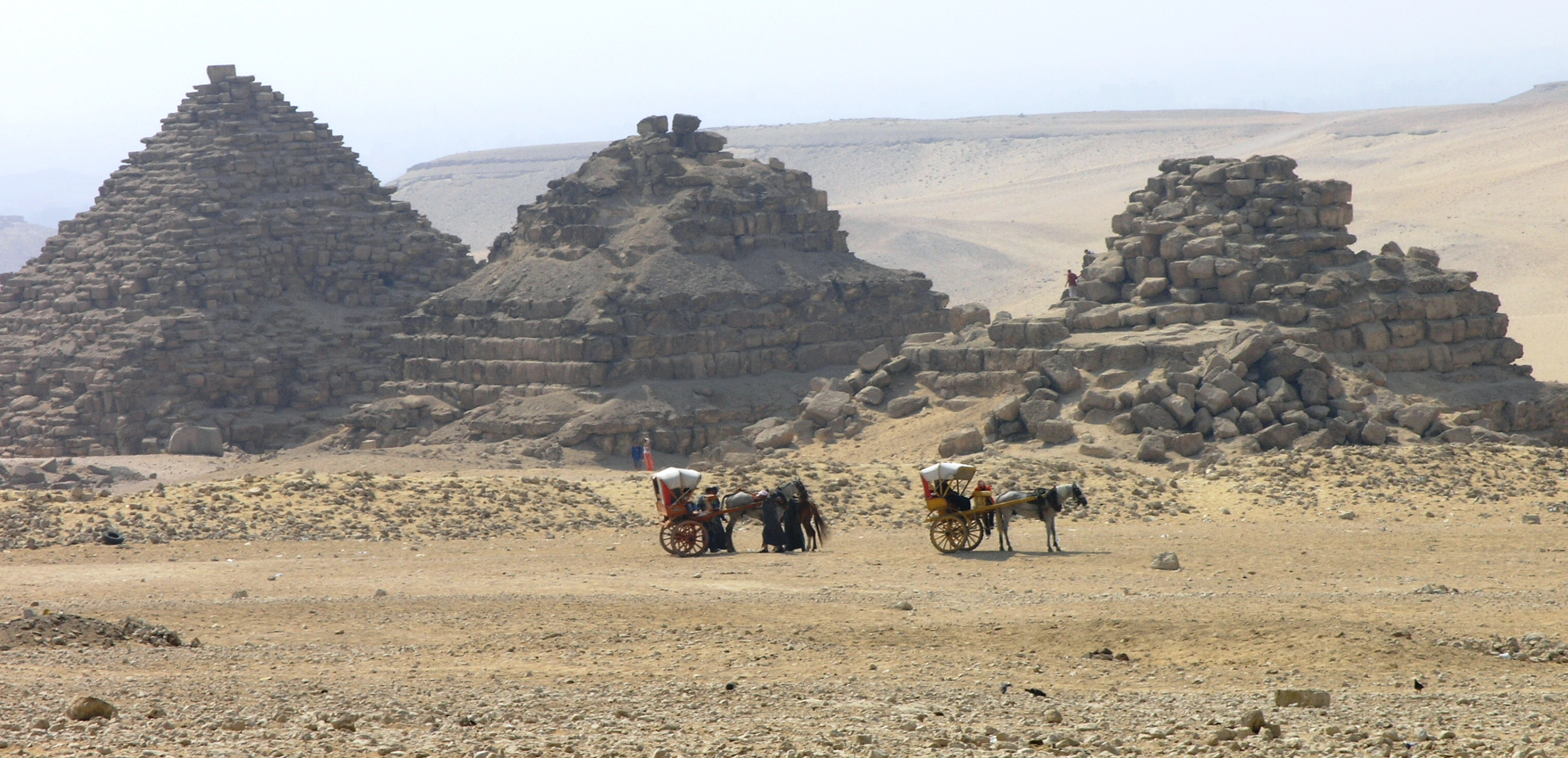
View of the pyramid companions from the north

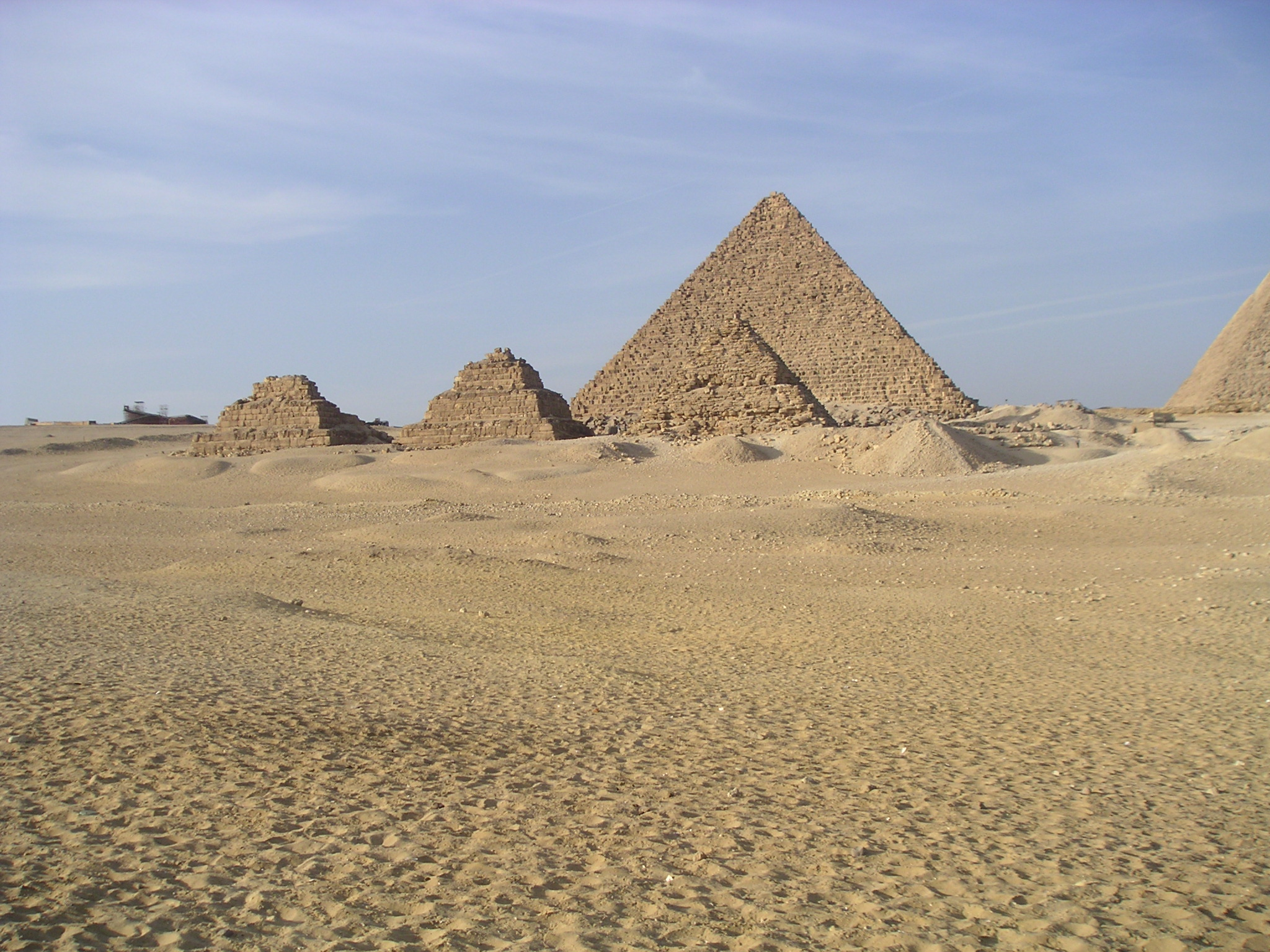
The pyramid-companions, with the Pyramid of Menkaure in the background

== See also ==
- List of Egyptian pyramids
- Pyramid_G3-a
- Pyramid_G3-b

== Bibliography ==
- Reisner, George Andrew (1942). A History of the Giza Necropolis. Vol. III. Harvard University. (Note: This is the second unpublished follow-up to Reisner's work A History of the Giza Necropolis Vol. I, published by Harvard University Press)
- Verner, Miroslav (2007). The Pyramids: The Mystery, Culture, and Science of Egypt's Great Monuments. New York City, NY: Grove Atlantic. ISBN 9780802198631.
