= Pyramid of Menkaure =

Smallest main pyramid of Giza in Egypt

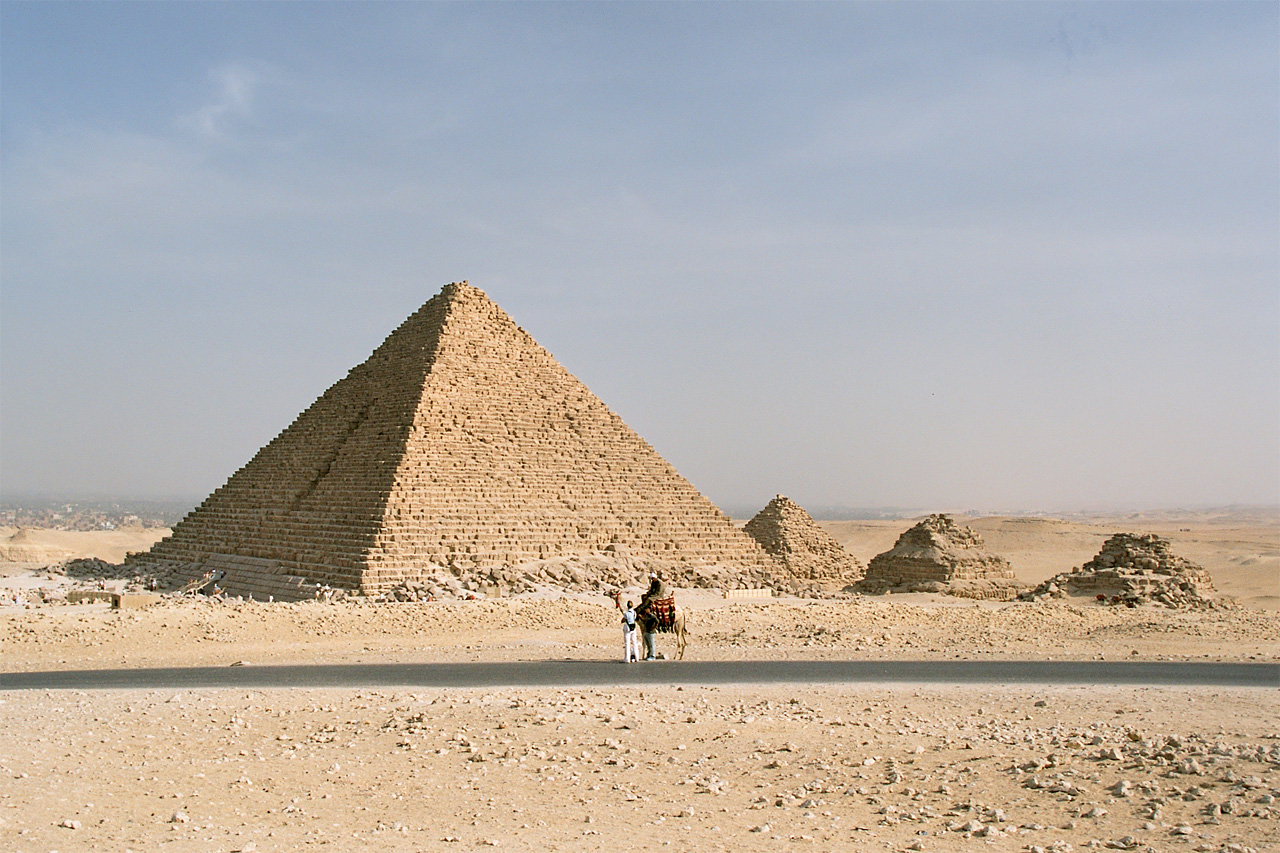
- The pyramid in 2004
- Interactive map of Pyramid of Menkaure
- 29°58′21″N 31°07′42″E
- Owner: Menkaure
Ancient name
< N5 Y5 D28 D28 D28 > R8 D21 O24
Nṯr.j Mn-kꜣw-Rꜥ
Netjeri Menkaure
Menkaure is Divine
- Constructed: c. 2500 BC (4th dynasty)
- Type: True Pyramid
- Material: limestone, core red granite, white limestone, casing
- Height: 65 metres (213 ft) or 125 cubits (original)
- Base: 102.2 by 104.6 metres (335 ft × 343 ft) or 200 cubits (original)
- Volume: 235,183 cubic metres (8,305,409 ft^{3})
- Slope: 51°20'25''

The pyramid of Menkaure (Arabic: هرم منقرع, romanized: Haram Manqaraʿ or Arabic: هرم منكاورع, romanized: Haram Minkāwraʿ) is the smallest of the three main pyramids of the Giza pyramid complex, located on the Giza Plateau in the southwestern outskirts of Cairo, Egypt. It is thought to have been built to serve as the tomb of the Fourth Dynasty King Menkaure. With roughly one tenth of the volume of the pyramid of Khufu, it is a part of an Egyptian pyramid complex comprising a mortuary temple and a valley temple linked by a causeway, together with three subsidiary pyramids on its southern side. Numerous signs of unfinished work indicate that the king died while the monument was still under construction, leaving its completion to his successor Shepseskaf.

== Size and construction ==
A diagram of the pyramid.

Menkaure's pyramid had an original height of 65.5 meters (215 ft), and was the smallest of the three major pyramids at the Giza Necropolis. It now stands at 61 m (200 ft) tall with a base of 108.5 m (356 ft). Its angle of incline is approximately 51°20′25″. It was constructed of limestone and Aswan granite.

As with the pyramid of Khafre, the ground chosen for the monument was uneven, and the builders compensated for this irregularity. Quarrymen cut into the western part of the limestone plateau, extracting large monoliths in a regular, systematic fashion; these were hauled to the eastern and southern sides of the perimeter, close to their point of extraction, where they were dressed and fitted to raise the ground to the level of the pyramid's foundations. The same procedure served for the platform of the mortuary temple and for the corridor leading to the causeway.

The body of the pyramid consists of large blocks of local limestone quarried nearby, laid in regular courses that form steps against which the casing blocks were set. The lowest sixteen courses of the casing, rising to a height of more than 20 metres (66 ft), were of red granite from Aswan; above this the casing was of fine limestone up to the pyramidion, which has disappeared and whose material (limestone or granite) is unknown. The construction of the granite casing was halted at sixteen to eighteen layers following Menkaure's death, only seven of which remain today due to vandalism and erosion. Part of the granite was left in the rough. Medieval quarrying of the pharaonic monuments concentrated on the fine limestone, which explains the loss of the upper casing; in the nineteenth century, part of the granite casing was in turn dismantled on the orders of Muhammad Ali, who reused it for the construction of the arsenal of Alexandria.

The great breach that scars the northern face (cf. below) of the pyramid exposes the internal structure of the monument. It shows that the pyramid was first conceived as a stepped structure, built in great steps of seven to eight courses each, three of which are currently visible, and was then converted into a true pyramid by filling in the steps with successive courses and applying the smooth casing.

A boat hieroglyph was found painted on a limestone block near the pyramid, which may indicate the presence of a boat pit for a solar barque.

== Age and location ==
The pyramid's date of construction is unknown, because Menkaure's reign has not been accurately defined, but it was probably completed in the 26th century BC. It is a few hundred meters southwest of the pyramid of Khafre and the Great Pyramid of Khufu in the Giza necropolis.

Authors Bob Brier and Hoyt Hobbs argue that the pyramid was likely robbed as early as the First Intermediate Period. They claim that "all the pyramids were robbed" by the New Kingdom, when the construction of royal tombs in the Valley of the Kings began.

== Substructure ==
The entrance to the pyramid is located in the center of its northern face in the thickness of the casing's fifth course, sitting about 4.2 meters above the average base of the pyramid and almost directly below the great breach. it was finally located in 1837 by Howard Vyse.

A descending passage, faced with granite where it crosses the body of the monument, cuts down into the bedrock and opens into a first antechamber. Rectangular in plan, its walls carry carved paneling imitating a palace façade consisting of eleven niches on each of the longer walls, cut in the carefully dressed rock and finished with plaster; this is the first appearance of decoration of any kind in the internal rooms of a pyramid, the monuments of Menkaure's predecessors being entirely plain (the only earlier pyramid with decorated internal chambers is that of Djoser at Saqqara).

Immediately beyond lies the portcullis chamber, fitted with a sliding arrangement of three granite portcullises barring access to the rest of the apartments. A gently sloping corridor then leads to a large rectangular room, oriented east–west and opening at its western end onto a broad niche, separated from the room by two buttresses beneath a decorated architrave; a rectangular depression in the floor of the niche appears to have been cut to receive an embedded sarcophagus of which only the lid would have projected, and Maragioglio and Rinaldi concluded that the niche served as the provisional burial place of an earlier scheme, abandoned when the definitive burial chamber was begun. High in the northern wall of this room opens a second corridor, first nearly horizontal and then rising back through the rock into the masonry of the core, where it terminates without any external exit; it was excavated from the outside inwards and later plugged with limestone blocks. It is interpreted as the access corridor of the initial project, made obsolete when the pyramid was enlarged, and is now a blind alley.

A third arrangement was discovered beneath the rectangular room: a corridor cut into its floor descends to a large chamber, more than six metres long and 2.6 metres wide. Oriented north–south, it is lined with red Aswan granite and roofed with nine pairs of great granite beams set as chevrons, whose soffits were recut into a curve, giving the room the appearance of a slightly pointed barrel vault (the same roofing device was later adopted by Shepseskaf for the tomb he built for himself at Saqqara). Shortly before the granite burial chamber, a doorway in the northern wall of the access corridor leads by a stairway of seven steps to a room set at an angle of about 25° to the north, off which open six storerooms cut into the rock, four on the east side and two on the north; their use has been interpreted as chambers for the canopic jars and the crowns of Upper and Lower Egypt.

Maragioglio and Rinaldi reconstructed the sequence of works as follows: the upper corridor and a chamber a fraction of the size of the present rectangular room were first excavated from the north, in accordance with an original project whose details are unknown; a single radical change of plan, made when the apartments were only just begun, then enlarged the chamber to its present dimensions, cut the niche as a provisional burial place, and drove the lower system of corridors and the cave in which the granite burial chamber was built, the chamber of the storerooms being added shortly after; the later modifications are of no great importance and cannot be considered a third plan. The holes found in the floor and walls of the large rectangular room are thought to have held the beams of a scaffolding used to assist the introduction of the sarcophagus and the handling of the granite blocks of the burial chamber, the room thus serving as a working space during construction.

This is the first time the funerary apartments of a royal pyramid were developed to such an extent. Later royal tombs took up and elaborated the internal plan of Menkaure's pyramid; the tombs of Khentkaus I and Shepseskaf, and the royal pyramids of the Fifth Dynasty, retained its governing elements (the antechamber preceding the portcullis chamber, the vault divided into an antechamber and a sarcophagus chamber, and the storeroom chambers, whose role has not yet been established). The decoration of the first antechamber and of Menkaure's sarcophagus, by contrast, remained without parallel: decorative schemes of comparable elaboration do not reappear in royal pyramids before the Sixth Dynasty, more than a century and a half later.

== Sarcophagus and coffin ==
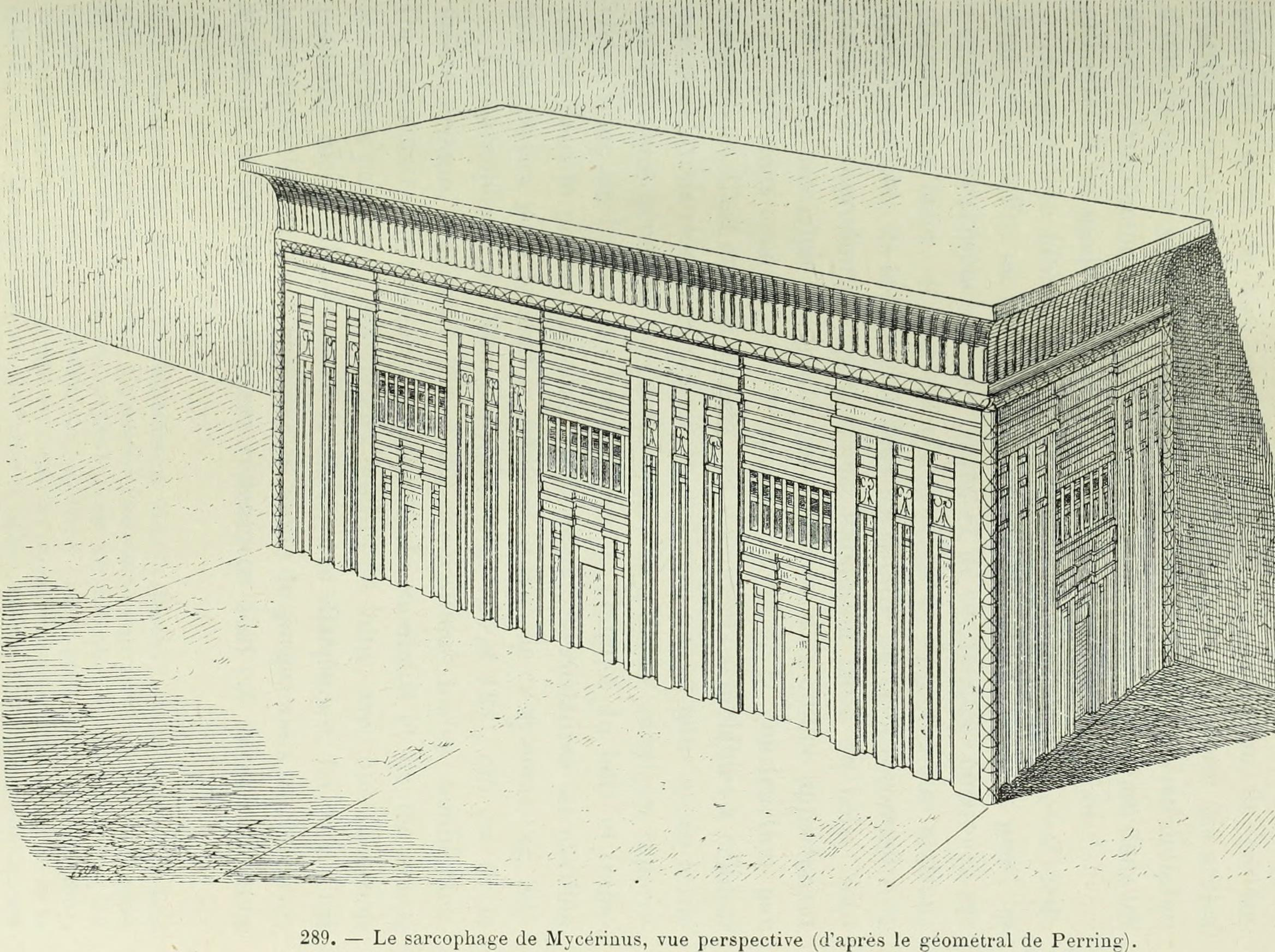
The sarcophagus of Menkaure

In 1837, Howard Vyse and John Shae Perring discovered the basalt sarcophagus of Menkaure in the granite burial chamber, displaced from its original position against the west wall. It was decorated in the palace-façade style: its long sides carried four recessed bastions framing three false doors, its short sides repeated the same scheme reduced to two bastions and a single false door, and the whole was framed by a band and crowned with an Egyptian cavetto cornice, the lid being fitted with the same rounded-dovetail-and-peg system as the sarcophagi of Khufu and Khafre.

Its extraction required considerable effort. Perring dismantled the granite blocks facing the north wall of the burial chamber, and the damage to the doorway of the portcullis chamber, of which only parts of the lintel and one jamb survive, is likewise attributed to his removal work. Hauled out through the descending passage, the sarcophagus was crated, transported to Alexandria and shipped for England. The Beatrice, the vessel carrying it to London together with other antiquities, went down with all its cargo in a violent storm in 1838; the only surviving records of the sarcophagus are the drawings published by Vyse and a watercolour by the French Egyptologist Émile Prisse d'Avennes.

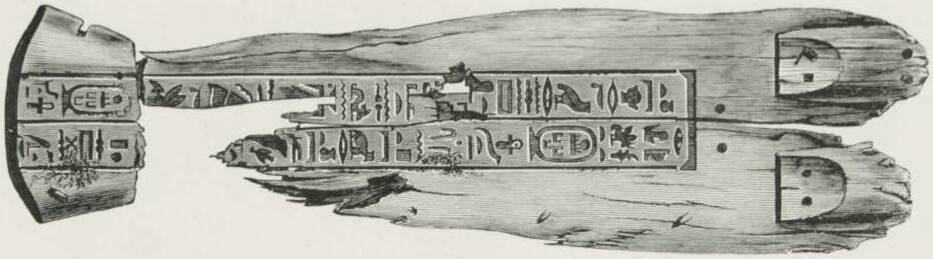
A coffin lid found in the pyramid of Menkaure

In the rubble filling the upper rectangular room, Vyse found the lid of a wooden anthropoid coffin inscribed with Menkaure's name and some of his titles, together with the remains of a human body wrapped in a coarse cloth; both were later transferred to the British Museum. The coffin was radiocarbon-dated to 1212–846 BC, from the late New Kingdom to the Third Intermediate Period, showing that it was fabricated long after the king's death, presumably in the course of a restoration of the plundered tomb. The male body and its shroud were carbon-dated to the early Islamic Period.

== Pyramid complex ==
The funerary complex of Menkaure is the third and last of the great royal building projects erected at Giza under the Fourth Dynasty. The ensemble follows a regular plan, aligning the constituent elements of an Egyptian pyramid complex: the temple for the cult of the dead king stands against the eastern face of the pyramid, linked to a valley temple by a causeway more than six hundred metres long. This causeway, once roofed, runs perfectly straight, unlike those of the pyramids of Khufu and Khafre, which deviate from the principal axes of their monumental complexes. The causeway of large limestone blocks is a continuation of the foundation platform of the mortuary temple, running eastward down the slope to join the foundations of the valley temple.

All around the royal monument lie necropolises and further tombs of princes and queens, complementing the king's tomb, whose cult was maintained throughout the Old Kingdom. Besides the three queens' pyramids built on the southern flank of the king's pyramid, a necropolis of the priests of the royal cult was installed southeast of the mortuary temple, in the quarry that had served for the construction of the monuments. A second necropolis lies north of the causeway, dominated by the tomb of Queen Khentkaus I, a relative of Menkaure, which is sometimes described as the "Fourth Pyramid of Giza"; in front of this tomb, a causeway adjoins a priests' town connected to the landing stage below the valley temple.

Recent archaeological findings from the Giza plateau show that pyramid construction relied on a Nile-connected harbor system to move large stones. Sediment cores and reconstructed waterways suggest that ports close to Giza operated through the Fourth Dynasty, allowing limestone blocks and materials to effectively reach the plateau. This harbor system supported not only Khufu's and Khafre's projects but also later construction at Menkaure's pyramid complex.

=== Mortuary temple ===
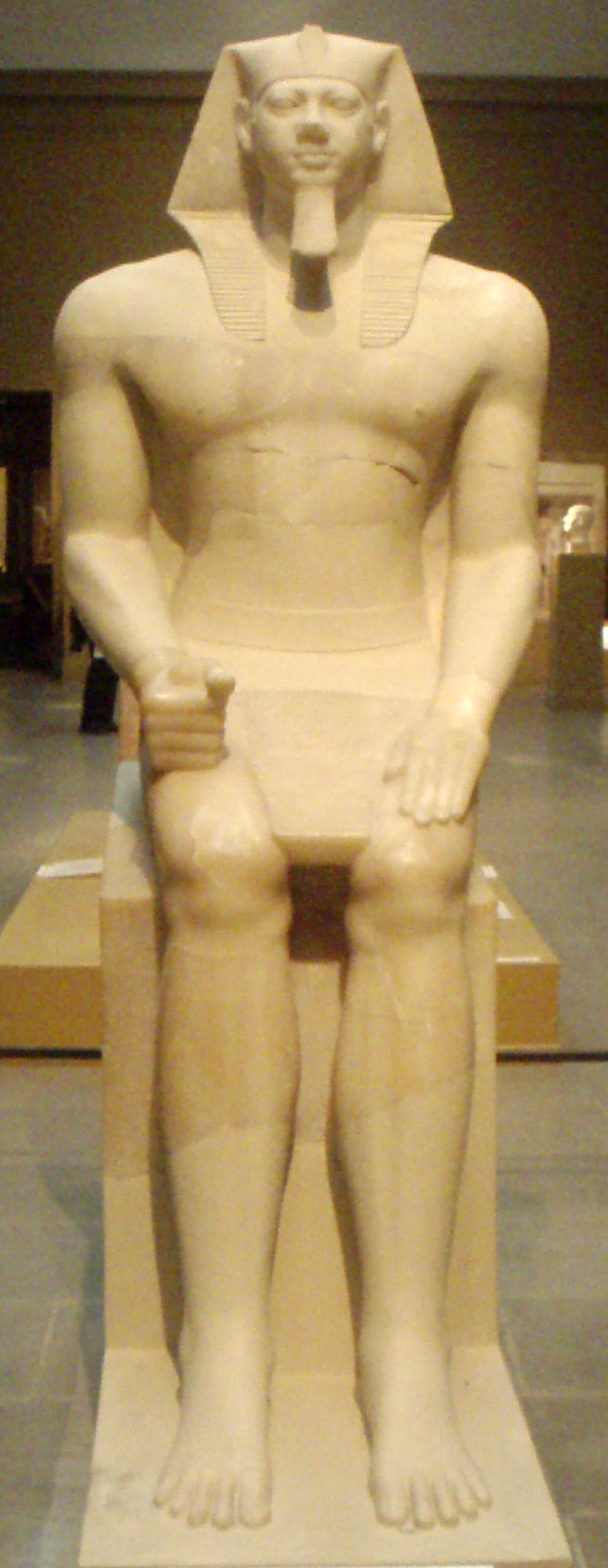
Alabaster colossus of Menkaure discovered in the mortuary temple

The mortuary temple of Menkaure lies east of the king's pyramid. It does not abut the pyramid's flank, but is separated from it by an enclosure (peribolos) within which stands the cult chapel. The large temple itself, built of limestone, consists of a great open court giving access to the inner rooms and to the storerooms that held the food offerings and cult equipment for the daily rites. On the northern side, a corridor led to the rear of the temple, to the peribolos and to the chapel that housed the king's funerary stela, the object of the cult performed there. This chapel comprised a small open court set against the eastern face of the pyramid, whose casing was dressed back at this point; the stela itself has disappeared. In front of the court stood a roofed antechamber giving access to an annex chapel to the south, the whole being reached from the peribolos through a door in the northern wall of the antechamber. The ensemble was later enlarged by the addition of a new antechamber preceding the first and giving access to a series of five small rooms or chapels, doubling the initial arrangement, probably in response to the requirements of the royal cult under the following dynasties.

In the mortuary temple, the foundations and the inner core were made of limestone, resting on a platform of large blocks of local limestone. The floors were begun with granite and granite facings were added to some of the walls: the portico and outer offering room received a finished casing of red granite, while the entrance corridor, open court and northern corridor carried an unfinished casing of black granite. Both temples were finished with crude bricks. Reisner estimated that some of the blocks of local stone in the walls of the mortuary temple weighed as much as 220 tons, while the heaviest granite ashlars imported from Aswan weighed more than 30 tons.

The study of the monument has revealed two construction phases developing the initial plan: a first under Menkaure, then a second under his successor Shepseskaf, who finished the complex; a stela found in the temple portico states that he "made it as his monument for his father, the King of Upper and Lower Egypt [Menkaure]". In the first phase, the temple court was to be provided with porticoes of granite pillars and its walls faced with the same material as the pyramid casing. The architects of Menkaure had thus planned a mortuary temple and a pyramid entirely clad in granite, but the king's death left the work unfinished. Shepseskaf, who inherited both the throne and the charge of completing his father's pyramid complex, modified the plan and employed cheaper, more practical materials to hasten its completion: the granite casing was covered in crude brick, heavily plastered and coated white, and in the great court the brick facing was built in a system of niches at regular intervals, imitating a palace façade. These niches constitute the only decoration of the monument, no relief having been discovered in the temple.

Following a catastrophe that gravely damaged the pyramid complex under the Sixth Dynasty, the crude-brick inner temple was rebuilt in limestone, a reconstruction Reisner ascribed to Merenre on the evidence of a limestone decree bearing his name found in the temple. Subsequent architectural additions and two stelae from the Sixth Dynasty suggest that a cult for the pharaoh was maintained, or was periodically renewed, for two centuries after his death. Menkaure's ambitious project of an all-granite pyramid and mortuary temple thus never came to fruition, but his cult endured to the end of the Old Kingdom: seal impressions found in the temple attest that the service was still maintained under Nyuserre, Isesi, Teti and Pepi I.

Fragmentary alabaster statues were discovered in this temple by George Andrew Reisner, who conducted exhaustive excavations on the site from 1906 to 1924. The fragments are kept at the Museum of Fine Arts in Boston; some could be reassembled, reconstituting a colossal statue of the king, shown young, wearing the nemes and a kilt of fine pleated linen.

=== Causeway ===
Of the causeway, more than six hundred metres long, only the emplacement remains that linked the valley temple of the complex to the mortuary temple adjoining the peribolos of the king's pyramid. Access was through two doors, one on the forecourt of the valley temple, the other south of the inner rooms west of the same temple's court; they opened onto a corridor that skirted the temple along its southern flank and rejoined the central axis of the complex behind it. Processions could thus take the causeway directly up to the pyramid and its mortuary temple, or, after performing the rites in the great court of the valley temple, pass through the western rooms and join the causeway by the corridor perpendicular to the temple axis.

The causeway itself was probably never finished, owing to the king's death. Everything (the unfinished casing of the pyramid, the two building phases of the mortuary temple, the state of the causeway) indicates that Menkaure did not live to complete his funerary complex. Shepseskaf completed the ensemble, building on the limestone causeway a corridor of mud brick, plastered white inside and out and roofed with wooden logs. The corridor opened directly into the mortuary temple, widening just before the entrance doorway to form a sort of hall, with a doorway giving exit on each side.

=== Valley temple ===
The Menkaure valley temple was excavated between 1908 and 1910 by American archaeologist George Andrew Reisner. The temple overlooked the harbour and served as the funerary complex. The king's architects originally planned a vast building of limestone and granite. According to Vito Maragioglio and Celeste Rinaldi, who studied the temple and surveyed its plan, the structure was so little advanced at the king's death that the original design can no longer be reconstructed.

Like the rest of the complex, the valley temple had barely begun construction at the time of the king's death. The foundation platform of local limestone and the first courses of a few walls had been laid, and its abandonment coincided with the cessation of work on the mortuary temple. Practically the whole temple therefore had to be built by Shepseskaf, who, as at the mortuary temple, used crude brick, filling the space around the unfinished stone platform with hard-packed gravel to prepare the foundation. His temple comprised a vestibule with magazines, a great open court, a sanctuary with magazines, and an exterior corridor leading to the causeway corridor. The entrance vestibule contained a nearly square anteroom whose roof was carried on four wooden columns resting on alabaster bases, flanked on each side by four magazines opening from a corridor. The great open court, crossed by a stone-paved pathway, had walls decorated with offering niches (one compound niche alternating with three simple ones) like those of the king's mortuary temple.

Like the rest of the complex, however, the valley temple was barely begun at the king's death: only the foundation platform of local limestone and the first courses of a few walls had been laid, and its abandonment coincided with the cessation of work on the mortuary temple. Practically the whole temple therefore had to be built by Shepseskaf, who, as at the mortuary temple, used crude brick, filling the space around the unfinished stone platform with hard-packed gravel to prepare the foundation. His temple comprised a vestibule with magazines, a great open court, a sanctuary with magazines, and an exterior corridor leading to the causeway corridor. The entrance vestibule contained a nearly square anteroom whose roof was carried on four wooden columns resting on alabaster bases, flanked on each side by four magazines opening from a corridor. The great open court, crossed by a stone-paved pathway, had walls decorated with offering niches (one compound niche alternating with three simple ones) like those of the king's mortuary temple. Beyond the court, on the higher western part of the platform, lay the sanctuary (a portico and offering room) with its magazine corridors: utensils were stored in the northern magazines, statues in the southern rooms.

Reisner discovered The southern rooms, as well as the sanctuary a series of statues showing the king accompanied by divinities, commonly known as the triads of Menkaure. Five such statue groups were found, four intact and one fragmentary. In each, the king is accompanied by the goddess Hathor, shown standing or seated, and by a third divinity personifying one of the nomes of the country; the four slate triads found intact stood in the southern magazine corridor, two against the east wall facing south and two against the west wall facing north. Menkaure is shown standing, wearing the white crown of Upper Egypt and a ceremonial kilt, athletic and eternally young, striding forward encouraged by Hathor, who participates in the king's resurrection. A sixth group, this time a dyad, shows Menkaure in the same attitude, here wearing the nemes, accompanied by a queen; it was found in a plunderers' hole beneath the floor of the southern magazine corridor. Other statues of the king, unfinished and in various stages of carving, were recovered from the statue rooms and make it possible to appreciate the working methods of Egyptian sculptors, and four seated alabaster statues inscribed with Menkaure's name were found in the anteroom of the later temple, having originally stood in the portico. Fragments of alabaster statues were also brought to light, notably a head of the king wearing a short round wig with a uraeus on the brow, first interpreted as a portrait of Shepseskaf and subsequently, on the basis of comparative study with the king's other portraits, as one of Menkaure. Three of the four intact triads are kept at the Egyptian Museum in Cairo; the fourth, the dyad, the fragmentary triad, the unfinished statues and the alabaster fragments are in the Museum of Fine Arts, Boston. All were carved in the naturalistic style of the Old Kingdom, with a high degree of detail.

The valley temple shows a final state involving substantial modifications linked to prolonged use of the site. Reisner concluded that the village of small mud-brick structures, rooms and granaries that filled the temple, whose general appearance was that of a poor modern village, was the pyramid city of Menkaure itself, whose inhabitants, the priests of the pyramid temples and trustees of the pyramid endowments, were granted by decree exemption from taxes and from the exactions of officials. A badly weathered decree stela of Pepi II mentioning Menkaure was found in the vestibule of the temple. The first crude-brick temple was destroyed by an inrush of rain water that ruined the sanctuary, after which a second crude-brick temple, consisting merely of the sanctuary and enclosing walls (which were really the walls of the city), was built on the surface of decay, at latest around the middle of the reign of Pepi II. Houses continued to encroach on the temple, with tightly packed rooms, granaries and narrow passages reaching into the court. Once the privileges of the pyramid city lapsed, not long after the end of the Sixth Dynasty, all incentive to live in the city or maintain the temple was destroyed; the site was abandoned, fell rapidly into decay and was soon covered with sand and forgotten, no pottery found on the site being as late as the Middle Kingdom.

=== Queens' pyramids ===
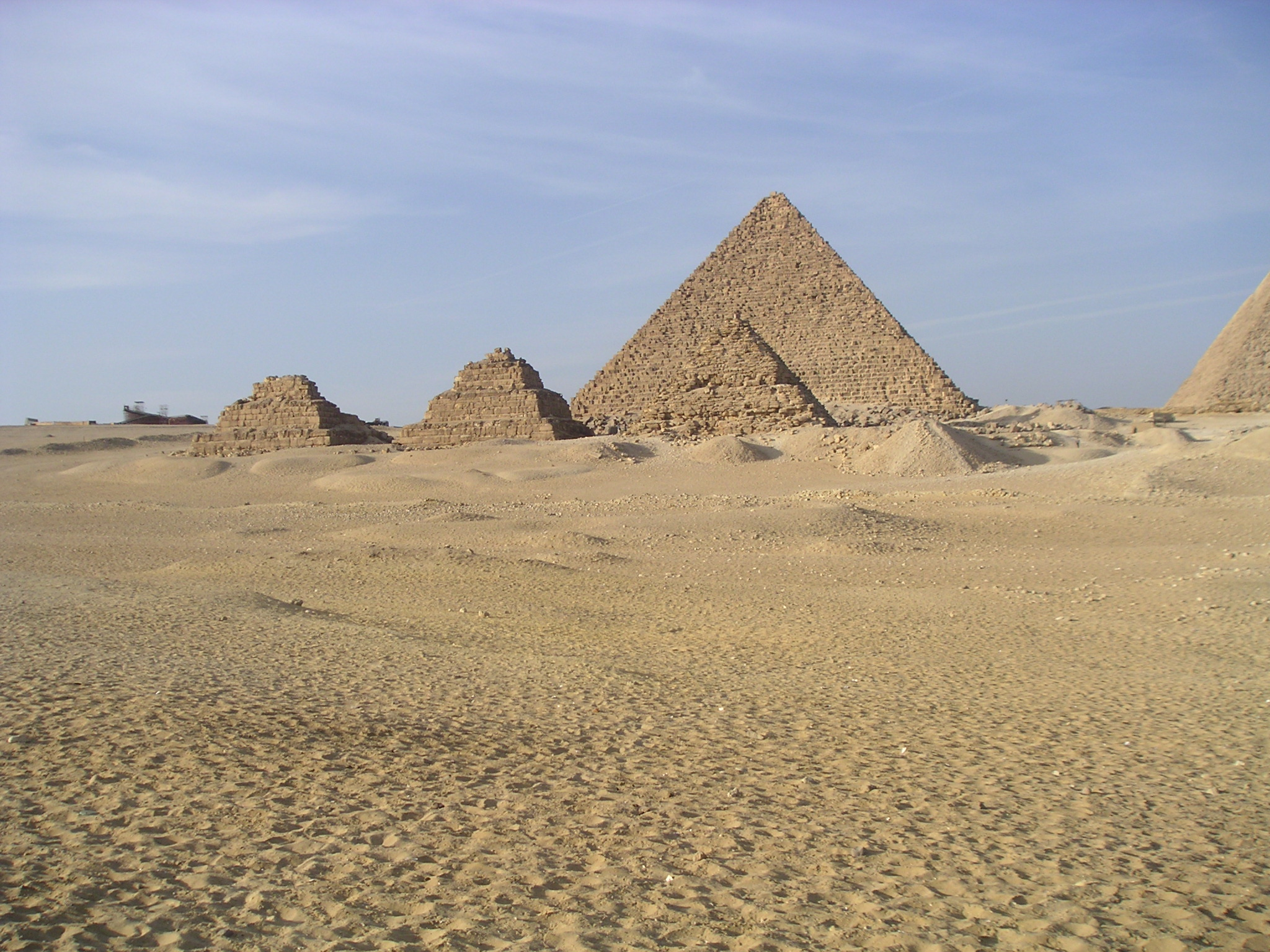
The pyramid of Menkaure in the background with the pyramids G3-a, G3-b, and G3-c in front (right to left), 2004

South of the pyramid of Menkaure, close to the crude-brick wall enclosing the more intimate precincts of the pyramid itself, are three smaller pyramids, aligned east to west and designated G3-a, G3-b, and G3-c, each accompanied by a small crude-brick temple set against its eastern face and a substructure. The three pyramids were surrounded by a thick rubble enclosure wall of their own, entered near its northeastern corner by a pathway leading off toward the inner part of the king's mortuary temple.

The easternmost (G3-a) is the largest, most prominent and most elaborate of the three, and the only one with the shape of a true pyramid, with a base of 84 cubits (about 144 ft), a slope of 52°15′ and an original height of about 28.4 metres (93 ft); it still stands some 25.4 metres (83 ft) high. The first course of its casing was of red granite from Aswan, never dressed smooth on the eastern face where it was covered by the back wall of the temple; the pyramid was probably cased over its whole height, though whether entirely in granite, as Reisner held, or with fine limestone above the granite base, as Vyse thought and as Maragioglio and Rinaldi consider more likely, is uncertain. It is believed to have been completed, due to the limestone pyramidion found close by. On its northern face, an entrance opens onto a descending passage, faced with masonry at first and then cut in the rock at a slope of 27°12′, entirely plugged with squared blocks; it widens at its lower end into a small chamber holding a granite portcullis, beyond which a short horizontal corridor leads to an unfaced rock-cut burial chamber near the centre of the base, in the western part of which a granite sarcophagus was found embedded in a hole in the floor, its lid wrenched from its seating. Its temple, entered from the north from the pathway serving the three pyramids, comprises an entrance corridor, an open court with niched walls and a portico, and an inner part with a hall of niches, offering rooms and a stairway to the roof; its niched court and screen wall repeat the characteristic features of the king's two temples. Like the king's mortuary and valley temples, it was planned in stone (of which only the foundation platform was laid) and finished in crude brick after Menkaure's death on the orders of Shepseskaf, work on all four temples having been proceeding simultaneously when the king died. Neither of the other two pyramids progressed beyond the construction of the inner core.

Reisner speculated that the structures were likely tombs for the queens of Menkaure's family; as the tomb of the most important lady of the family, he attributed G3-a specifically to the king's wife, Queen Khamerernebty II, though the question remains open, as another tomb at Giza is attributed to the same queen. He noted, however, that the excavation of the three pyramids and their temples yielded no material actually identifying their owners; the only inscribed objects from the temple of G3-a, five alabaster model cups naming "the king's son Kay" found in a pot sunk beneath the floor of the hall of niches, were a later offering, perhaps by a pious descendant. The archaeologist Mark Lehner argues that pyramid G3-a has a layout akin to a ka pyramid, which would have housed a statue of the king rather than a body. The fact that the structure once contained a pink granite sarcophagus has led scholars to speculate that it may have been reused as a queen's burial tomb, or that it served as a chapel where the body of Menkaure was mummified.

The two other pyramids are step pyramids in four stages. The are essentially duplicates in size and form. They were left uncased, though the carelessness of their coursing indicates they were intended to be cased in better stone. Each has a descending passage entered from its northern face leading to underground chambers, cleared out by Vyse. In the inner chamber of pyramid G3-b, Vyse found a small granite sarcophagus, undecorated and uninscribed, containing bones (including a jawbone probably of a young woman), rotten wood and fragments of bandages, though no inscription identifies its owner; on one of the roofing beams of the burial chamber, a quarry mark traced in red includes the clearly legible name of Menkaure, probably as part of a work-crew name, attesting that the pyramid was built in his reign. Reisner concluded that its owner was a young woman who died after Menkaure, probably a second wife of the king. The exploration of the third pyramid yielded no sarcophagus, its large inner chamber having been left unfinished; Vyse believed the burial place was never occupied, but Reisner judged the evidence insufficient, and the existence of its chapel indicates that someone was originally interred there. G3-c is in a far more degraded state than G3-b, only three incomplete steps and scanty traces of the fourth remaining; Vyse attributed its destruction to artillery practice by Napoleon's army, though the damage was in any case done long after the decay of its temple. Nothing found in either pyramid or chapel gives any hint of the owners' names.

== Attempted demolition ==
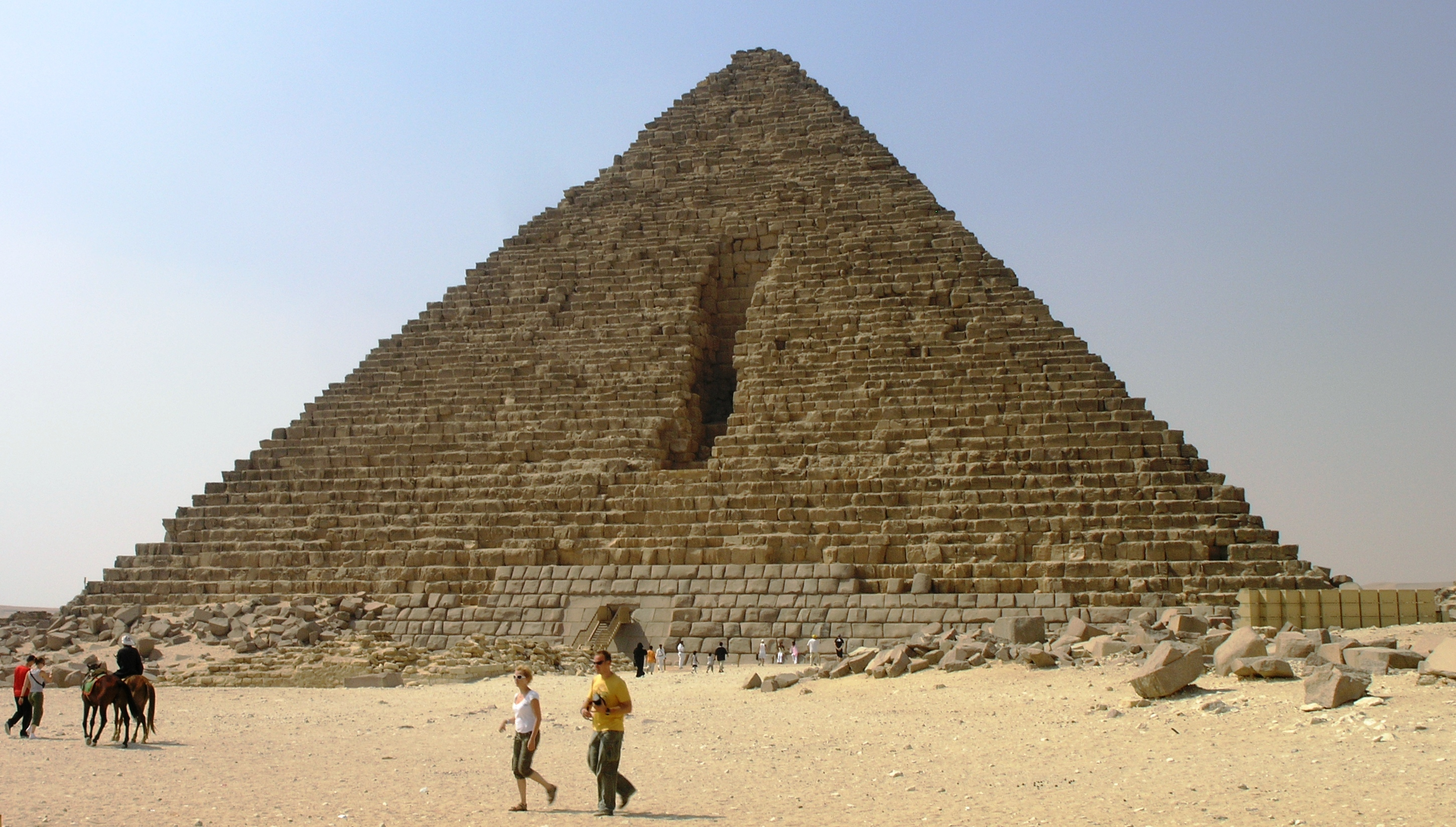
Damage to the pyramid, by Sultan Al-Aziz Uthman, pictured in 2008

In 1196, Al-Aziz Uthman, Saladin's son and the Sultan of Egypt, attempted to demolish the pyramids, starting with that of Menkaure. Workmen recruited to demolish the pyramid stayed at their job for eight months, but the task was expensive and slow. Workers were only able to remove one or two stones each day at most. Some used wedges and levers to move the stones, while others used ropes to pull them down.

When a stone fell, it would bury itself in the sand, requiring extraordinary efforts to free it. Wedges were used to split the stones into several pieces, and a cart was used to carry it to the foot of the escarpment, where it was left. Despite their efforts, workmen were only able to damage the pyramid to the extent of leaving a large vertical gash at its northern face.

The workmen attacked the northern face at a height of some twenty metres in the pyramid's casing, drawing on experience acquired on the two neighbouring great pyramids and hoping to discover the entrance of the monument there; finding nothing, they prolonged the breach. This irreparable destruction, which disfigures the northern face, nevertheless permits the study of the monument's internal constitution (cf. above).

== Restoration attempt ==
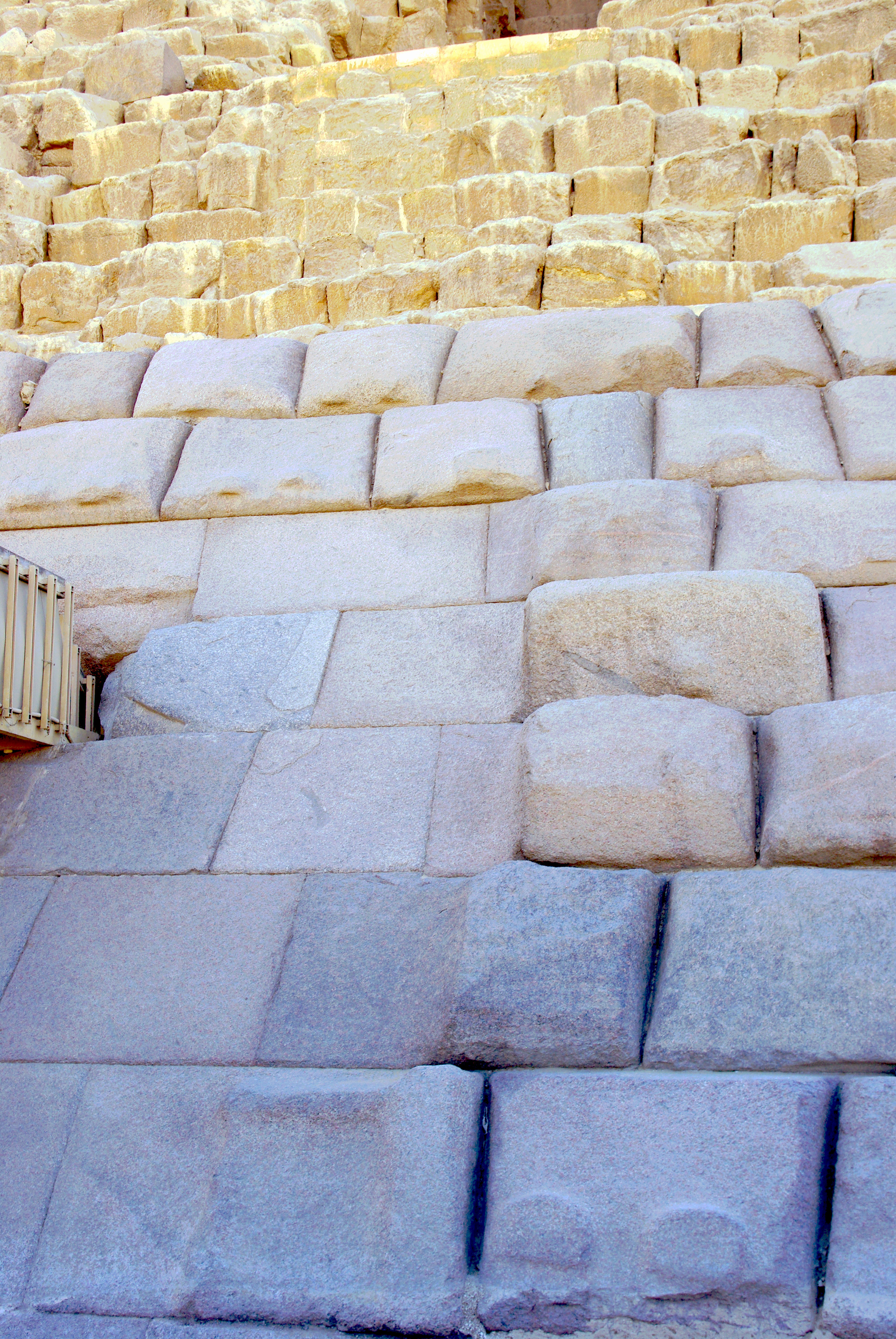
Granite casing blocks of Menkaure's Pyramid next to the entrance. Many are visibly unfinished, probably halted in mid-work due to the death of the pharaoh.

In January 2024, a joint project of the Supreme Council of Antiquities and Waseda University to study and document the outer granite blocks lying around the base of the pyramid, regarded by the project's leaders as fallen casing, began, with the goal to reinstall them. The project was planned to take three years to complete. In a video published on Facebook, the secretary-general of the Supreme Council of Antiquities, Mostafa Waziri, shown alongside workers aligning granite blocks at the base of the pyramid, described the undertaking as "Egypt's gift to the world in the 21st century", which would allow visitors to see, for the first time, the pyramid as the ancient Egyptians had built it. Weeks after the announcement, the re-installation was abandoned following backlash by researchers and a report by a team of experts called in by Egyptian officials and led by Zahi Hawass, Egypt's former minister of antiquities, which "unanimously objected to the re-installation of the granite casing blocks scattered around the base of the pyramid".

== East-face anomalies ==
In 2019, Stijn van den Hoven hypothesized that behind the smoothed area of the granite casing on the eastern face lies a yet to be discovered second entrance to the pyramid. A combination of three non-destructive techniques revealed two anomalies directly behind these granite blocks, which indicate the presence of air-filled voids. The purpose and depths of these anomalies could not be determined with the methods used.

== Classical and medieval accounts ==
Herodotus, in his Histories (written around the 440s BC), recounts the story of Mycerinus (Menkaure) and describes his pyramid as square and built of "Ethiopian stone" up to half its height, but much smaller than that of his father (in reality, his grandfather), twenty feet lower and with sides three plethra wide. He reports that some Greeks attributed it to the courtesan Rhodopis, a claim he rejects: in his view they did not even know who Rhodopis was, the construction of a pyramid had cost millions of talents, and Rhodopis lived not under Menkaure but under Amasis, long after the builders of the pyramids; she was, moreover, a Thracian, the slave of Iadmon of Samos and fellow slave of Aesop.

Strabo, the Greek geographer and historian, describes the pyramid in his Geography (written between 20 BC and AD 23). Though smaller than those of Khufu and Khafre, he asserts, it was far more expensive to build, because from the base to about mid-height only the black stone used also in mortars was employed, brought from mountains at the far end of Ethiopia and greatly increasing labour costs through its extreme hardness. He too records the tradition that the pyramid was the tomb of a famous courtesan, built at the expense of her lovers: Doricha, whom Sappho presents as the mistress of her brother Charaxos, a wine merchant of Lesbos trading at Naucratis, and whom some authors call Rhodopis. Pliny the Elder briefly repeats this legend in his Natural History (published around AD 77).

According to a medieval Arabic tradition, Sultan al-Malik al-'Aziz was persuaded by a "stranger" that a treasure lay beneath the pyramid of Menkaure and resolved to raze it entirely; a month of relentless work detached only a few blocks, and with the treasury empty he concluded that the land-tax revenues of an entire year would not cover the cost of demolishing a single tier of the building, whereupon the project was abandoned for lack of means. Al-Maqrizi, in his history of Egypt (fifteenth century), adds that the sovereign, in the month of Dhu al-Hijjah of AH 592 (November 1196), ordered the pyramids demolished and their stones transported to Damietta to build walls there; learning of the enormous difficulties the enterprise entailed, he renounced razing the two great pyramids and contented himself with the smallest, which was built of hard granite.

== Exploration history ==
The site was visited and explored in 1835 by Giovanni Battista Caviglia, John Shae Perring and Richard William Howard Vyse. Caviglia and Vyse, searching like the medieval workmen for the entrance, followed the same reasoning and the same path: they sank a deep shaft into the core of the masonry in the hope of uncovering the internal chambers, without result, Caviglia going so far as to blast away the lowest courses of the monument and tunnel into it. Vyse finally located the true entrance in 1837 and explored the internal chambers, discovering the king's sarcophagi (cf. above). William Matthew Flinders Petrie explored the site in 1880. George Andrew Reisner began the excavation of the complex in 1906, continuing until 1924 and bringing to light the statues of Menkaure. The site was later surveyed, and the plans of the mortuary and valley temples recorded, by Vito Maragioglio and Celeste Rinaldi. Excavations resumed in 1988 under Mark Lehner, leading in 2000 to the discovery of the pyramid town southeast of Menkaure's valley temple.

== See also ==
- Egyptian pyramid construction techniques
- List of Egyptian pyramids
- List of megalithic sites

== Sources ==
- Adam, Jean-Pierre; Ziegler, Christiane (1999). Les pyramides d'Égypte [The Pyramids of Egypt] (in French). Paris: Hachette.
- Badawy, Alexander (1954). A History of Egyptian Architecture. Vol. I: From the Earliest Times to the End of the Old Kingdom. Cairo: published by the author.
- Brier, Bob; Hobbs, A. Hoyt (1999). Daily Life of the Ancient Egyptians. Greenwood Press.
- Capart, Jean; Werbrouck, Marcelle (1930). Memphis, à l'ombre des pyramides [Memphis, in the Shadow of the Pyramids] (in French). Brussels: Vromant.
- Edwards, I. E. S. (1986) [1947]. The Pyramids of Egypt. Penguin Books. ISBN 978-0140225495.
- Fiechter, Jean-Jacques (2001). Mykérinos, le dieu englouti [Menkaure, the Drowned God] (in French). Paris: Maisonneuve & Larose.
- Jenkins, Nancy (1980). The Boat Beneath the Pyramid. London: Thames and Hudson. ISBN 9780030570612.
- Lehner, Mark (1997). The Complete Pyramids: Solving the Ancient Mysteries. London: Thames & Hudson. ISBN 0-500-05084-8.
- Maragioglio, Vito; Rinaldi, Celeste (1967). L'architettura delle piramidi menfite [The Architecture of the Memphite Pyramids] (in Italian). Vol. VI: La Grande Fossa di Zauiet el-Aryan, la Piramide di Micerino, il Mastabat Faraun, la Tomba di Khentkaus. Rapallo: Officine Grafiche Canessa.
- Reisner, George A. (1931). Mycerinus: The Temples of the Third Pyramid at Giza. Cambridge, MA: Harvard University Press – via Giza Archives Project, Museum of Fine Arts, Boston.
- Reisner, George Andrew (1942). A History of the Giza Necropolis. Vol. III. Harvard University. (Note: This is the second unpublished follow-up to Reisner's work A History of the Giza Necropolis Vol. I, published by Harvard University Press)
- Stewart, Desmond (June 1, 1971). The Pyramids and Sphinx. Wonders of Man Series. Newsweek. ISBN 978-0276000164.
- Verner, Miroslav (2001). The Pyramids: The Mystery, Culture and Science of Egypt's Great Monuments. New York: Grove Press. ISBN 978-0-8021-1703-8.
- Verner, Miroslav (2007). The Pyramids: The Mystery, Culture, and Science of Egypt's Great Monuments. New York City, NY: Grove Atlantic. ISBN 9780802198631.
- Anderson, Sonja (20 February 2024). "Egypt Halts Controversial Plans to Renovate Ancient Pyramid". Smithsonian.
- "Egypt to reinstall outer casing of Pyramid of Menkaure". Egypt Independent. 27 January 2024.
- "Egypt orders review of pyramid restoration after video sparks public outrage". France 24. Agence France-Presse. 3 February 2024.
- Shawkat, Ahmed (30 January 2024). "Archaeologists in Egypt Embark on a Mission to Reconstruct the Outside of Giza's Smallest Pyramid". CBS News.
- State Information Service (16 February 2024). "Review Committee Rejects Restoring Casing Blocks to Menkaure Pyramid of Giza". Egypt State Information Service.

Classical sources

- Herodotus. "Book II (Euterpe)". Histories (in French). Translated by Pierre-Henri Larcher.
- Strabo. "Book XVII, part 1". Geography (in French). Translated by Amédée Tardieu.
- Pliny the Elder. "Book XXXVI". Natural History (in French). Translated by Émile Littré.

Comparison of approximate profiles of the Pyramid of Menkaure with some notable pyramidal or near-pyramidal buildings. Dotted lines indicate original heights, where data is available. In its SVG file, hover over a pyramid to highlight and click for its article.

tra
