= Pyramid G3-b =

Pyramid in the Giza Necropolis

G3-b
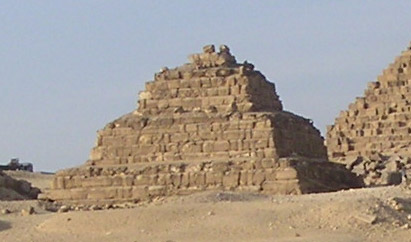
- Pyramid G3-b, looking northwest
- Interactive map of G3-b
- 29°58′18″N 31°07′40″E
- Constructed: c. 2510 BC
- Base: 31.24 meters

G3-b (also G3b, G3 b, GIIIb) is one of the three satellite pyramids of the larger Pyramid of Menkaure, located at the Giza pyramid complex. Situated south of the main pyramid between satellites G3-a and G3-c, this structure contained the body of a woman.

The pyramid was built during the Fourth Dynasty of Egypt, presumably for one of the wives of Menkaure. The American archaeologist George Andrew Reisner has speculated that the queen buried in the pyramid may have been Menkaure's half-sister, Shepsetkau, the daughter of Meresankh III and Khafre. The surface of the pyramid is stepped, consisting of four platforms that decrease toward the top. The pyramid's base is 31.24 metres (102.5 ft) square.

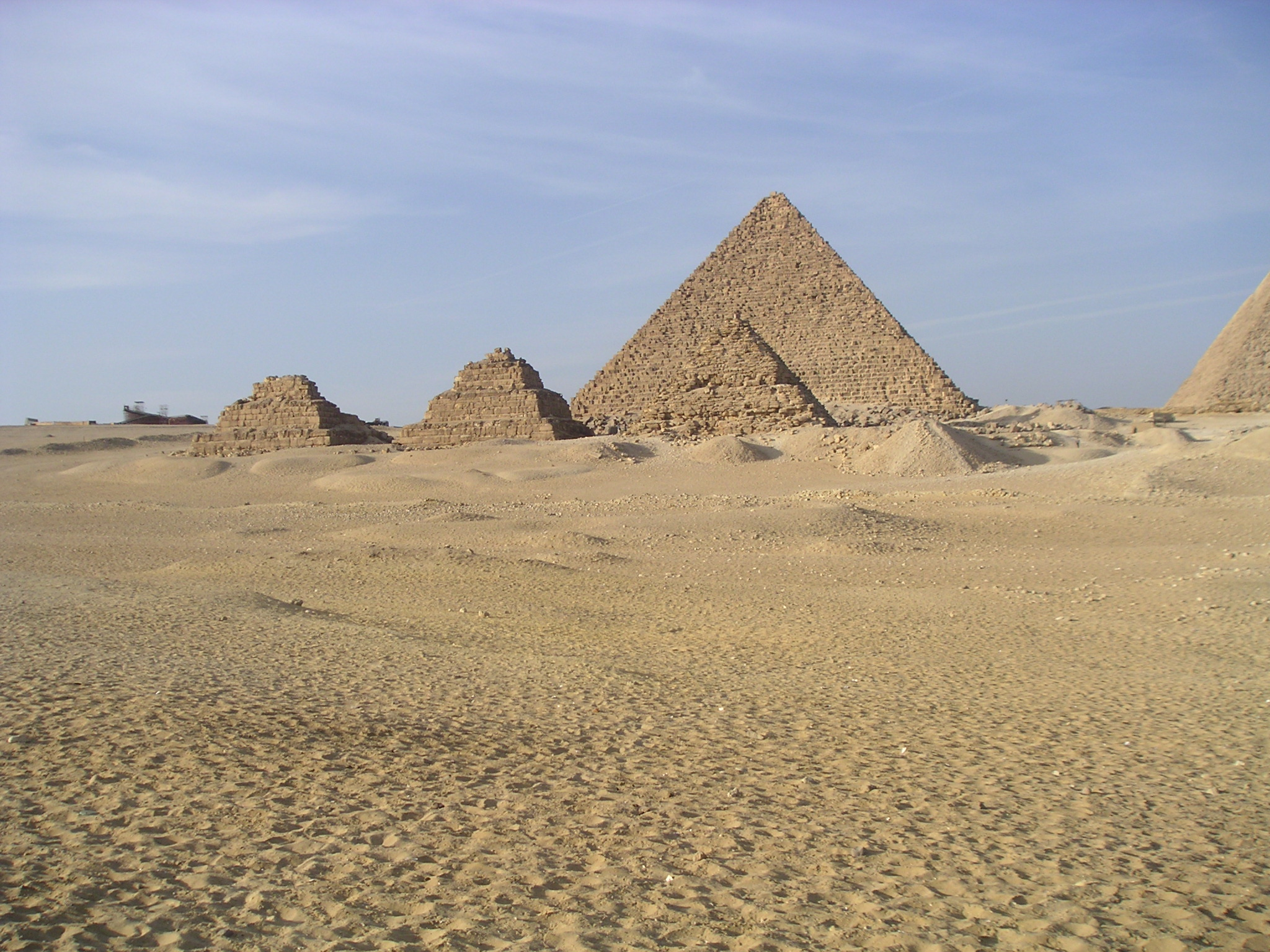
The pyramid-companions, with the Pyramid of Menkaure in the background. Pyramid G3-b is the middle of the three smaller pyramids.

== See also ==
- List of Egyptian pyramids
- Pyramid G3-a
- Pyramid G3-c

== Bibliography ==
- Lehner, Mark (1997). The Complete Pyramids: Solving the Ancient Mysteries. London, UK: Thames & Hudson. ISBN 9780500050842.
- Reisner, George Andrew (1942). A History of the Giza Necropolis. Vol. III. Harvard University. (Note: This is the second unpublished follow-up to Reisner's work A History of the Giza Necropolis Vol. I, published by Harvard University Press)
- Verner, Miroslav (2007). The Pyramids: The Mystery, Culture, and Science of Egypt's Great Monuments. New York City, NY: Grove Atlantic. ISBN 9780802198631.
