= Pyramid G3-a =

One of the 3 pyramids near the pyramid of Menkaure

G3-a
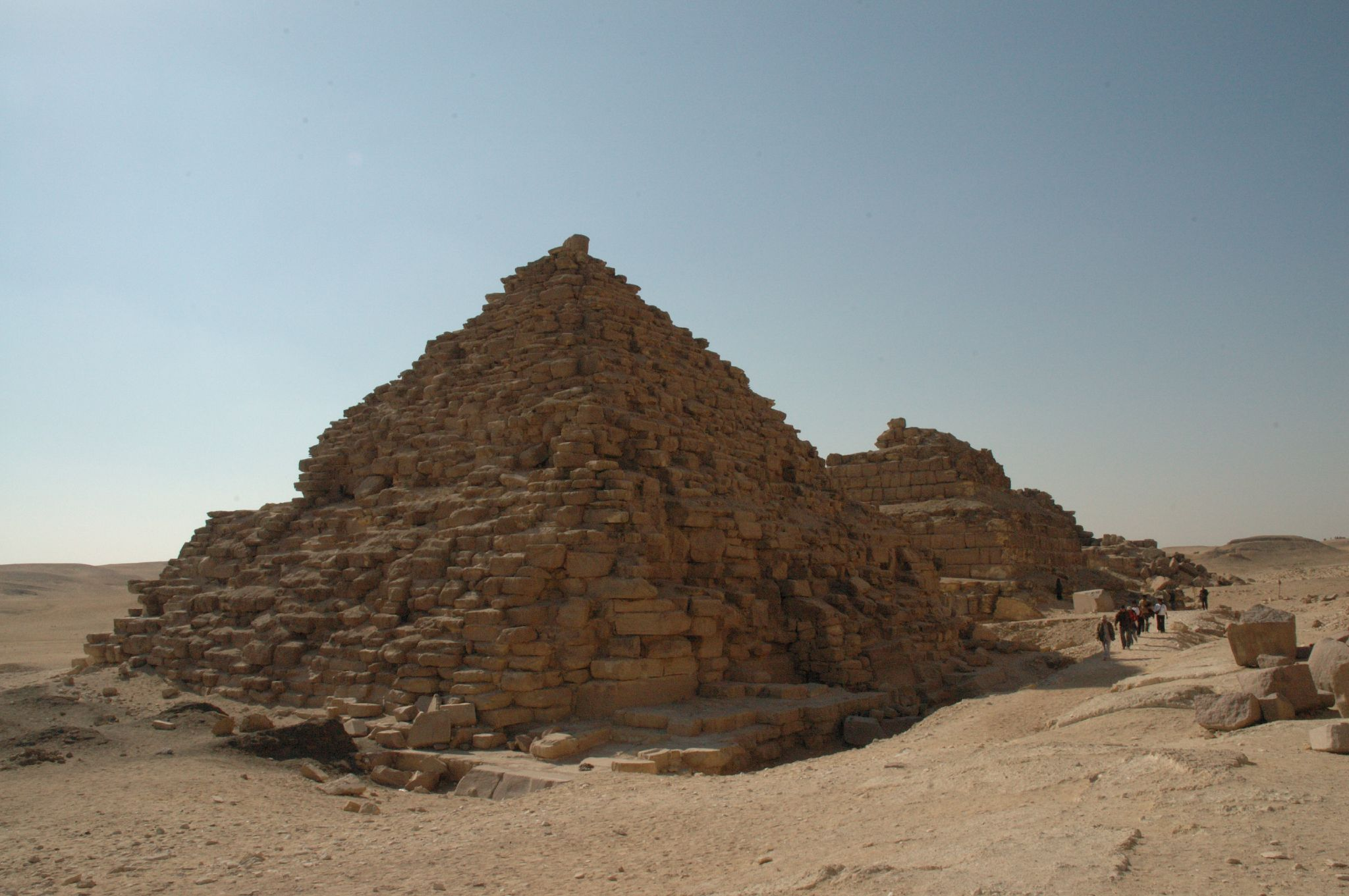
- Pyramid G3-a, looking southwest
- Interactive map of G3-a
- 29°58′18″N 31°07′42″E
- Constructed: c. 2510 BC (4th dynasty)
- Type: True Pyramid
- Height: 28.4 meters (original)
- Base: 44 meters (original)

G3-a (also G3a, G3 c, GIIIa) is one of the three satellite pyramids of the larger Pyramid of Menkaure, located at the Giza pyramid complex. This structure is situated south of the main pyramid and is the easternmost of the three satellites. The pyramid was built during the Fourth Dynasty of Egypt, presumably for one of the wives of Menkaure. Egyptologist George Andrew Reisner was "confident" that the structure housed Khamerernebty II, but this is far from certain.

It is a true pyramid, with a base that is 44 metres (144 ft) square; its original height was 28.4 metres (93 ft). The structure has a T-shaped chamber carved out of the bedrock, to which an entrance opens on the north face of the structure. Egyptologist Mark Lehner argues that this is akin to the layout of a satellite or ka pyramid. The fact that the structure once contained a pink granite sarcophagus, however, has led scholars to speculate that it may have been reused as a queen's burial tomb, or that it served as a chapel where the body of Menkaure was mummified.

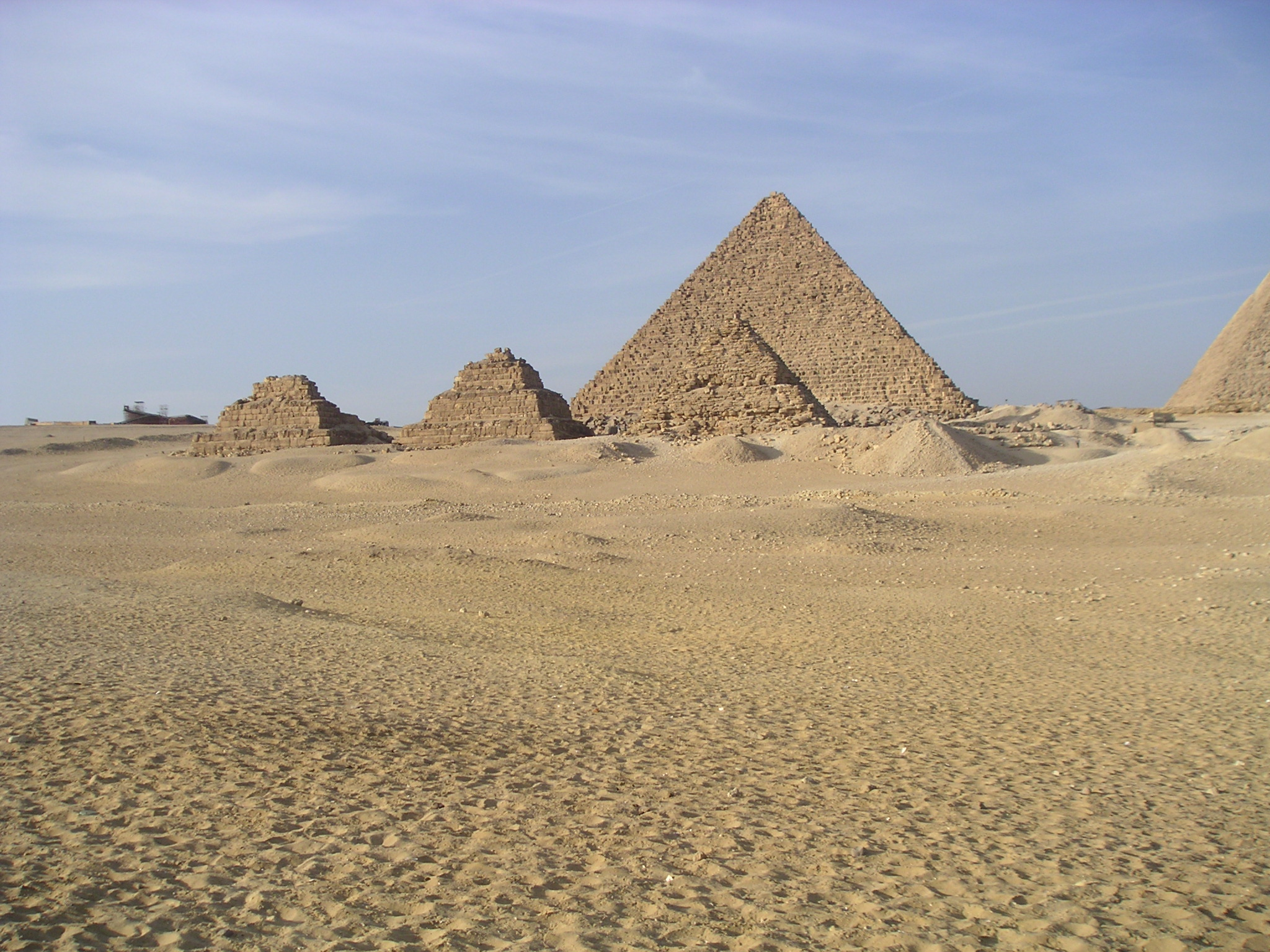
The pyramid-companions, with the Pyramid of Menkaure in the background. Pyramid G3-a is the rightmost of the three small pyramids.

== See also ==
- List of Egyptian pyramids
- Pyramid G3-b
- Pyramid G3-c

== Bibliography ==
- Dodson, Aidan; Hilton, Dyan (2004). The Complete Royal Families of Ancient Egypt. London: Thames & Hudson. ISBN 0-500-05128-3.
- Lehner, Mark (1997). The Complete Pyramids: Solving the Ancient Mysteries. London, UK: Thames & Hudson. ISBN 9780500050842.
- Reisner, George Andrew (1942). A History of the Giza Necropolis. Vol. III. Harvard University. (Note: This is the second unpublished follow-up to Reisner's work A History of the Giza Necropolis Vol. I, published by Harvard University Press)
- Verner, Miroslav (2007). The Pyramids: The Mystery, Culture, and Science of Egypt's Great Monuments. New York City, NY: Grove Atlantic. ISBN 9780802198631.
