= List of ancient Egyptian statuary with amulet necklaces =

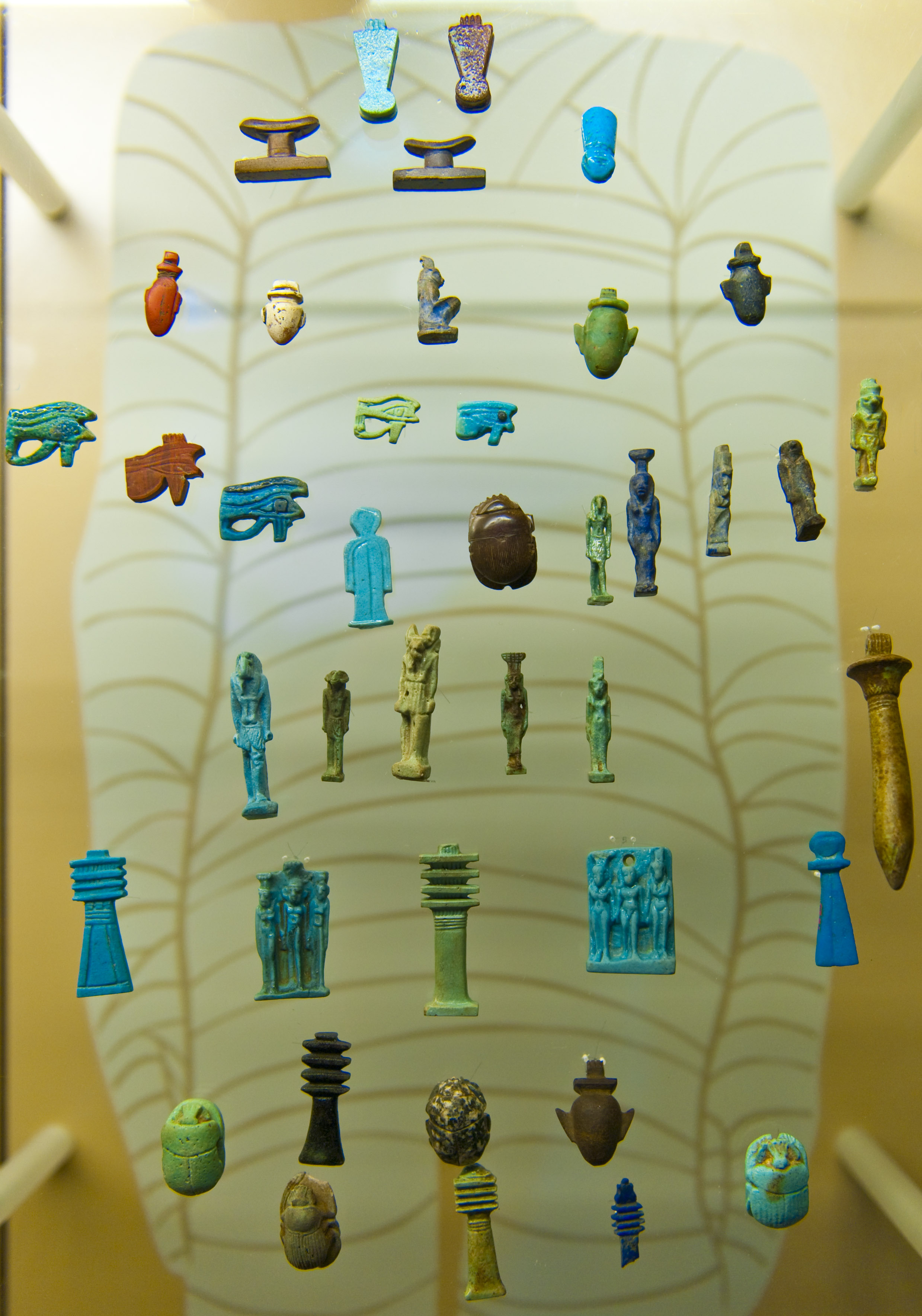
Collection of amulets, Senckenberg, Naturmuseum, Frankfurt, Germany. Suspension hole on 3-god plaque, lug-holes on: papyrus stem, Menats-(counterpoise)(?), large heart(?)(bottom-right) (Photo: High-Res expandible). Row 3: (4)-Heart amulets.

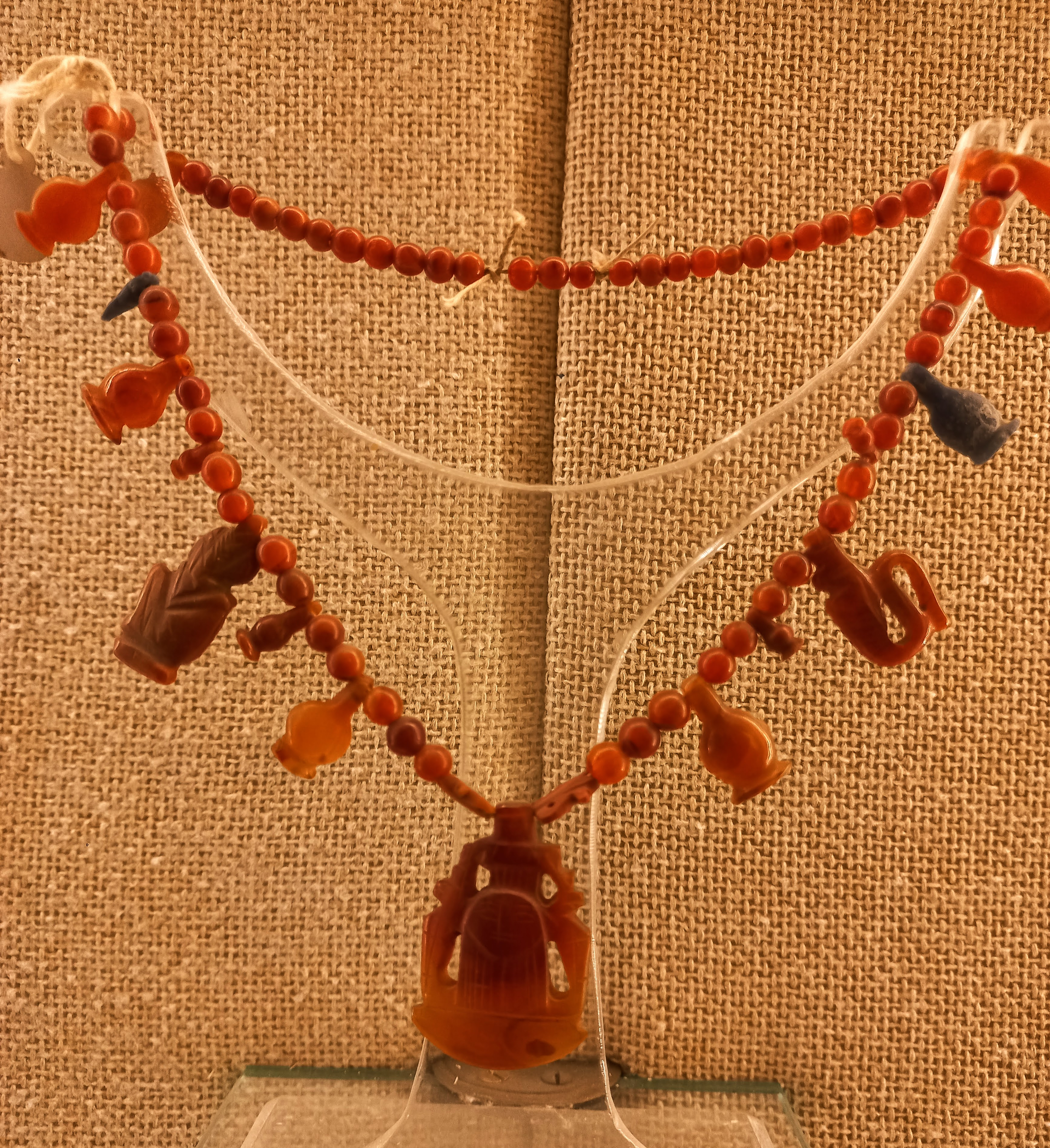
Ancient Amulet Necklace of Egypt, Albert hall Museum, Jaipur

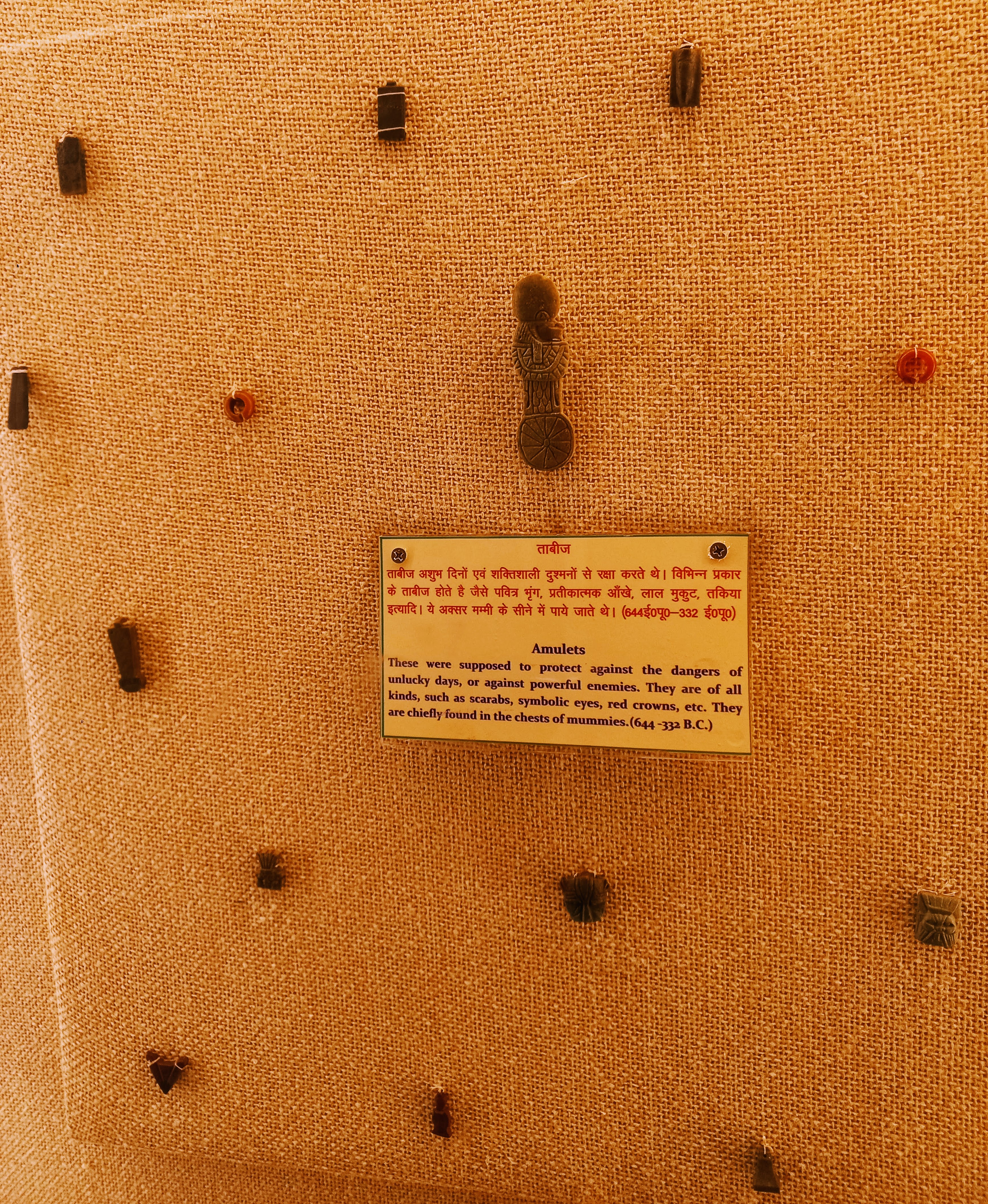
Amulets of Egypt, 644-332 BC, Albert Hall Museum, Jaipur. Egyptian Gallery.

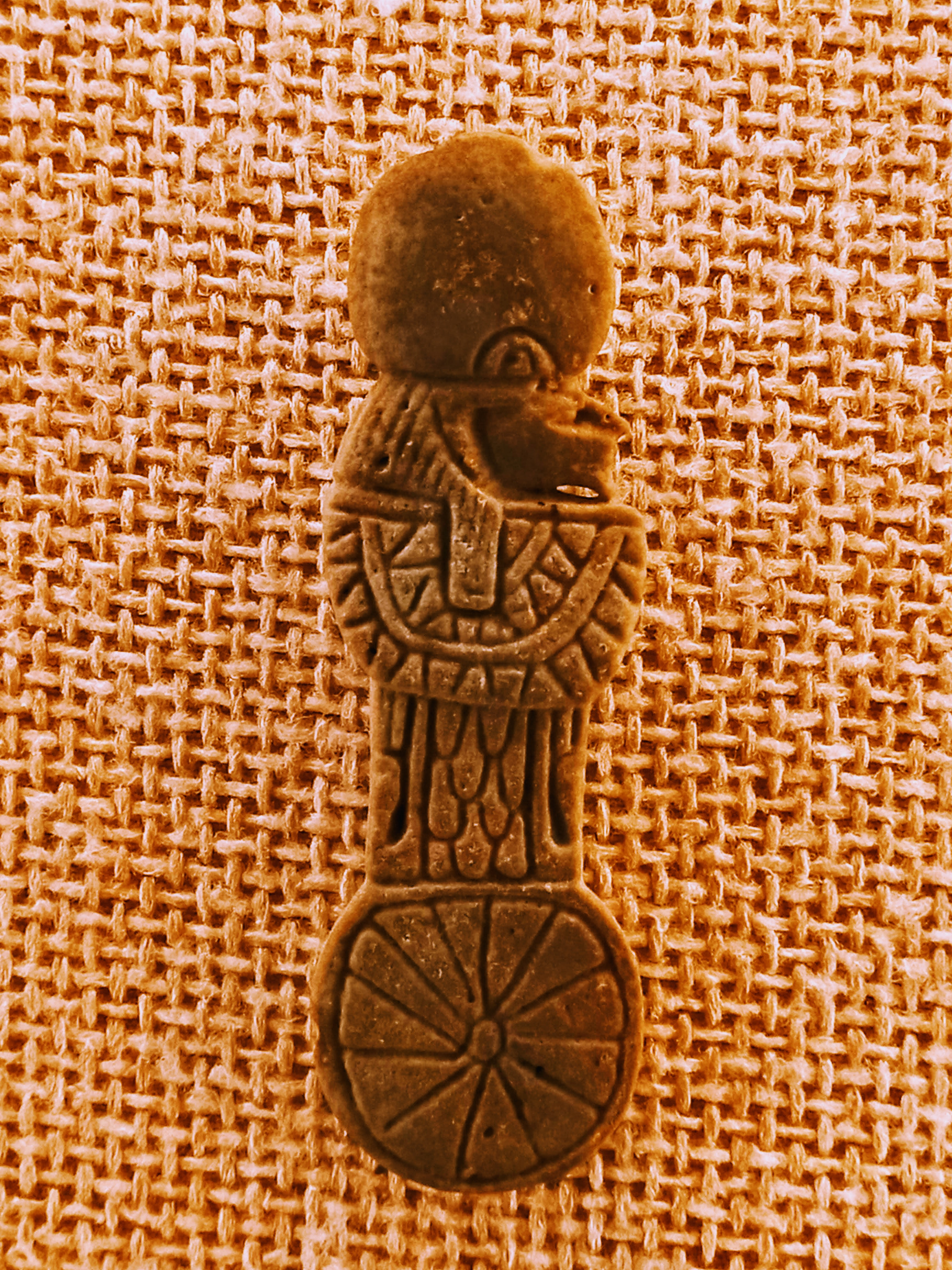
Amulet of Egypt, Ancient, Albert Hall Museum, Jaipur

An amulet, also known as a good luck charm, is an object believed to confer protection upon its possessor. The "Amulets of Ancient Egypt" fall in approximately seven major categories:

1. Amulets of gods/goddesses and sacred animals
2. Amulets of protection (or aversion)
3. The scarab for the living, (or for a funerary offering)
4. Amulets of assimilation
5. Amulets for powers
6. Amulets of possessions, property, or as offerings
7. (symbolism of materials)

The first usages are from time periods of: ED, Early Dynastic Period, FIP, First Intermediate Period, G-R, Graeco-Roman Period, LD, Late Dynastic Period, MK, Middle Kingdom, NK, New Kingdom, OK, Old Kingdom, SIP, Second Intermediate Period, and TIP, Third Intermediate Period.

Amulet	Egy. lang. equiv	Discovered by	Usage-or- Origin	City/ cemetery	Notes
Papyrus stem (hieroglyph) (scarab at left)	udjt utchat		5th Dynasty	Mastaba	One of the 14 Spirits of Ra-(no 5); meanings of youth, viguor
Girdle of Isis/Knot of Isis; Tyet (and Djed Pillar)	tyt	Flinders Petrie	5th Dynasty	Mastaba	

== Amulets of protection ==
Amulets of protection: animals, gods, goddesses, etc.

=== Ankh Amulet ===
 S34

(seated)-block statue of: Cuboid Statue of Tety called Tetyty, (photo), British Museum

Amulet	Egyptian. lang. equiv	Discovered by	Usage-or- Origin	City/ cemetery	Notes
Ankh-Amulet on necklace	'n(kh)	British Museum, acquired by E. A. Wallis Budge	1475BC	Karnak-(?)	protection, or honorary amulet part of hieroglyph-statement-theme: an(kh)-hot(e)p (+ on right and left hands: symbols of Upper and Lower Egypt + Sun + Moon); modern meaning: Enjoy: Life & Peace, everywhere the Sun and Moon is present, (all of Egypt) see wikicommons: Block statues of Egypt

=== Bes Amulet ===
 D2

(shiny boxwood statuette) Young Girl, (shaved head with youth side lock), Carrying oversized Pot The Durham Servant Girl, (photo, Durham Museum)

Amulet	Egy. lang. equiv	Discovered by	Usage-or- Origin	City/ cemetery	Notes
medium-sized Bes Amulet on necklace		Durham University Museum acquired after 1816, by Lord Algernon Percy	(reign of Amenhotep III)	from pit, near TT52 owned by First Prophet of Amun, MeryPtah	protection, or honorary amulet (no photo, at present) for God of Children, or Youth boxwood, small cosmetic container-(in non-standard/expressionist style)

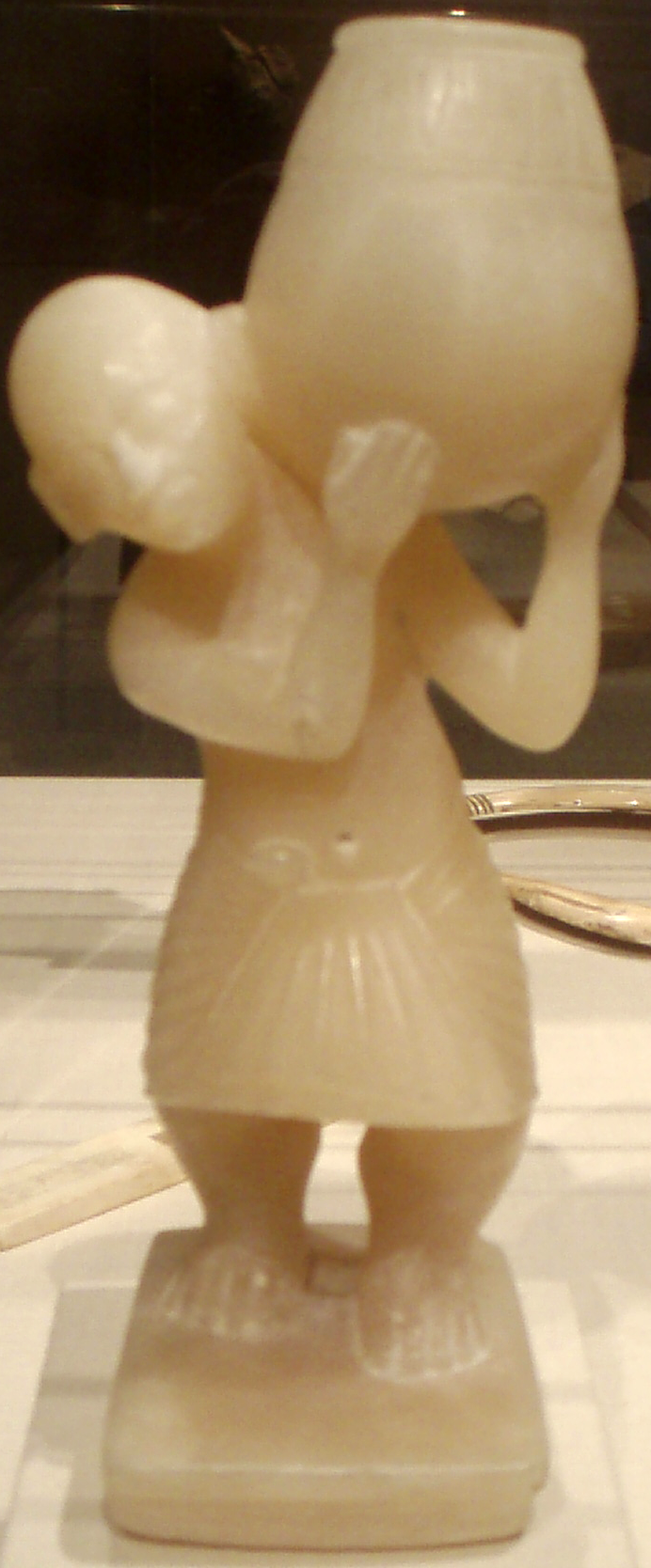
Motif:
(non-formal Egyptian style): Dwarf /(Child) Carrying Oversized Container
Amarna Period, reign of Akhenaten, 1353-1336 BC

=== Eye of Horus Amulet ===
 D10

Gayer-Anderson cat, (donated to British Museum)

Amulet	Egy. lang. equiv	Discovered by	Usage-or- Origin	City/ cemetery	Notes
Plaque-Necklace as Eye-of-Horus Amulet				(Late Period of Egypt)	cat, as cat-Goddess Bastet British Museum

=== Eye of Horus Amulet, Thoth-Baboon statues ===
 D10

Thoth-as Baboon, (Louvre)

Amulet	Egy. lang. equiv	Discovered by	Usage-or- Origin	City/ cemetery	Notes
Plaque-Necklace as Eye-of-Horus Amulet					baboon, as god-Thoth Louvre (no. E17496)

Other types of plaque-necklaces on Thoth-baboon:

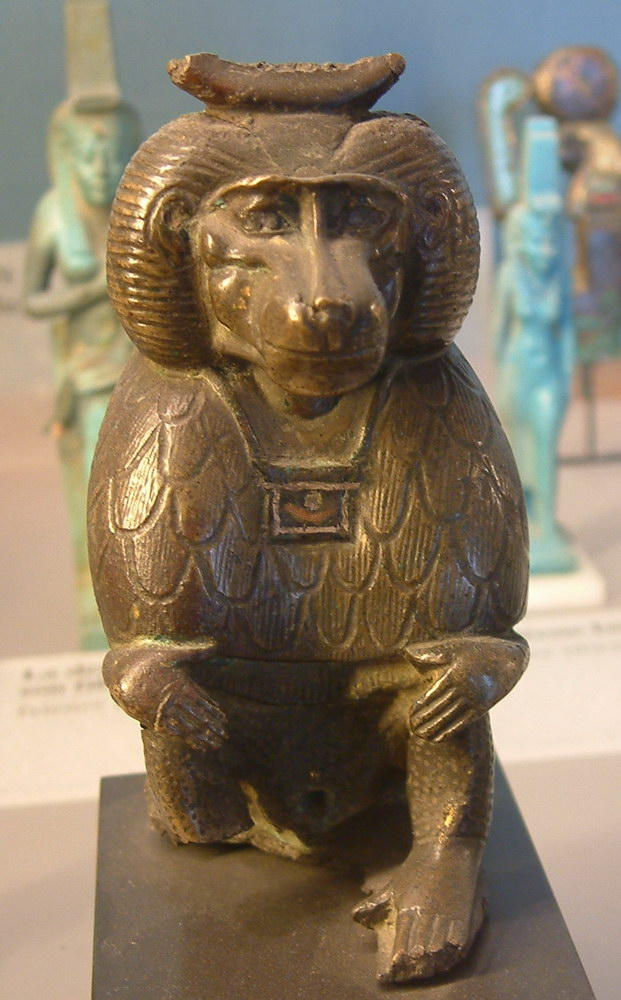
statue at Louvre with plaque-amulet necklace

=== 3-Fox-Skins ===
 F31

vertical Painted Relief Panel of Iry, Scribe, ((correct vertical)-Painted Panel Relief of Iry. )

Amulet	Egy. lang. equiv	Discovered by	Usage-or- Origin	City/ cemetery	Notes
3-fox skins on necklace	ms, "born of" examples: Pharaoh Ahmose: "Moon-Born", or: Kamose, "Spirit-Born"		4th Dynasty (2613–2589 BC)	Iry's Tomb, Saqqara	protection(?), or honorary amulet(?) --- (Actual Photo of Iry's Panel, see British Museum page) (photo shown of similar vertical panel, same period of hieroglyphs: wood panel of Hesy-Ra)

=== Fringed-Fabric ligatured w/ vertical S-(folded cloth) ===
 S28 s

Amulet	Egy. lang. equiv	Discovered by	Usage-or- Origin	City/ cemetery	Notes
Fringed-Fabric with S folded cloth-Symbol on necklace			Narmer Palette, Predynastic Egypt or Old Kingdom	the palette is from Hierakonopolis	behind Pharaoh Narmer, attendant carrying "pair of sandals": his title from necklace: Steward of the Pharaoh's Wardrobe necklace of authority (see expanded version: Attendant of Pharaoh Narmer)

=== Heart amulet ===
 F34

Amulet	Egy. lang. equiv	Discovered by	Usage-or- Origin	City/ cemetery	Notes
Heart Amulet on necklace				TT55, tomb of Ramose (TT55), (in Theban Tomb 55)	Necklace with Heart-shaped amulet Central Figure, under 2-opposite-facing Water Libation vessels streaming Water-streams. Usekh collar, double-stranded necklace w/ large amulet laying upon the collar. Wikicommons, Tomb of Ramose

=== Pectoral Necklace ===
 S11 S17A

Amulet	Egy. lang. equiv	Discovered by	Usage-or- Origin	City/ cemetery	Notes
Pectoral on necklace				Louvre Museum	suspension loop -- (for necklace)

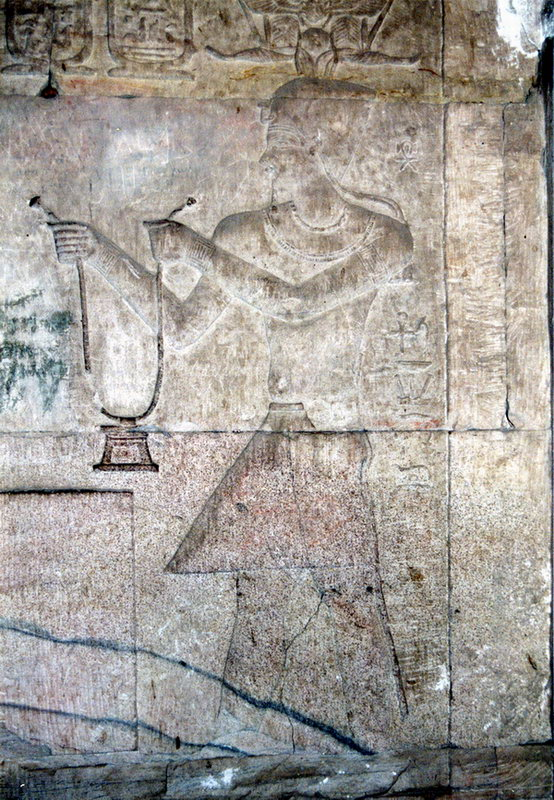
Offering of Pectoral Necklace

=== Unidentified amulet ===
 F31

(two statues) Prince Rahotep, and wife Nofret

Amulet	Egy. lang. equiv	Discovered by	Usage-or- Origin	City/ cemetery	Notes
possibly: 3-fox skins on necklace (for husband: Prince Rahotep-wife Nofret has a Usekh collar-type necklace)			4th Dynasty (2613–2589 BC)	the couple's Mastaba at Meidum	protection(?), or honorary amulet(?)

=== Amulet necklace statues of Senusret III ===
 O39 F29

– (created by Senusret III(?), or from Kush country(?))
Statues of Senusret III

Amulet	Egy. lang. equiv	Discovered by	Usage-or- Origin	City/ cemetery	Notes
pierced object amulet on necklace			12th Dynasty (ca 1850 BC) (post Kush campaigns(?))	Senusret III statue at British Museum	protection(?), or honorary amulet(?) found on multiple statues

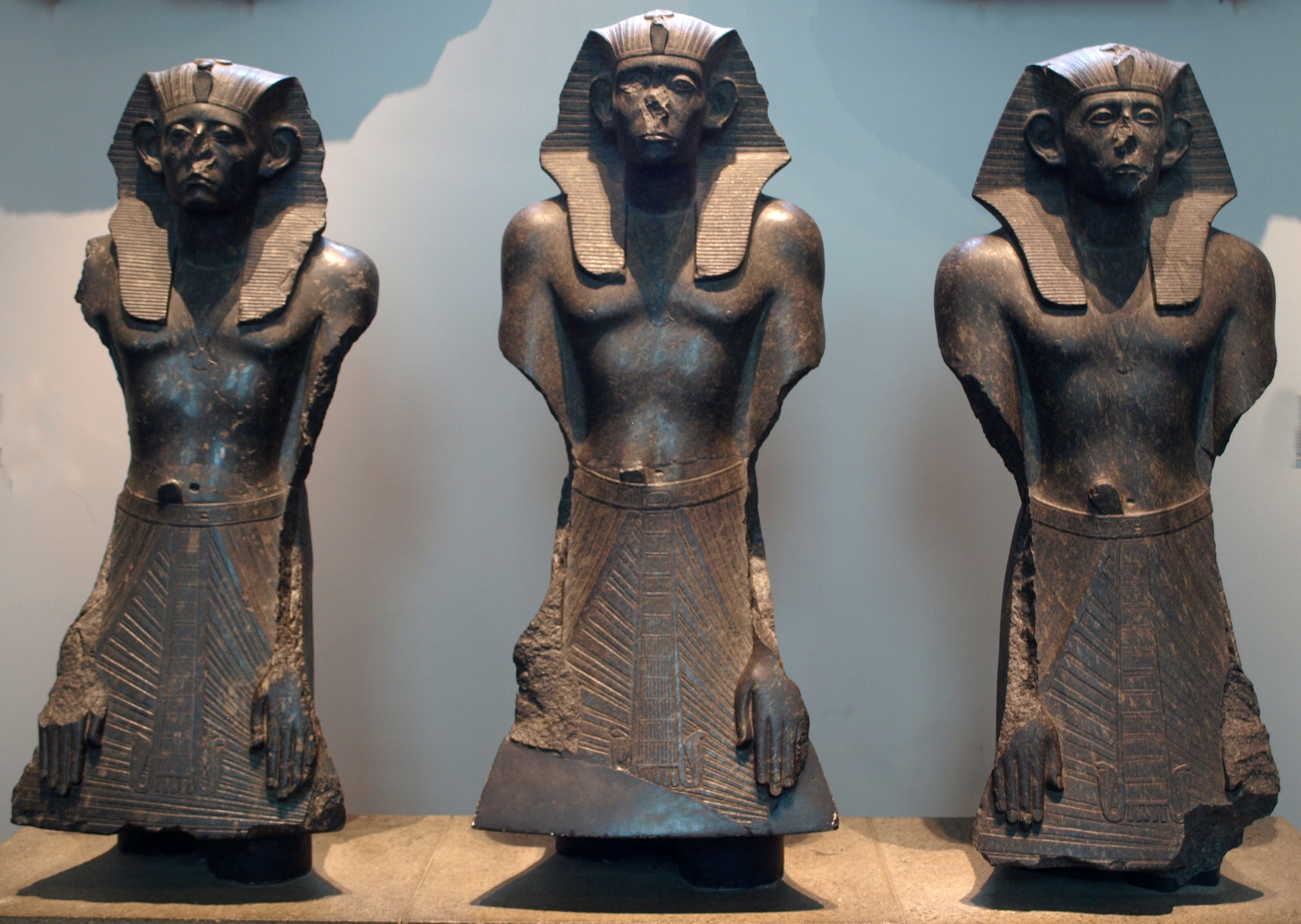
Amulet Necklace on 3-statues, British Museum

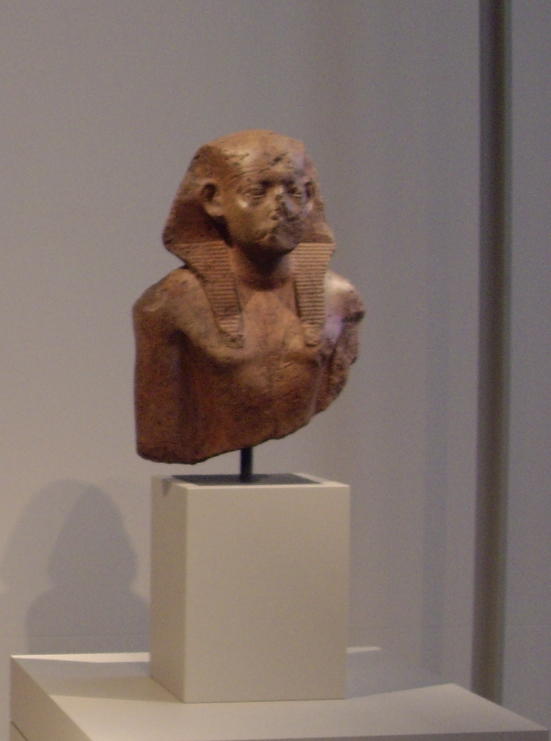
Berlin Museum statue

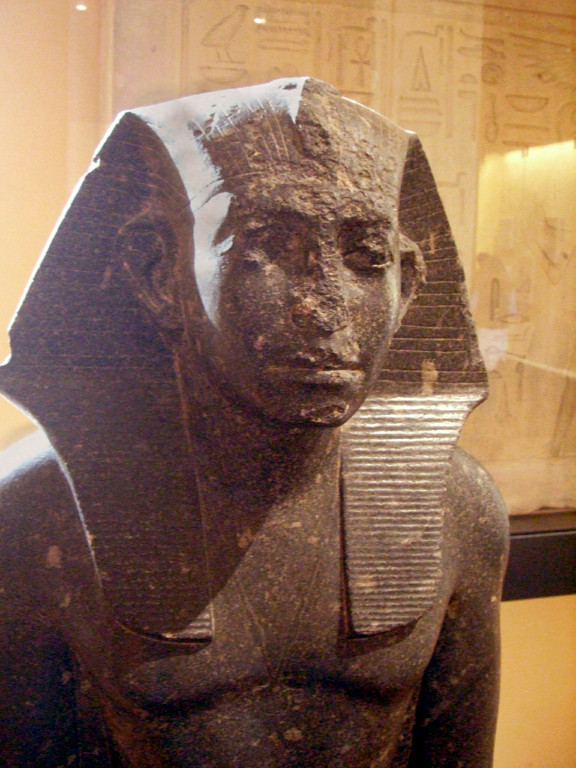
Louvre statue

== Amulets of assimilation ==
=== 2-Wine-Jars ===
 W21

(tomb relief) Maya (Egyptian) w/Staff and hieroglyph inscriptions–(Tomb of Maya)

Amulet	Egy. lang. equiv	Discovered by	Usage-or- Origin	City/ cemetery	Notes
2-Wine-Jars amulet on necklace	irp, 'wine' (Det.)	Geoffrey Martin; 1986- (Re-working of Saqqara tombs-newly discovered tomb)		Tomb of Maya Maya was Treasurer of Tutankhamun	Abundance (no photo link, at present) (see Pectoral (Ancient Egypt))
