= Old Kingdom of Egypt =

Period in ancient Egyptian history (c. 2686–2181 BC)

- c. 2686 BC–c. 2181 BC
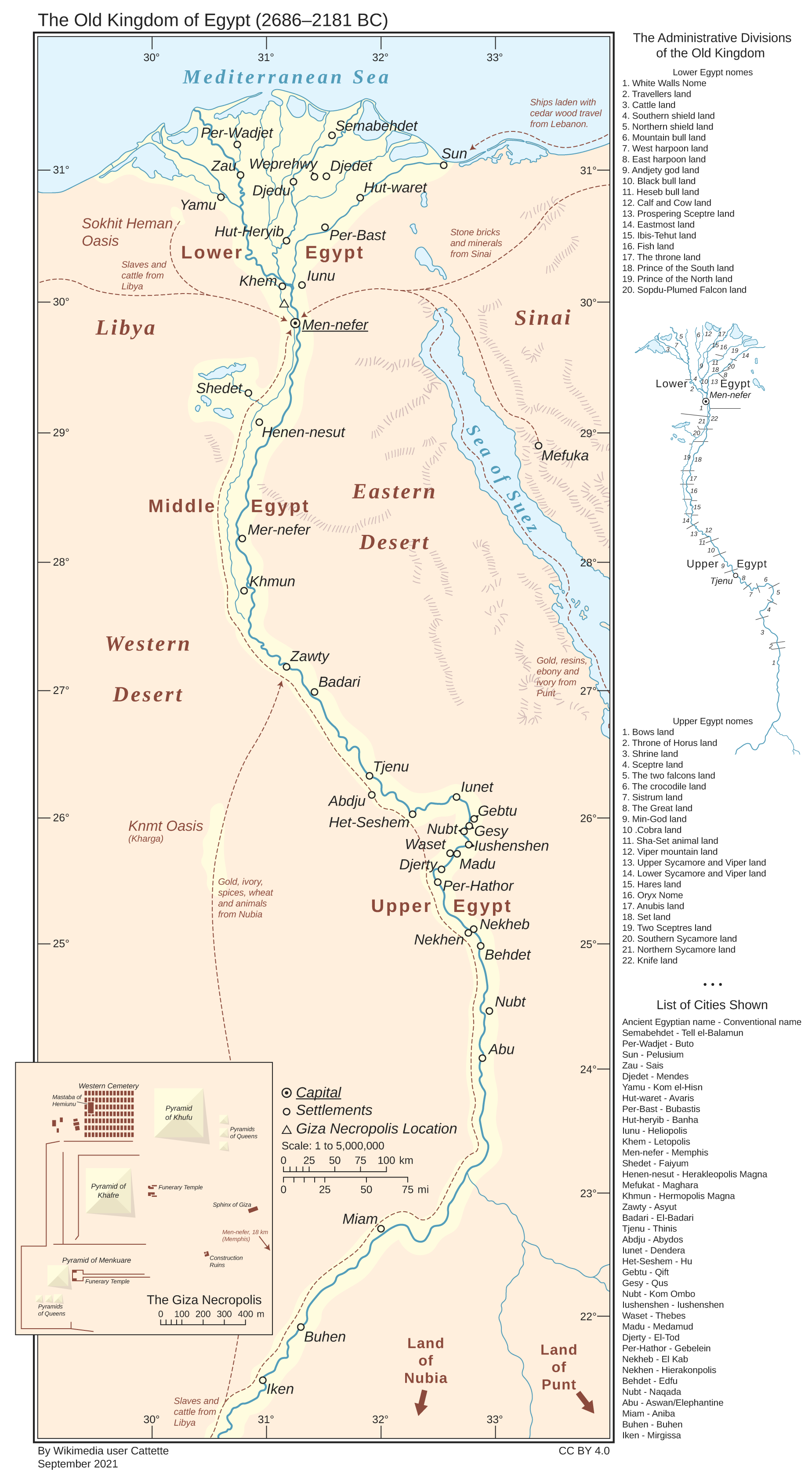
- During the Old Kingdom of Egypt (circa 2700 BC – circa 2200 BC), Egypt consisted of the Nile River region south to Abu (also known as Elephantine), as well as Sinai and the oases in the western desert, with Egyptian control/rule over Nubia reaching to the area north of the third cataract.
- Capital: Memphis
- Common languages: Ancient Egyptian
- Religion: Ancient Egyptian religion
- Government: Theocratic absolute monarchy
- Pharaoh
  - c. 2686 – c. 2649 BC: Djoser (first)
  - c. 2184 – c. 2181 BC: Last king depends on the scholar, Neitiqerty Siptah (6th Dynasty) or Neferirkare (7th/8th Dynasty)
- History
  - Began: c. 2686 BC
  - Ended: c. 2181 BC

Population
  - 2500 BC: 1.6 million
Preceded by	Succeeded by
Early Dynastic Period of Egypt	First Intermediate period

In ancient Egyptian history, the Old Kingdom is the period spanning c. 2700 – c. 2200 BC. It is also known as the "Age of the Pyramids" or the "Age of the Pyramid Builders", as it encompasses the reigns of the great pyramid-builders of the Fourth Dynasty, such as King Sneferu, under whom the art of pyramid-building was perfected, and the kings Khufu, Khafre and Menkaure, who commissioned the construction of the pyramids at Giza. Egypt attained its first sustained peak of civilization during the Old Kingdom, the first of three so-called "Kingdom" periods (followed by the Middle Kingdom and New Kingdom), which mark the high points of civilization in the lower Nile Valley.

The concept of an "Old Kingdom" as one of three "golden ages" was coined in 1845 by the German Egyptologist Baron von Bunsen, and its definition evolved significantly throughout the 19th and the 20th centuries. Not only was the last king of the Early Dynastic Period related to the first two kings of the Old Kingdom, but the "capital", the royal residence, remained at Ineb-Hedj, the Egyptian name for Memphis. The basic justification for separating the two periods is the revolutionary change in architecture accompanied by the effects on Egyptian society and the economy of large-scale building projects.

The Old Kingdom is most commonly regarded as the period from the Third Dynasty to the Sixth Dynasty (2686–2181 BC). Information from the Fourth to the Sixth Dynasties of Egypt is scarce, and historians regard the history of the era as literally "written in stone" and largely architectural in that it is through the monuments and their inscriptions that scholars have been able to construct a history. While the Old Kingdom was a period of internal security and prosperity, it was followed by a period of disunity and relative cultural decline referred to by Egyptologists as the First Intermediate Period, starting with the Seventh Dynasty. Some Egyptologists include both the Seventh and Eighth Dynasty as a continuation of the Old Kingdom, with the administration centralized at Memphis. During the Old Kingdom, the King of Egypt (not called the Pharaoh until the New Kingdom) became a living god who ruled absolutely and could demand the services and wealth of his subjects.

Under King Djoser, the first king of the Third Dynasty of the Old Kingdom, a new era of building was initiated at Saqqara. Djoser's architect, Imhotep, is credited with the development of building with stone and with the conception of the new architectural form, the step pyramid. The Old Kingdom is best known for a large number of pyramids constructed at this time as burial places for Egypt's kings.

== History ==
=== Rise of the Old Kingdom ===
The first King of the Old Kingdom was Djoser (sometime between 2691 and 2625 BC) of the Third Dynasty, who ordered the construction of a pyramid (the Step Pyramid) in Memphis' necropolis, Saqqara. An important person during the reign of Djoser was his vizier, Imhotep.

It was in this era that formerly independent ancient Egyptian states became known as nomes, under the rule of the king. The former rulers were forced to assume the role of governors or otherwise work in tax collection. Egyptians in this era believed the king to be the incarnation of Horus, linking the human and spiritual worlds. Egyptian views on the nature of time during this period held that the universe worked in cycles, and the Pharaoh on earth worked to ensure the stability of those cycles. They also perceived themselves as specially selected people.

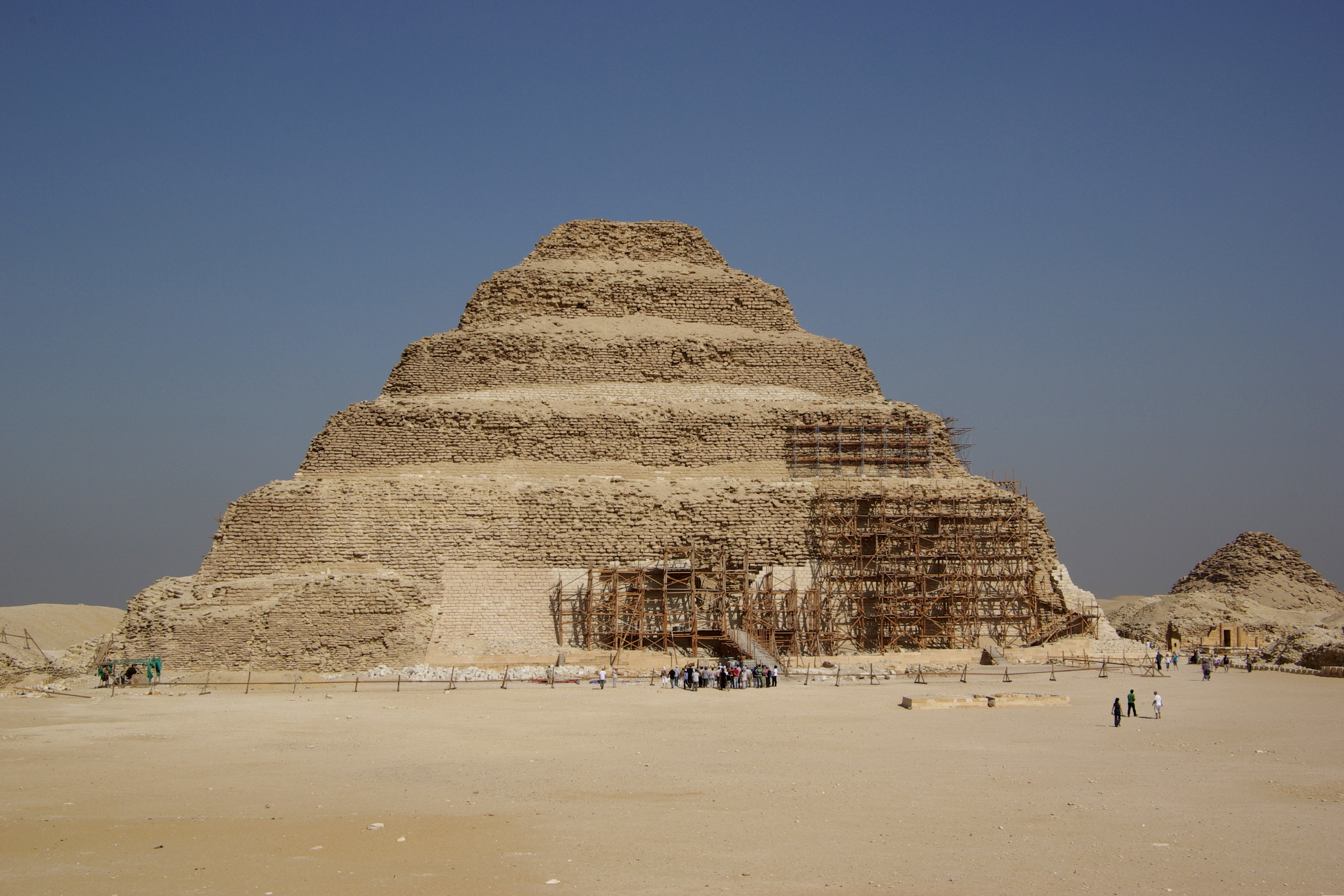
The Pyramid of Djoser at Saqqara.

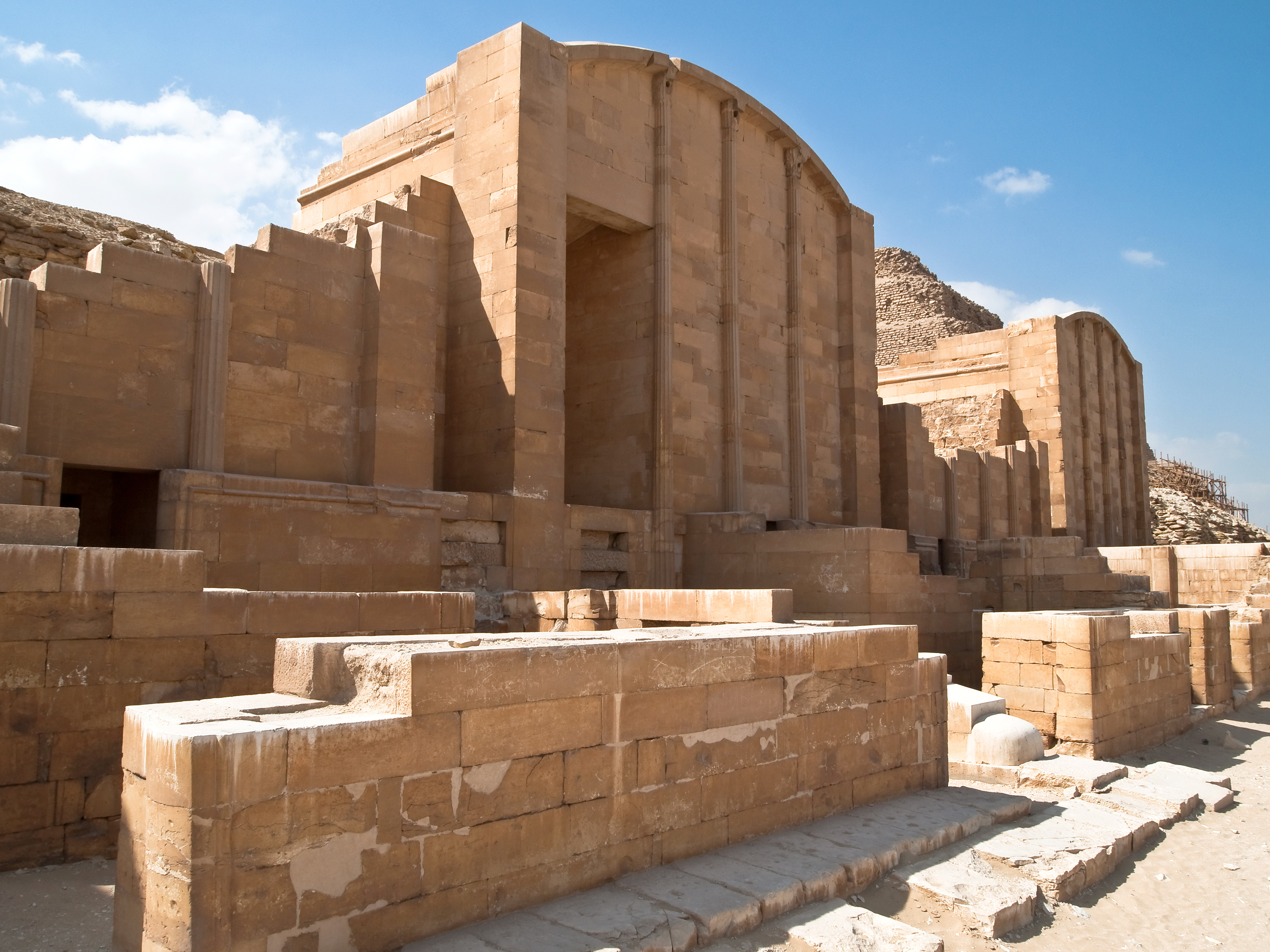
The Temple of Djoser at Saqqara

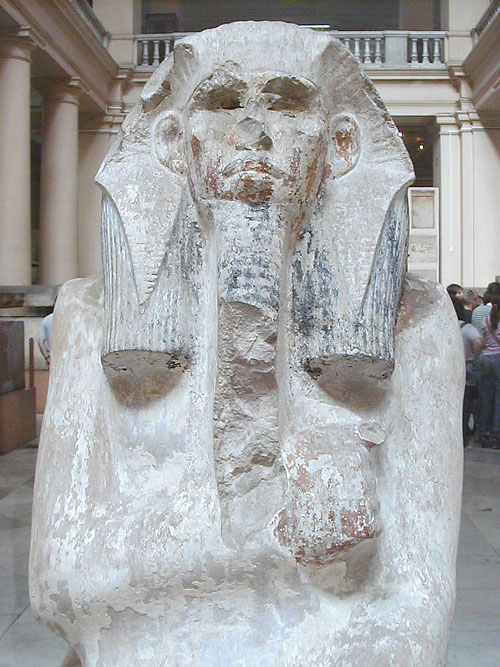
Limestone Ka statue of Djoser from his pyramid serdab at Saqqara, Egyptian Museum, Cairo

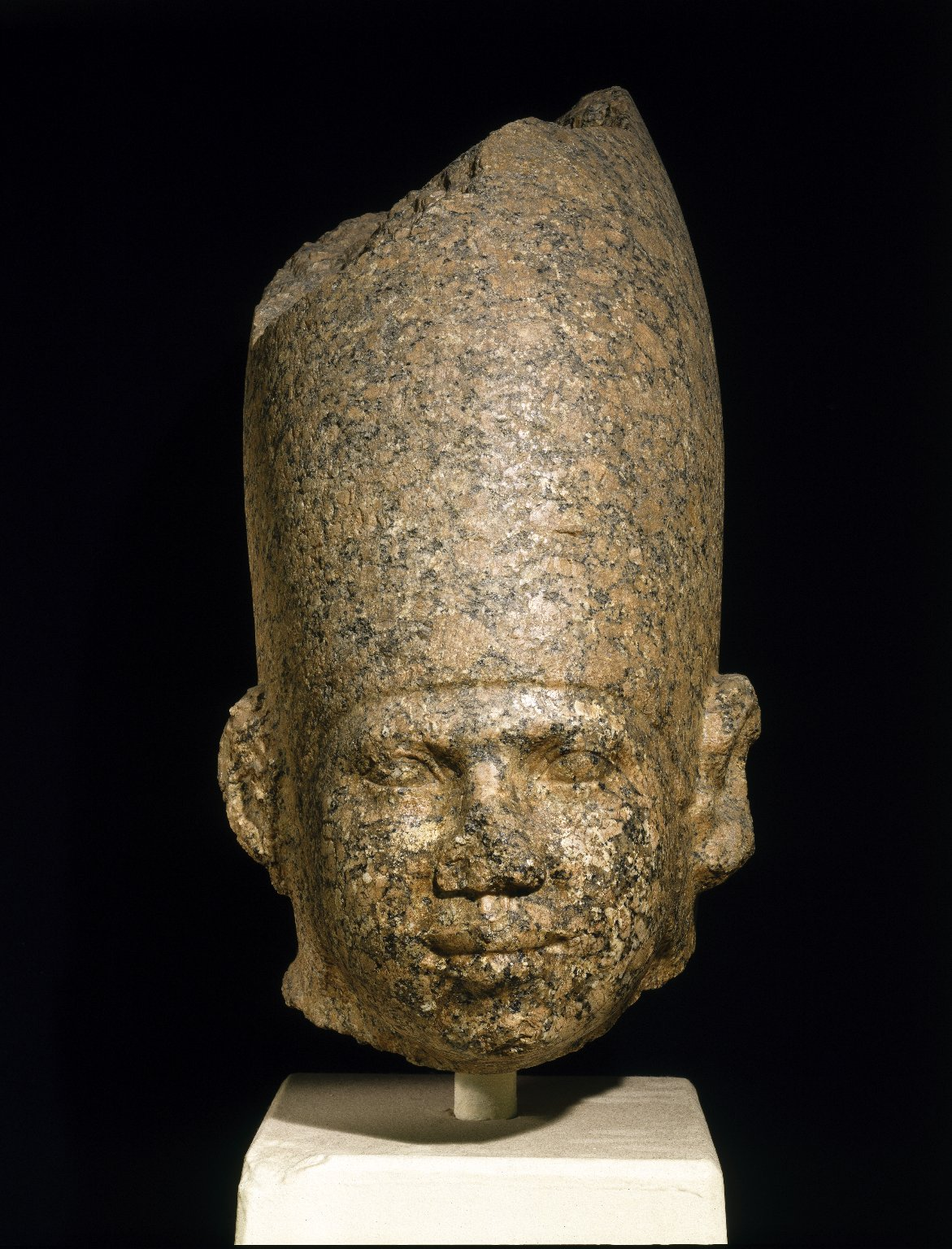
The head of a King, likely Huni c. 2650–2600 BC, Brooklyn Museum.

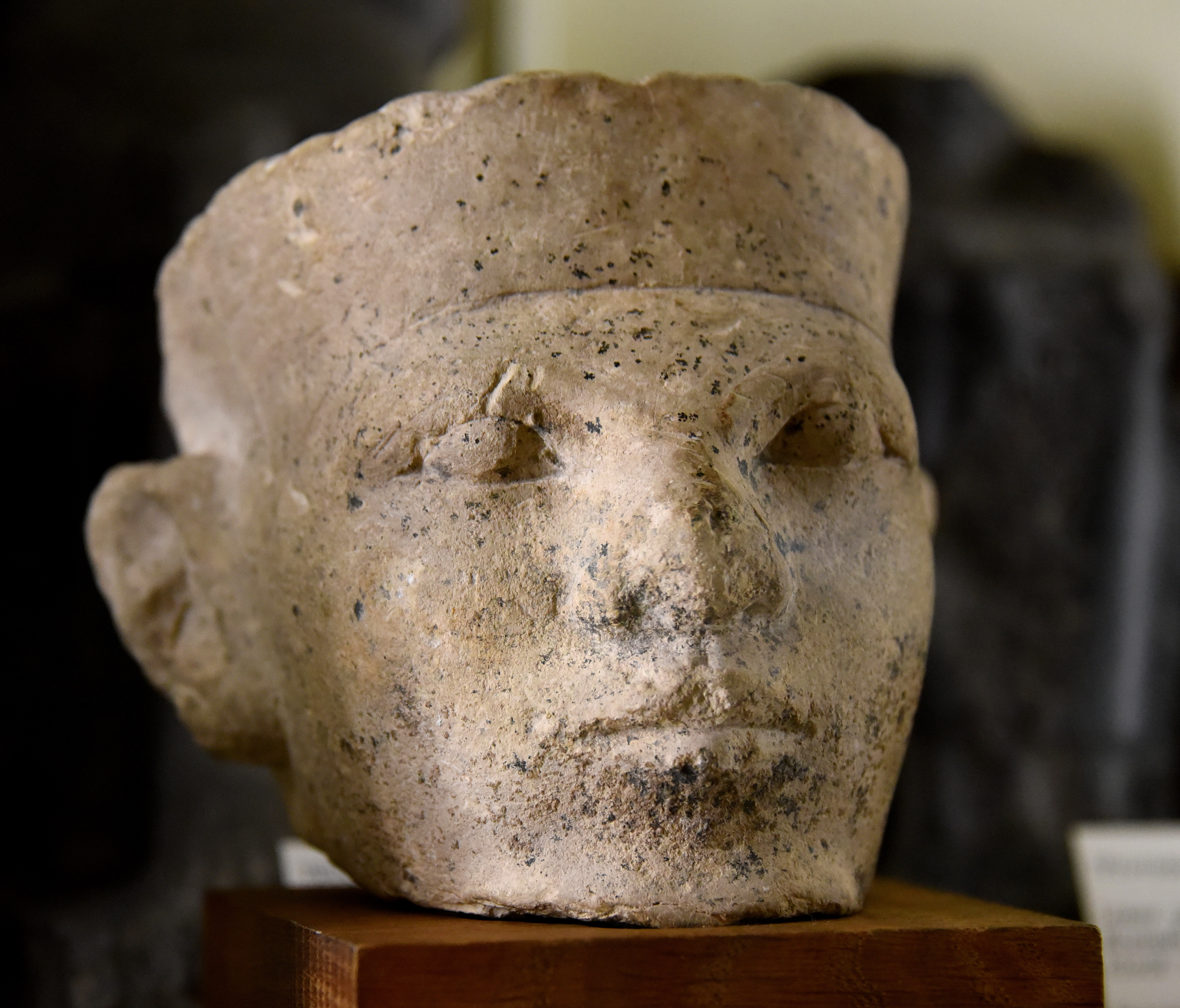
Limestone head of an early Egyptian king, The Petrie Museum. Modern scholars have considered the stone bust to depict an Early Dynastic or Old Kingdom pharaoh.

=== Height of the Old Kingdom ===
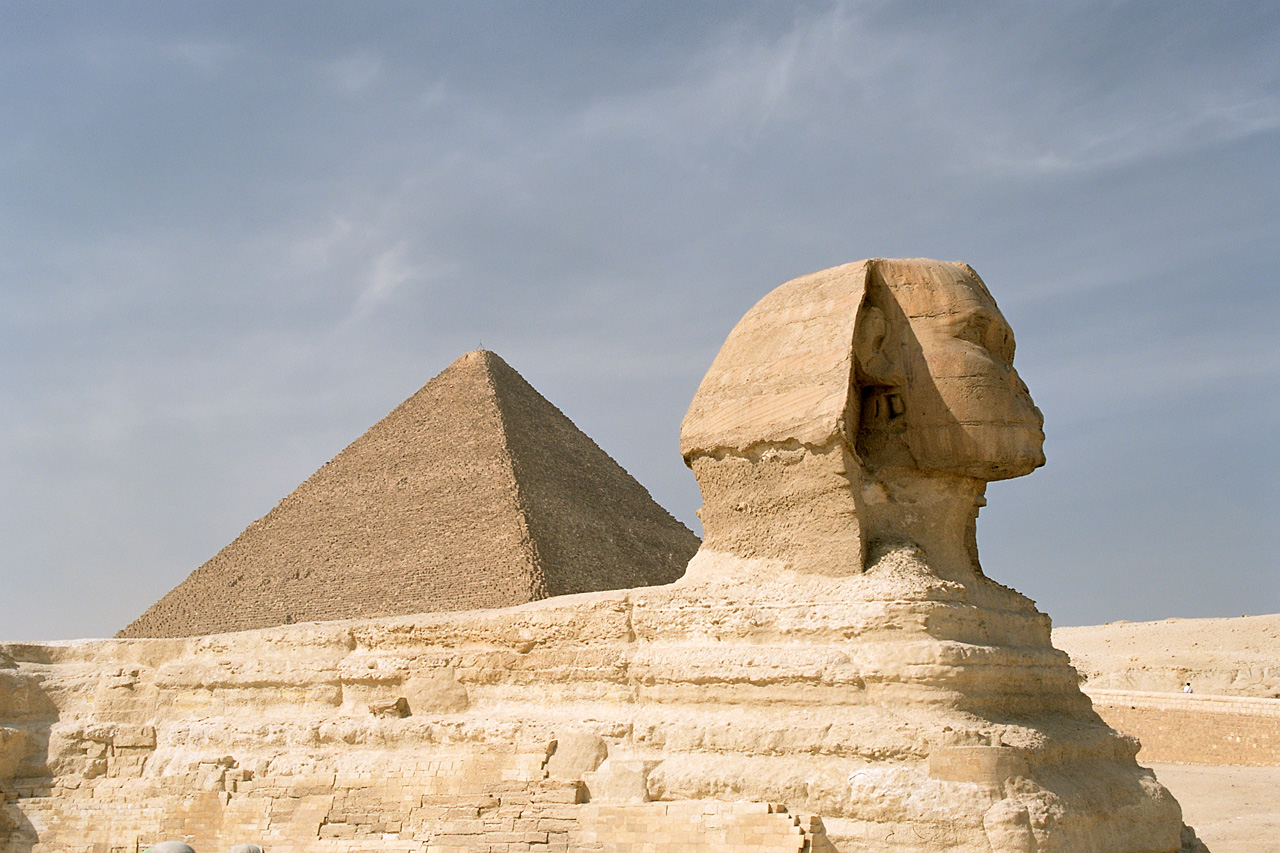
The Great Sphinx of Giza in front of the Great Pyramid of Giza

The Old Kingdom and its royal power reached a zenith under the Fourth Dynasty (2613–2494 BC). King Sneferu, the first king of the Fourth Dynasty, held territory from ancient Libya in the west to the Sinai Peninsula in the east, to Nubia in the south. An Egyptian settlement was founded at Buhen in Nubia which endured for 200 years. After Djoser, Sneferu was the next great pyramid builder. He commissioned the building of three pyramids. The first is called the Meidum Pyramid, named for its location in Egypt. Sneferu abandoned it after the outside casing fell off of the pyramid. The Meidum pyramid was the first to have an above-ground burial chamber. Sneferu used more stones than any other Pharaoh. He also commissioned the Bent Pyramid at Dahshur and the Red Pyramid at North Dahshur.

Sneferu was succeeded by his son, Khufu (2589–2566 BC), who commissioned the Great Pyramid of Giza, with which the fully developed pyramid style was reached. After Khufu's death, his sons Djedefre (2566–2558 BC) and Khafre (2558–2532 BC) may have quarrelled. The latter commissioned the second pyramid and (in traditional thinking) the Great Sphinx of Giza. Recent reexamination of evidence has led Egyptologist Vassil Dobrev to propose that the Sphinx was commissioned by Djedefre as a monument to his father Khufu.Alternatively, the Sphinx has been proposed to be the work of Khafre and Khufu himself.

There were military expeditions into Canaan and Nubia, with Egyptian influence reaching up the Nile into what is today Sudan. The later kings of the Fourth Dynasty were Menkaure (2532–2504 BC), who commissioned the smallest of the three great pyramids in Giza; Shepseskaf (2504–2498 BC); and, perhaps, Djedefptah (2498–2496 BC).

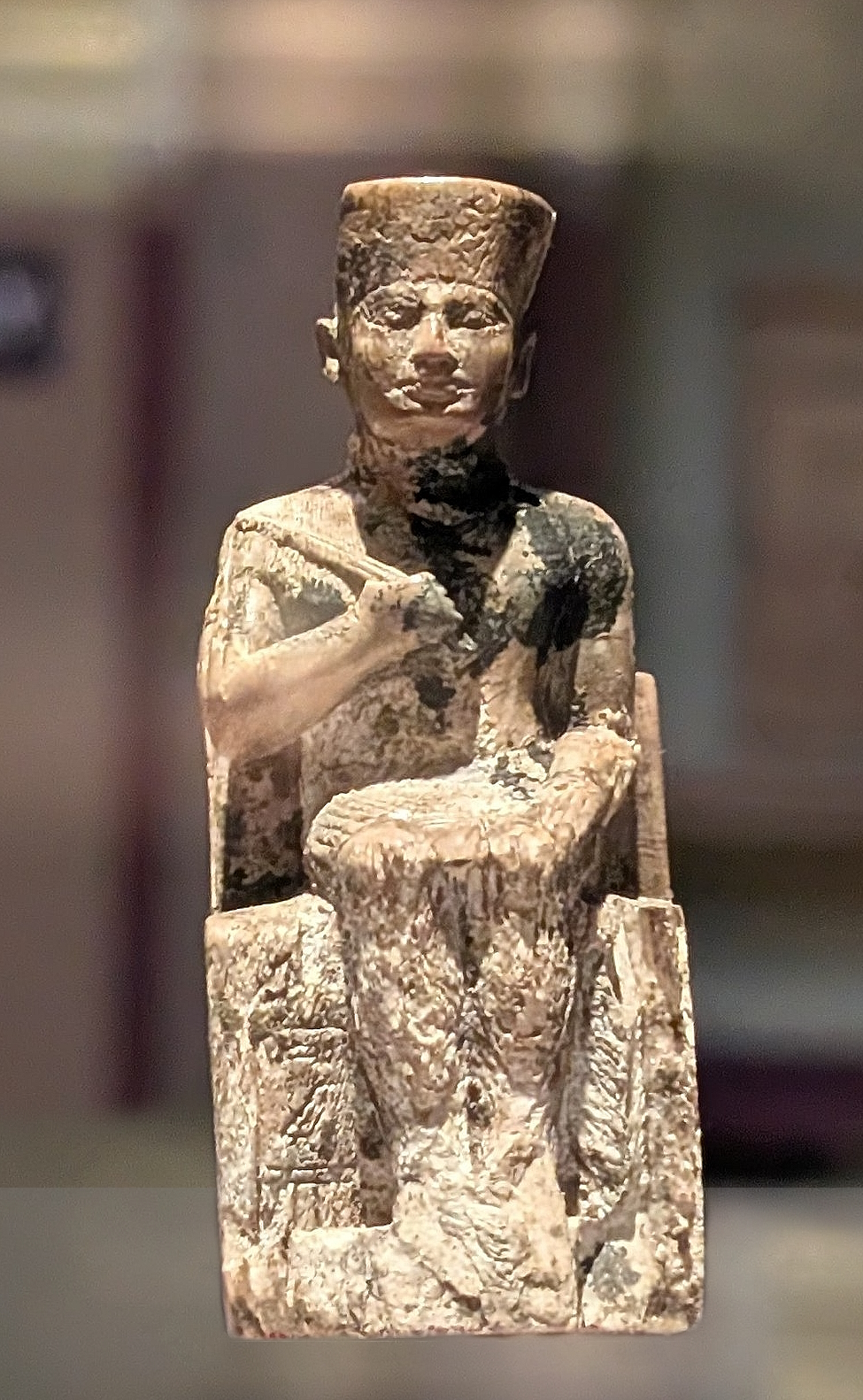
Khufu, the builder of the Great Pyramid at Giza

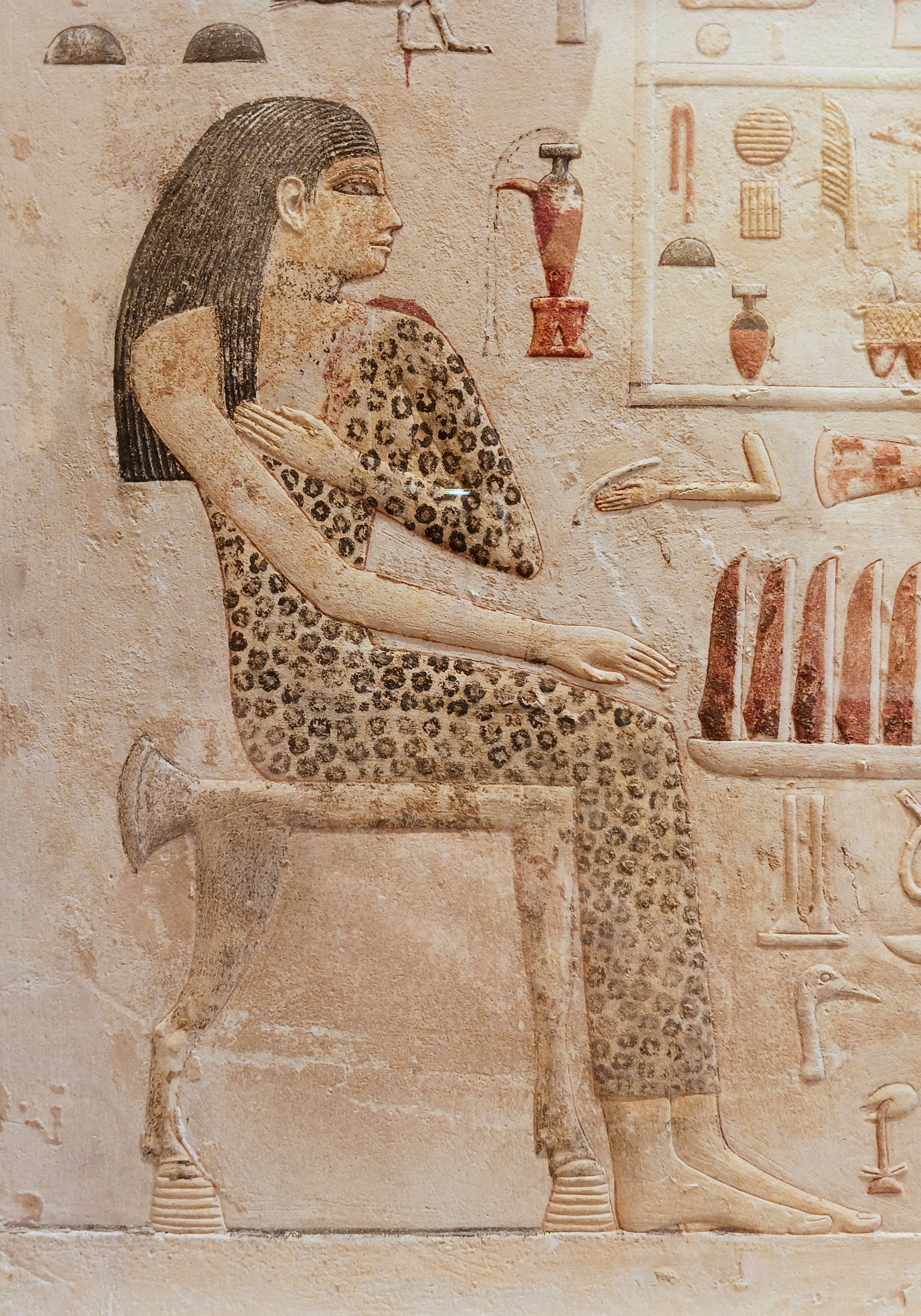
Princess Nefertiabet, likely daughter of Khufu, from her Giza tomb. Louvre Museum E 15591.

=== Fifth Dynasty ===
The Fifth Dynasty (2494–2345 BC) began with Userkaf (2494–2487 BC) and was marked by the growing importance of the cult of sun god Ra. Consequently, fewer efforts were devoted to the construction of pyramid complexes than during the Fourth Dynasty and more to the construction of sun temples in Abusir. Userkaf was succeeded by his son Sahure (2487–2475 BC), who commanded an expedition to Punt. Sahure was in turn succeeded by Neferirkare Kakai (2475–2455 BC), who was Sahure's son. Neferirkare introduced the prenomen in the royal titulary. He was followed by two short-lived kings, his son Neferefre (2455–2453 BC) and Shepseskare, the latter of uncertain parentage. Shepseskare may have been deposed by Neferefre's brother Nyuserre Ini (2445–2421 BC), a long-lived pharaoh who commissioned extensively in Abusir and restarted royal activity in Giza.

The last pharaohs of the dynasty were Menkauhor Kaiu (2421–2414 BC), Djedkare Isesi (2414–2375 BC), and Unas (2375–2345), the earliest ruler to have the Pyramid Texts inscribed in his pyramid.

Egypt's expanding interests in trade goods such as ebony, incense such as myrrh and frankincense, gold, copper, and other useful metals inspired the ancient Egyptians to build suitable ships for navigation of the open sea. They traded with Lebanon for cedar and travelled the length of the Red Sea to the Kingdom of Punt- modern-day Eritrea—for ebony, ivory, and aromatic resins. Shipbuilders of that era did not use pegs (treenails) or metal fasteners, but relied on the rope to keep their ships assembled. Planks and the superstructure were tightly tied and bound together. This period also witnessed direct trade between Egypt and its Aegean neighbors and Anatolia.

The rulers of the dynasty sent expeditions to the stone quarries and gold mines of Nubia and the mines of Sinai. There are references and depictions of military campaigns in Nubia and Asia.

=== Decline into the First Intermediate Period ===
The sixth dynasty peaked during the reigns of Pepi I and Merenre I with flourishing trade, several mining and quarrying expeditions and major military campaigns. Militarily, aggressive expansion into Nubia marked Pepi I's reign. At least five military expeditions were sent into Canaan.

There is evidence that Merenre was not only active in Nubia like Pepi I but also sent officials to maintain Egyptian rule over Nubia from the northern border to the area south of the third cataract.

During the Sixth Dynasty (2345–2181 BC) the power of the pharaoh gradually weakened in favor of powerful nomarchs (regional governors). These no longer belonged to the royal family and their charge became hereditary, thus creating local dynasties largely independent from the central authority of the Pharaoh. However, Nile flood control was still the subject of very large works, including especially the canal to Lake Moeris around 2300 BC, which was likely also the source of water to the Giza pyramid complex centuries earlier.

Internal disorders set in during the incredibly long reign of Pepi II (2278–2214 BC) towards the end of the dynasty. His death, certainly well past that of his intended heirs, might have created succession struggles. The country slipped into civil wars mere decades after the close of Pepi II's reign.

The final blow was the 22nd century BC drought in the region that resulted in a drastic drop in precipitation. For at least some years between 2200 and 2150 BC, this prevented the normal flooding of the Nile.

Whatever its cause, the collapse of the Old Kingdom was followed by decades of famine and strife. An important inscription on the tomb of Ankhtifi, a nomarch during the early First Intermediate Period, describes the pitiful state of the country when famine stalked the land.

== Art ==
The most defining feature of ancient Egyptian art is its function, as that was the entire purpose of creation. Art was not made for enjoyment in the strictest sense, but rather served a role of some kind in Egyptian religion and ideology. This fact manifests itself in the artistic style, even as it evolved over the dynasties. The three primary principles of that style, frontality, composite composition, and hierarchy scale, illustrate this quite well. These characteristics, initiated in the Early Dynastic Period and solidified during the Old Kingdom, persisted with some adaptability throughout the entirety of ancient Egyptian history as the foundation of its art.

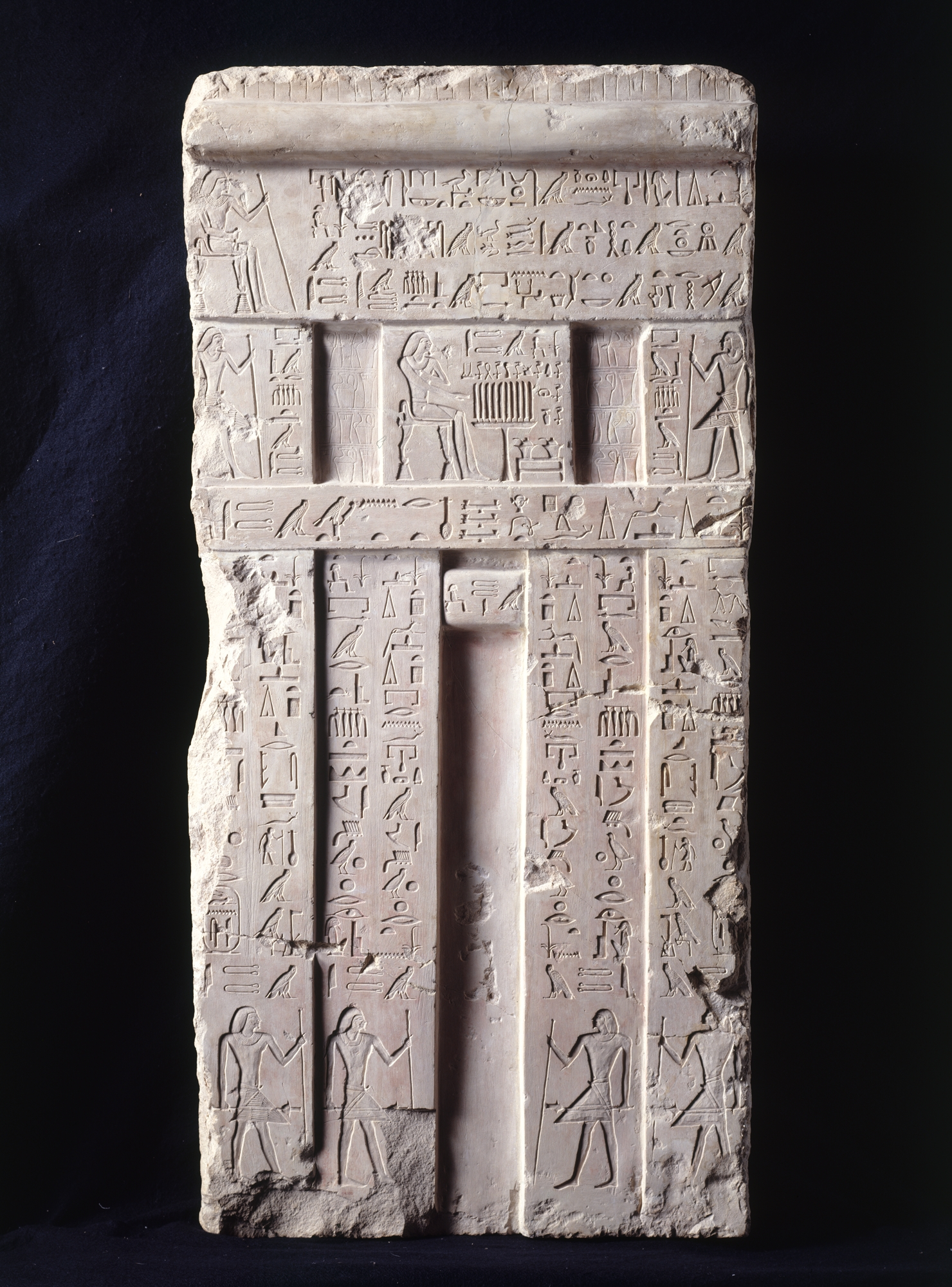
False door from the Tomb of Metjetji. ca. 2353–2323 BC, Dynasty 5–6, Old Kingdom. Tomb of Metjetji at Saqqara.

Frontality, the first principle, indicates that art was watched directly from the front. One was meant to approach a piece as they would a living individual, for it was meant to be a place of manifestation. The act of interaction would bring forth the divine entity represented in the art. It was therefore imperative that whoever was represented be as identifiable as possible. The guidelines developed in the Old Kingdom and the later grid system developed in the Middle Kingdom ensured that art was axial, symmetrical, proportional, and most importantly reproducible and therefore recognizable. Composite composition, the second principle, also contributes to the goal of identification. Multiple perspectives were used in order to ensure that the onlooker could determine precisely what they saw.

Though Egyptian art almost always includes descriptive text, literacy rates were not high, so the art gave another method for communicating the same information. One of the best examples of composite composition is the human form. In most two-dimensional relief, the head, legs, and feet are seen in profile, while the torso faces directly front. Another common example is an aerial view of a building or location. The third principle, the hierarchy of scale, illustrates relative importance in society. The larger the figure, the more important the individual. The king is usually the largest, aside from deities. The similarity in size equated to similarity in position. However, this is not to say that physical differences were not shown as well. Women, for example, are usually shown as smaller than men. Children retain adult features and proportions but are substantially smaller in size.

Aside from the three primary conventions, there are several characteristics that can help date a piece to a particular time frame. Proportions of the human figure are one of the most distinctive, as they vary between kingdoms. Old Kingdom male figures have characteristically broad shoulders and a long torso, with obvious musculature. On the other hand, females are narrower in the shoulders and waist, with longer legs and a shorter torso. However, in the Sixth Dynasty, the male figures lose their muscularity and their shoulders narrow. The eyes also tend to get much larger.

In order to help maintain the consistency of these proportions, the Egyptians used a series of eight guidelines to divide the body. They occurred at the following locations: the top of the head, the hairline, the base of the neck, the underarms, the tip of the elbow or the bottom of the ribcage, the top of the thigh at the bottom of the buttocks, the knee, and the middle of the lower leg.

From the soles of the feet to the hairline was also divided into thirds, one-third between the soles and the knee, another third between the knee and the elbow, and the final third from the elbow to the hairline. The broad shoulders that appeared in the Fifth Dynasty constituted roughly that one-third length as well. These proportions not only help with the identification of representations and the reproduction of art but also tie into the Egyptian ideal of order, which tied into the solar aspect of their religion and the inundations of the Nile.

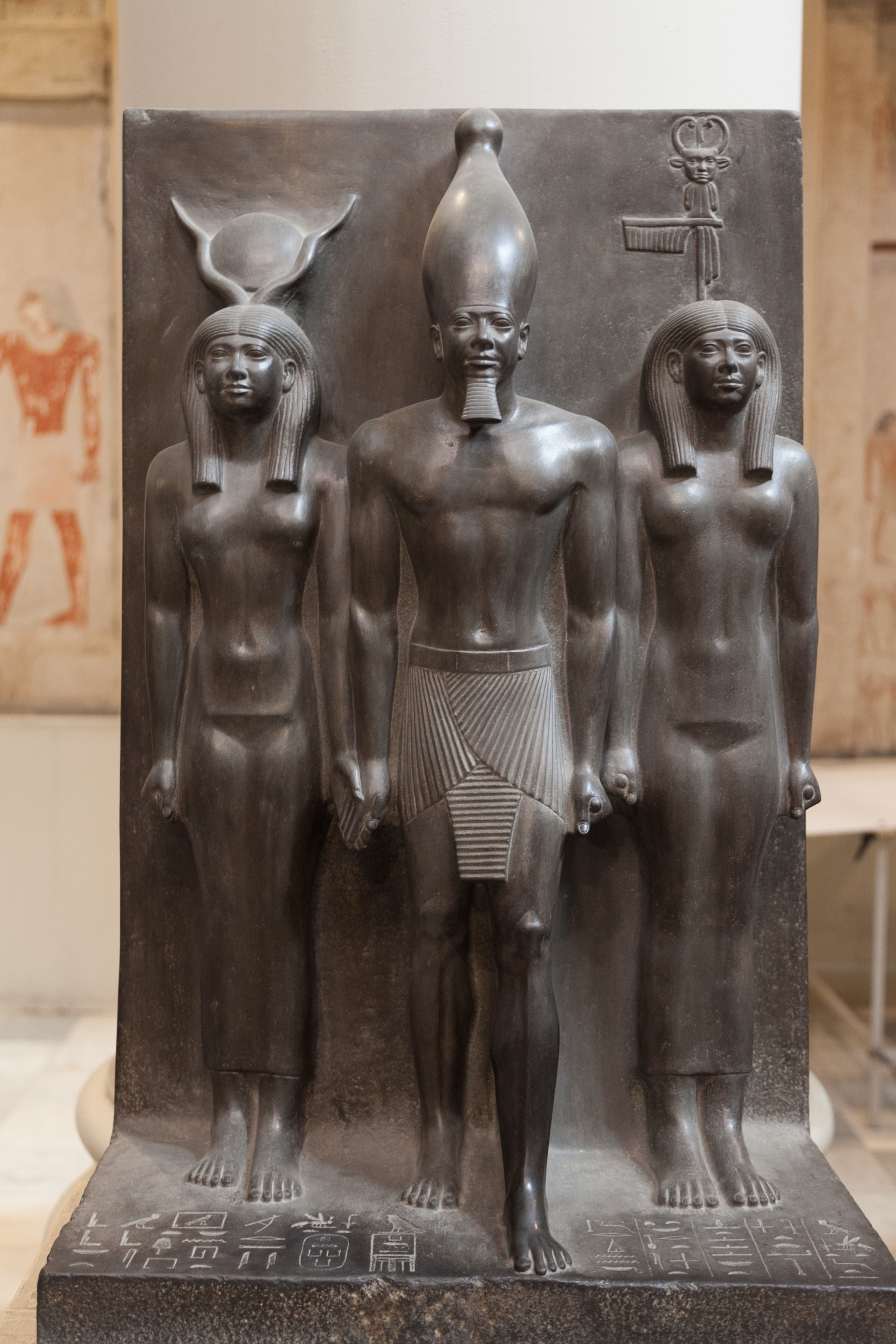
A statue of Menkaure with Hathor and Anput from the Egyptian Museum in Cairo. Demonstrates a group statue of graywacke with Old Kingdom features and proportions.

Though the above concepts apply to most, if not all, figures in Egyptian art, there are additional characteristics that applied to the representations of the king. Their appearance was not an exact rendering of the king's visage, though kings are somewhat identifiable through looks alone. Identification could be supplied by inscriptions or context. A huge, more important part of a king's portrayal was about the idea of the office of kingship, which were dependent on the time period. The Old Kingdom was considered a golden age for Egypt, a grandiose height to which all future kingdoms aspired.

As such, the king was portrayed as young and vital, with features that agreed with the standards of beauty of the time. The musculature seen in male figures was also applied to kings. A royal rite, the jubilee run which was established during the Old Kingdom, involved the king running around a group of markers that symbolized the geographic borders of Egypt. This was meant to be a demonstration of the king's physical vigor, which determined his capacity to continue his reign. This idea of kingly youth and strength were pervasive in the Old Kingdom and thus shown in the art.

The sculpture was a major product of the Old Kingdom. The position of the figures in this period was mostly limited to sitting or standing, either with feet together or in the striding pose. Group statues of the king with either gods or family members, typically his wife and children, were also common.

It was not just the subject of sculpture that was important, but also the material: The use of hard stone, such as gneiss, graywacke, schist, and granite, was relatively common in the Old Kingdom. The color of the stone had a great deal of symbolism and was chosen deliberately. Four colors were distinguished in the ancient Egyptian language: black, green, red, and white. Black was associated with Egypt due to the color of the soil after the Nile flood, green with vegetation and rebirth, red with the sun and its regenerative cycle, and white with purity.

The statue of Menkaure with Hathor and Anput is an example of a typical Old Kingdom sculpture. The three figures display frontality and axiality, while fitting with the proportions of this time period. The graywacke came from the Eastern Desert in Egypt and is therefore associated with rebirth and the rising of the sun in the east.

== Old Kingdom genetics ==
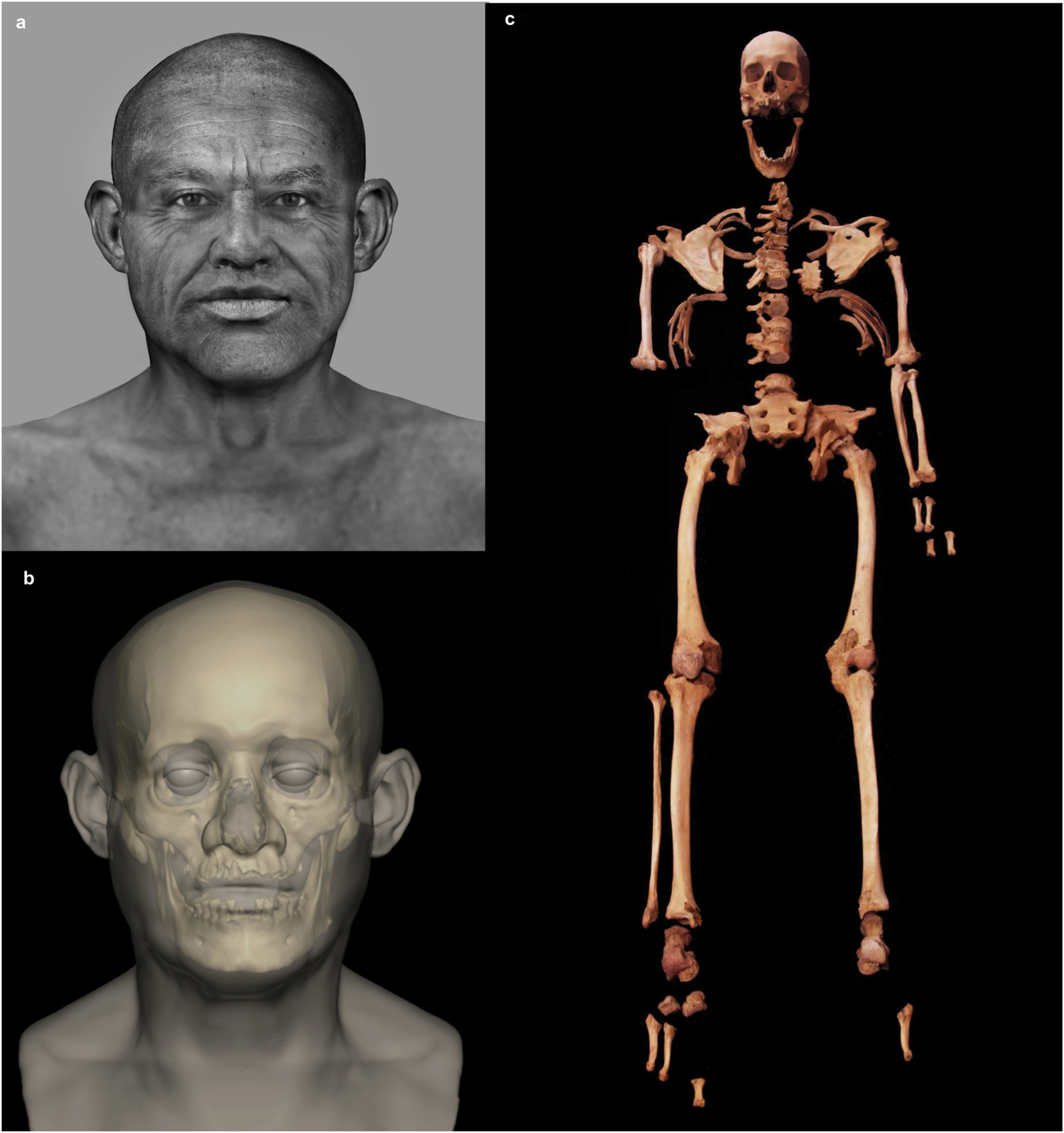
Facial reconstruction and depiction created from the Nuwayrat individual skull.

For the first time, in a 2025 publication by the scientific journal Nature, a whole-genome genetic study was able to give insights into the genetic background of Old Kingdom individuals, by sequencing the whole genome of an Old Kingdom adult male Egyptian of relatively high-status, radiocarbon-dated to 2855–2570 BC, with funerary practices archeologically attributed to the Third and Fourth Dynasty, which was excavated in Nuwayrat (Nuerat, نويرات), in a cliff 265 km south of Cairo. Before this study, whole-genome sequencing of ancient Egyptians from the early periods of Egyptian Dynastic history had not yet been accomplished, mainly because of the problematic DNA preservation conditions in Egypt.

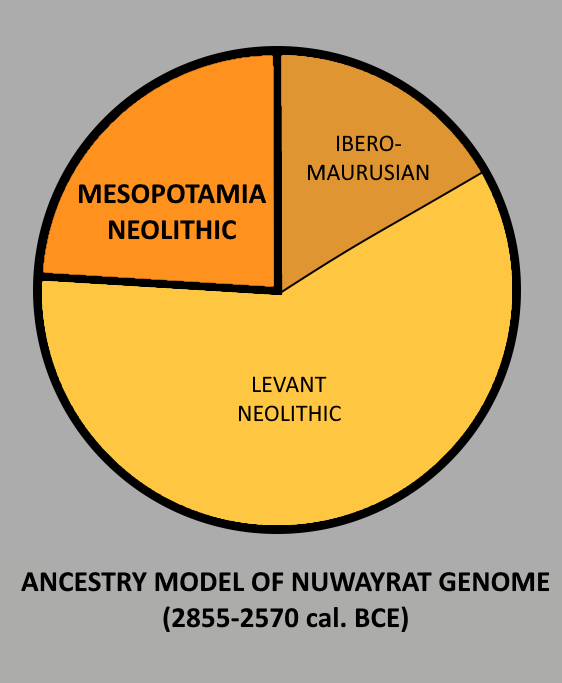
Ancestry model of Egyptian genome from Nuwayrat.

The corpse had been placed intact in a large circular clay pot without embalming, and then installed inside a cliff tomb, which accounts for the comparatively good level of conservation of the skeleton and its DNA. Most of his genome was found to be associated with North African Neolithic ancestry, but about 20% of his genetic ancestry could be sourced to the eastern Fertile Crescent, including Mesopotamia. The genetic profile was most closely represented by a two-source model, in which 77.6% ± 3.8% of the ancestry corresponded to genomes from the Middle Neolithic Moroccan site of Skhirat-Rouazi (dated to 4780–4230 BC), which itself consists of predominantly (76.4 ± 4.0%) Levant Neolithic ancestry and (23.6 ± 4.0%) minor Iberomaurusian ancestry, while the remainder (22.4% ± 3.8%) was most closely related to known genomes from Neolithic Mesopotamia (dated to 9000-8000 BC). Genomes from the Neolithic/Chalcolithic Levant only appeared as a minor third-place component in three-source models. A 2022 DNA study had already shown evidence of gene flow from the Mesopotamian and Zagros regions into surrounding areas, including Anatolia, during the Neolithic, but not as far as Egypt yet.

In terms of chronology, Egypt was one of the first areas to adopt the Neolithic package emerging from West Asia as early as the 6th millennium BC. Population genetics in the Nile Valley observed a marked change around this period, as shown by odontometric and dental tissue changes. Cultural exchange and trade between the two regions then continued through the 4th millennium BC, as shown by the transfer of Mesopotamian Late Uruk period features to the Nile Valley of the later Predynastic Period. Migrations flows from Mesopotamia accompanied such cultural exchanges, possibly through the sea routes of the Mediterranean and the Red Sea or through yet un-sampled intermediaries in the Levant, which could explain the relative smallness of genetic influence from known Chalcolithic/Bronze Age Levantines populations.

Overall, the 2025 study "provides direct evidence of genetic ancestry related to the eastern Fertile Crescent in ancient Egypt". This genetic connection suggests that there had been ancient migration flows from the eastern Fertile Crescent to Egypt, in addition to the exchanges of objects and imagery (domesticated animals and plants, writing systems...) already observed. This suggests a pattern of wide cultural and demographic expansion from the Mesopotamian region, which affected both Anatolia and Egypt during this period.

The authors acknowledged limitations of the 2025 study, such as their reliance on a single Egyptian genome for analysis, and known limitations in predicting the above-referenced phenotypic traits in understudied populations. Analyses excluded any substantial ancestry in the Nuwayrat genome related to a previously published 4,500-year-old hunter-gatherer genome from the Mota cave in Ethiopia, or other individuals in central, eastern, or southern Africa.

Regarding the supplement facial reconstruction, the researchers noted that while the DNA analysis is indicative of population origin, there was no physical evidence of any particular skin colour, eye colour, or hair colour, and therefore, the reconstruction was produced in black and white without head hair or facial hair.

== Gallery ==
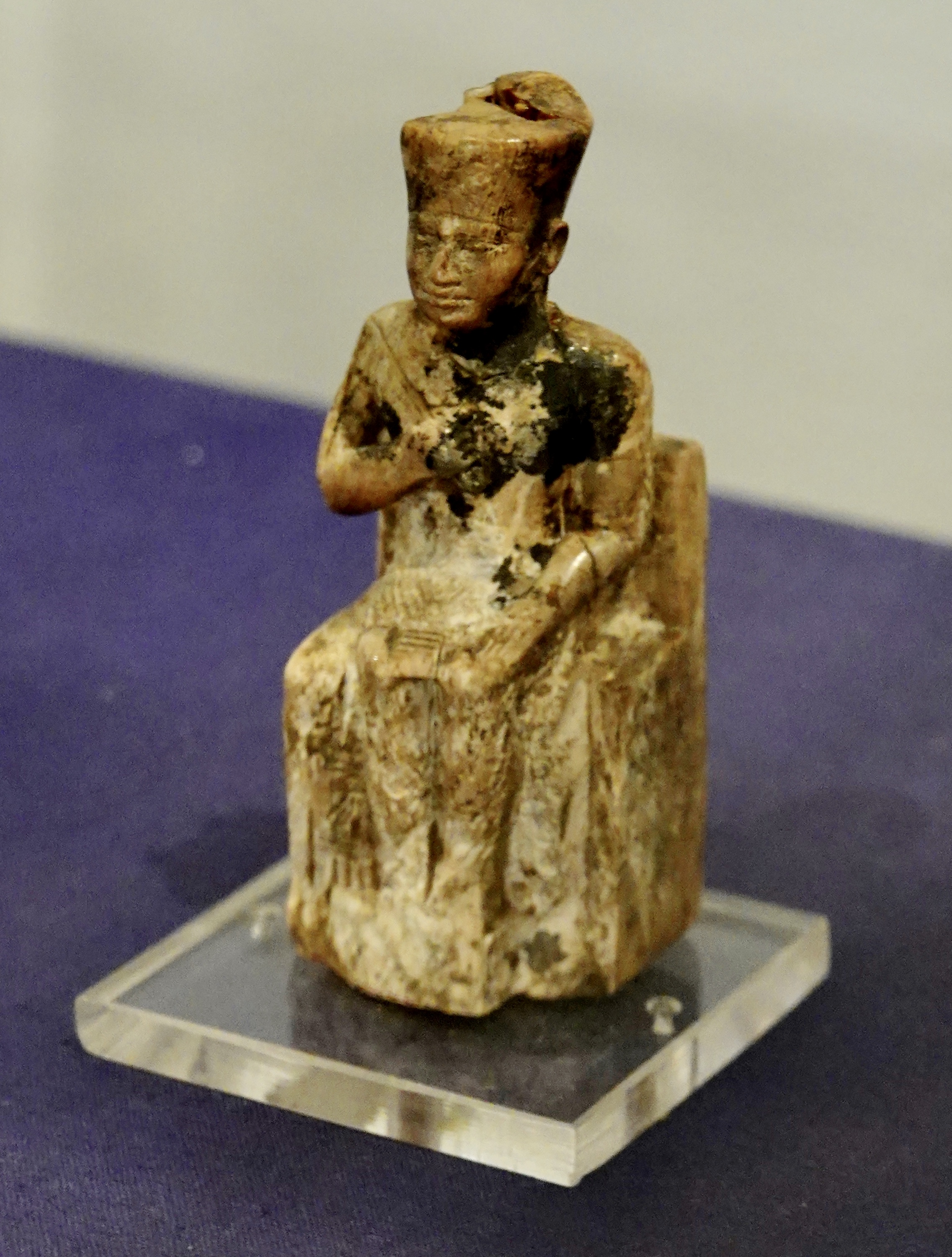
King khufu statue at Cairo museum

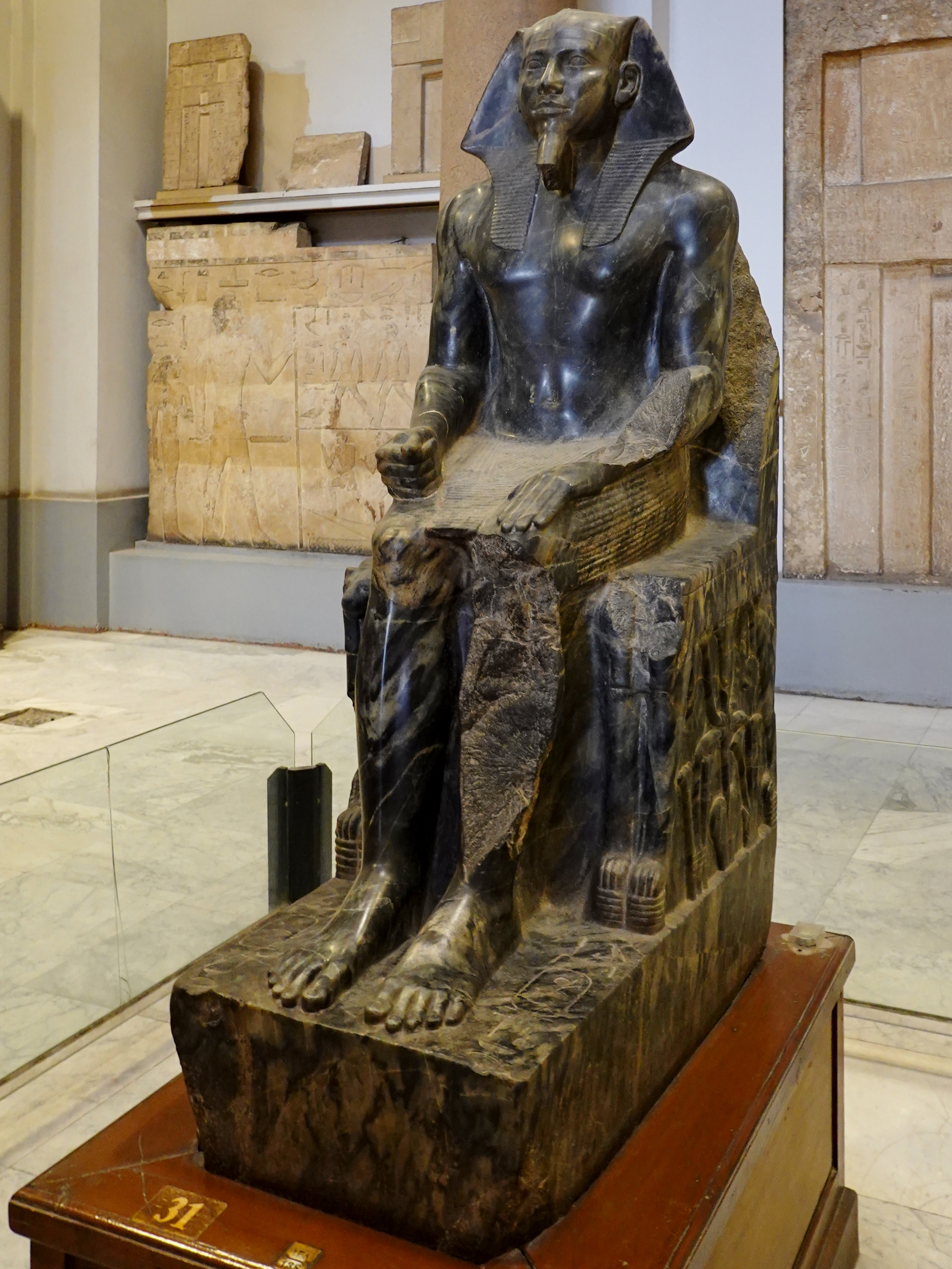
King khafre statue at Cairo museum

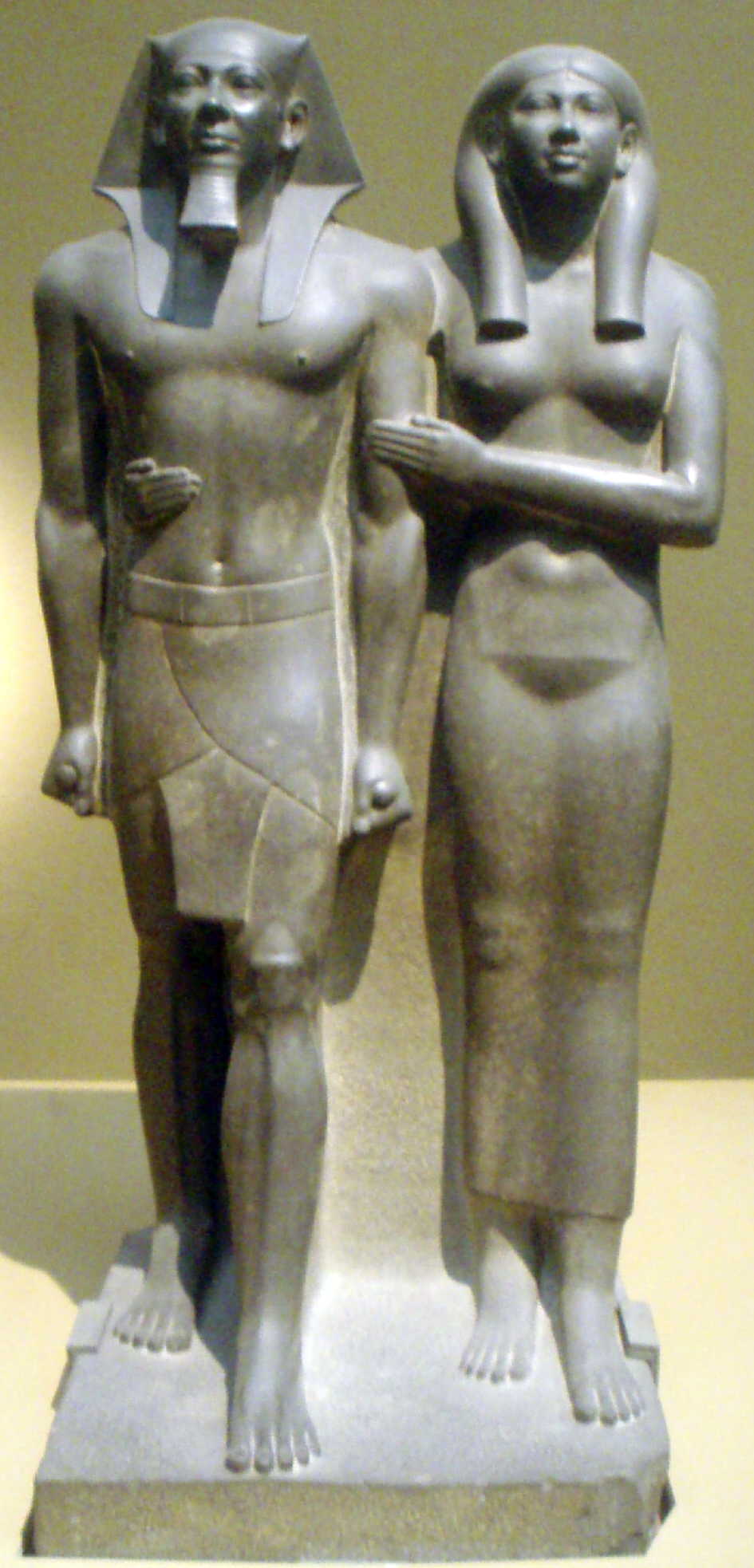
Greywacke statue of Menkaure and Queen Khamerernebty II at the Boston Museum of Fine Arts

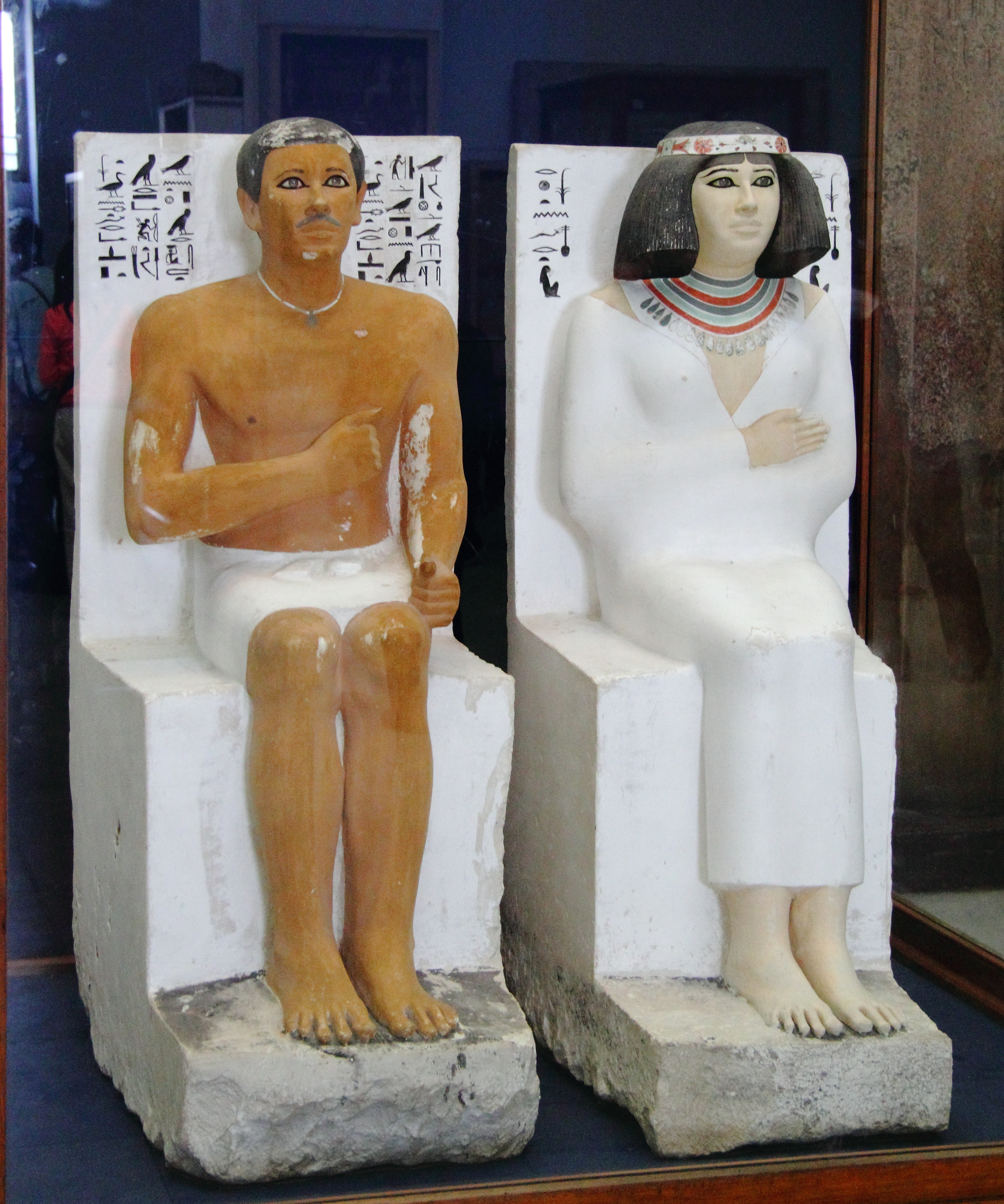
Rahotep and Nofret statues at Cairo museum

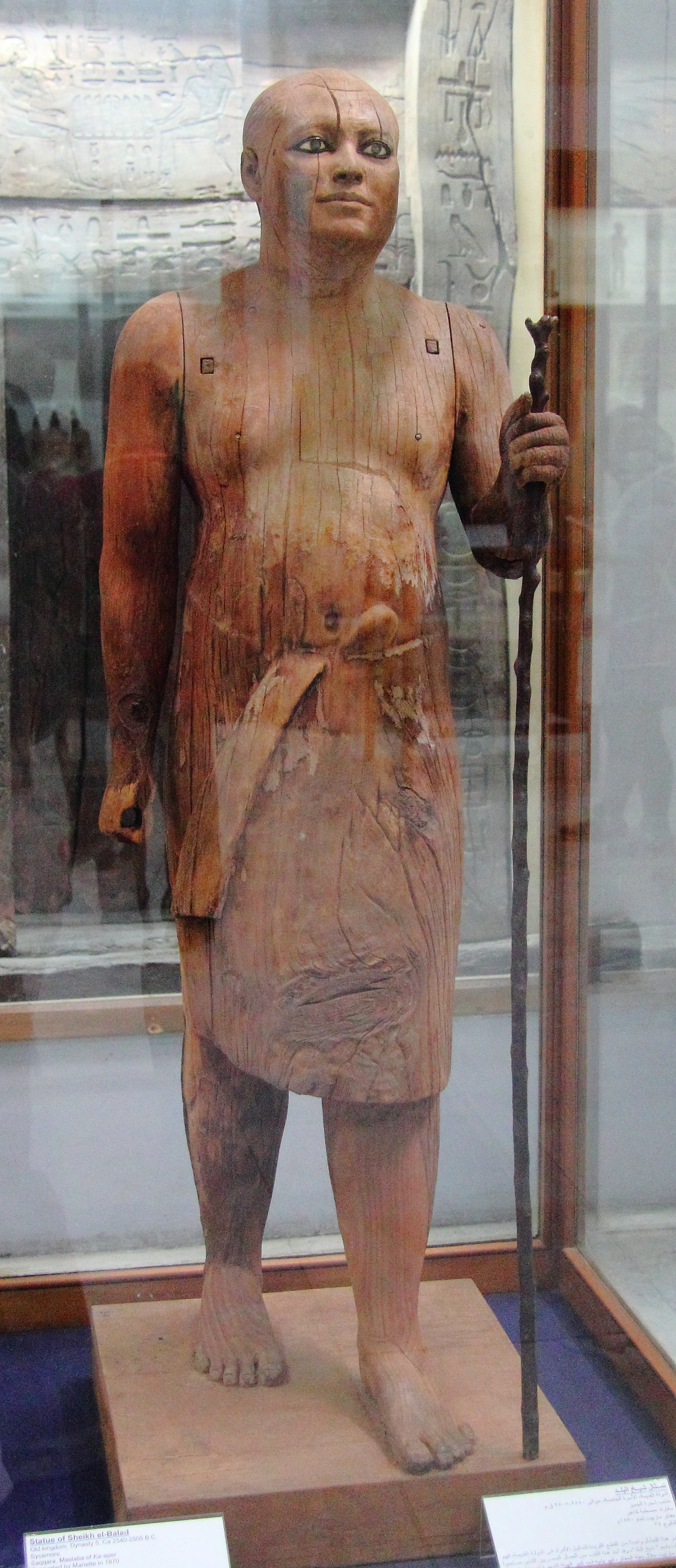
Kaaper around 2500 BC

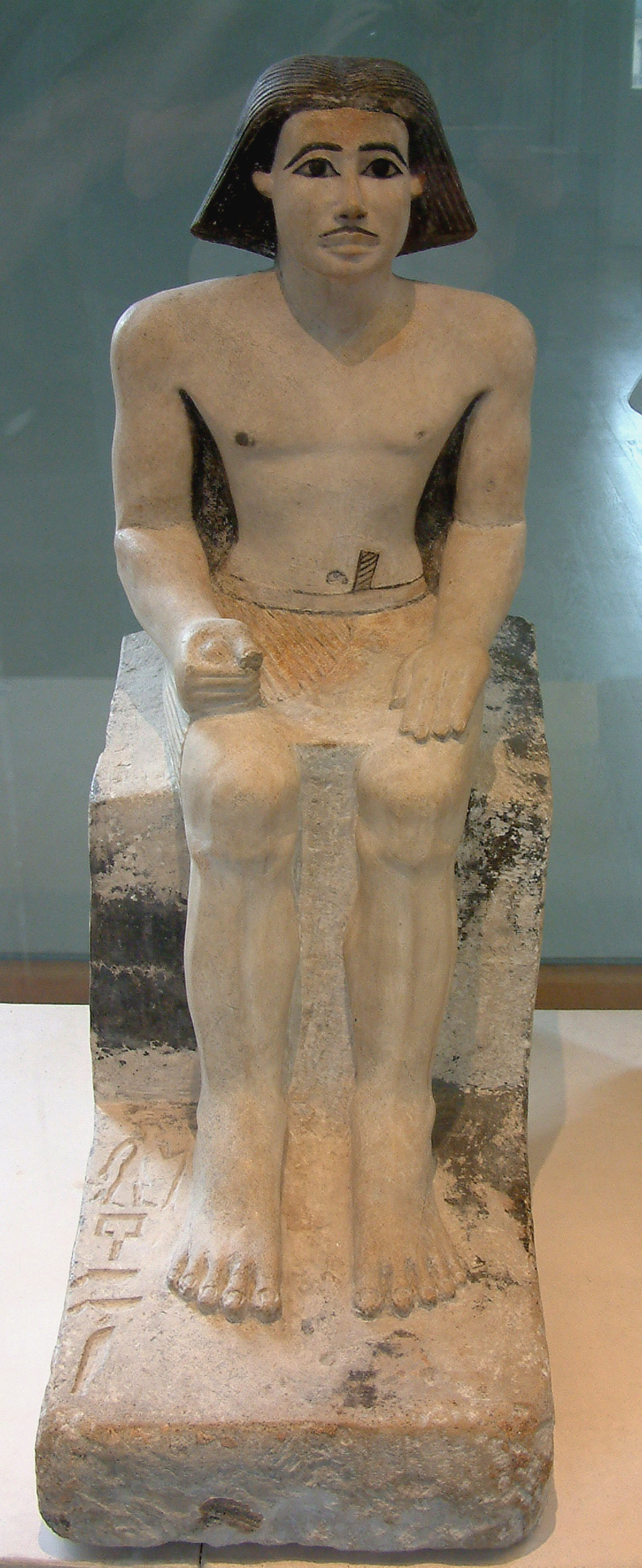
Majordomo Keki statue, 6th dynasty at Louvre museum

Preceded by Early Dynastic Period	Time Periods of Egypt; 2686–2181 BC	Succeeded by First Intermediate Period
