= Prince Djedi =

Djedi
sw r x t D&d i R11
- Prince of Egypt
- Father: Rahotep
- Mother: Nofret

Djedi was an Egyptian prince who lived during Fourth Dynasty of Egypt. He was a son of Prince Rahotep and Nofret, possibly a grandson of king Sneferu and nephew of king Khufu. He had two brothers and three sisters. He is depicted in the tomb chapels of his parents and bears there the title "King's Acquaintance".

In an ancient Egyptian tale, "Khufu and the Magicians", mention is made of a magician called Djedi, and it is possible that this mythical person was inspired by the real prince Djedi, Khufu's nephew.

== See also ==
- Westcar Papyrus
