= Prince Rahotep =

Prince of Ancient Egypt

Rahotep
- Prince of Egypt, Priest of Ra
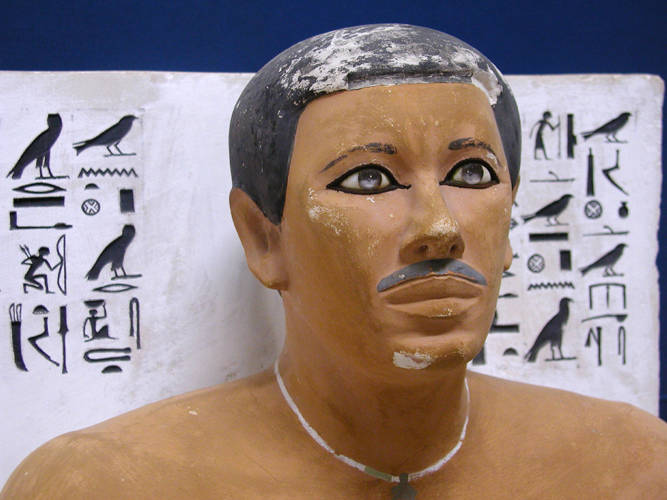
- Statue of Rahotep
Egyptian name
sw t zA n X t f r a Htp t p
- Burial: Mastaba, Meidum M6 M6
- Spouse: Nofret
- Father: Sneferu
- Mother: Hetepheres I
- Children: Djedi, Itu, Neferkau, Mereret, Nedjemib, Sethtet

Rahotep, (r’-htp(.w) - satisfied in god Ra), was a prince, the son of the Pharaoh Sneferu and his first wife Hetepheres I, in ancient Egypt during the 4th Dynasty, reign of his father Sneferu possibly his brother Khufu too. (Note: Zahi Hawass note on possible Huni as his father, but still no evidence exists.)

== Biography ==
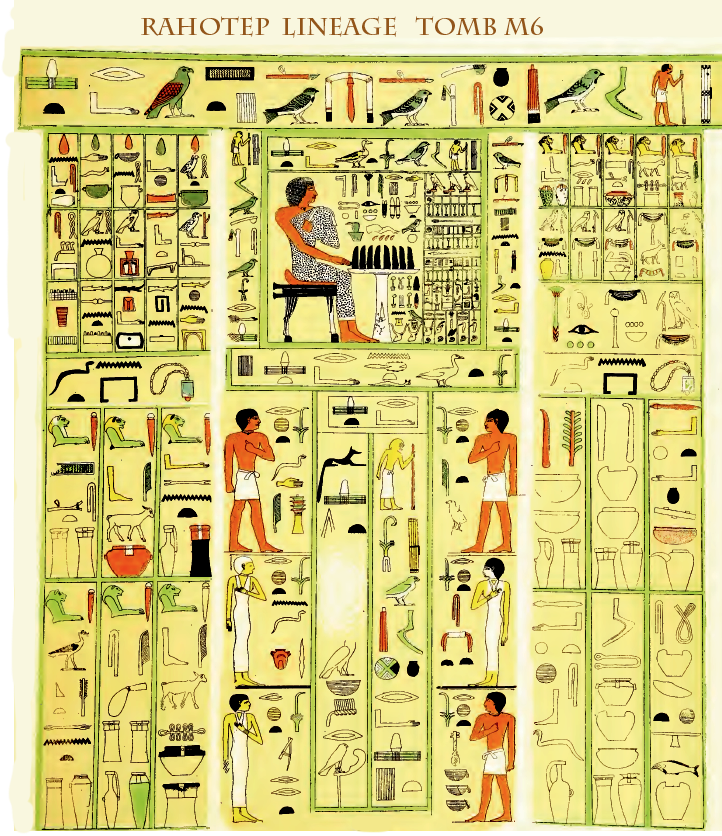
Illustration on the mastaba that depicts Rahotep with his six children

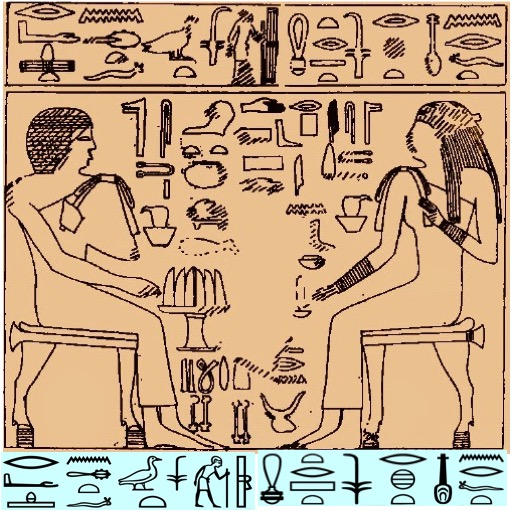
Rahotep with his wife Nofret at the offering table, mastaba Meidum M6

As a member of the royal family, he was entrusted with a number of important functions in the administration of the state. Its historical importance derives from the knowledge gained from the exploration of his tomb no. 6 in Meidum, near the pyramid of pharaoh Sneferu. Rahotep was surely enough an influential magnate, and if we consider the time of intensive pyramid building, especially in Dashur, (Note: Dashur was chosen mainly for its proximity to the Nile and the easy transport of building materials for Sneferu's pyramids construction.) as to which required the necessary logistical base of all works, the organisation of the construction itself and the provision of the necessary manpower. Social structures for artisans and their families were built around large buildings, as they later developed in Giza during the reign of Rahotep's brother Cheops, as evidenced by archaeological findings in Heit el-Ghurhab. Rahotep took part in these works with the title of "head of construction supervision", albeit within the scope of his provincial powers. His affiliation with the royal family was emphasised by a series of titles, which were both symbolic or religious, and titles expressing his active competence.

== Tomb ==
The tomb was uncovered by Auguste Mariette in 1871 and its detailed research was described by Petrie in 1892. The body of it is, however, all built of bricks throughout, and is now about 6.6 m high, after most of the gravel top is gone. It was on the plan that it was at first symmetrical 52 m long, and 33 m wide, with a central pit, two false doors on the East face, and a second pit nearly behind the North door. Inside the innermost south - west corner is a division in the mass of brickwork, which can hardly have any meaning in terms of design, as it runs too close to the chamber. Afterwards it was enlarged on the South, and west, and a large addition was made on the North, marked as the "annex". The decorations of the tomb walls were badly damaged and only partial drawings were identified as presented by Petrie.

== Rahotep and Nofret statue ==
The most famous find of Mariette's workmen was the statue of Rahotep and his wife Nofret, simultaneously exhibited in the Egyptian Museum in Cairo. At the head of the statues are hieroglyphic records of Rahotep's functions. Rahotep’s titles were inscribed on a magnificent statue of him which, with a statue of his wife, was excavated from his mastabas at Meidum in 1871 by Auguste Mariette. These describe him as "High Priest of Ra at Heliopolis" (with the added title, "Unique to Heliopolis, Ra's town of Greatest of Seers"), "Director of Expeditions and Supervisor of Works". He also has a title given to high nobility, "The son of the king, begotten of his body".
Nofret and Rahotep had three sons Djedi, Itu and Neferkau and three daughters, Mereret, Nedjemib and Sethtet as they are depicted in Rahotep's tomb.
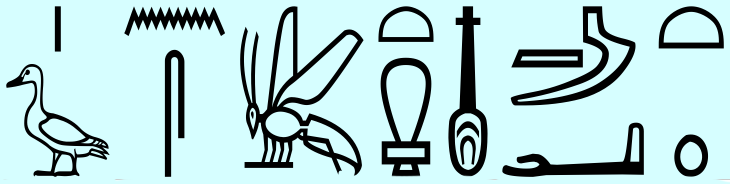
Overall, the frescoes provide a picture of the grandmaster's life before c. 26th century BC. A similar image is also provided by the tomb of Rahotep's brother Nefermaat (Meidum No. 16). (Note: Eldest son of Pharaoh Sneferu, Vizier, Keeper of the Royal Seal.)

== Representations of Rahotep ==
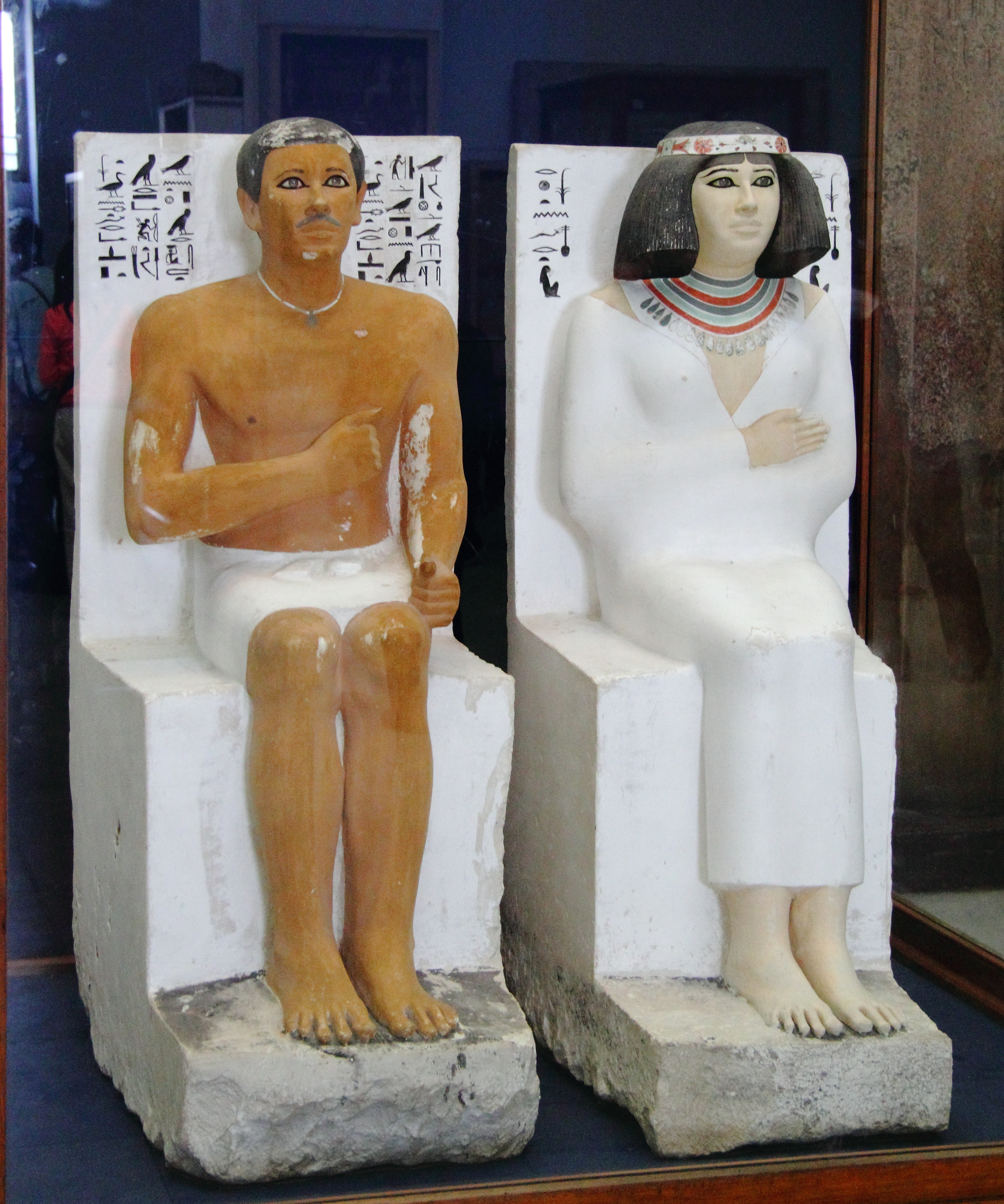
Nofret and Rahotep's statue at the Egyptian Museum in Cairo

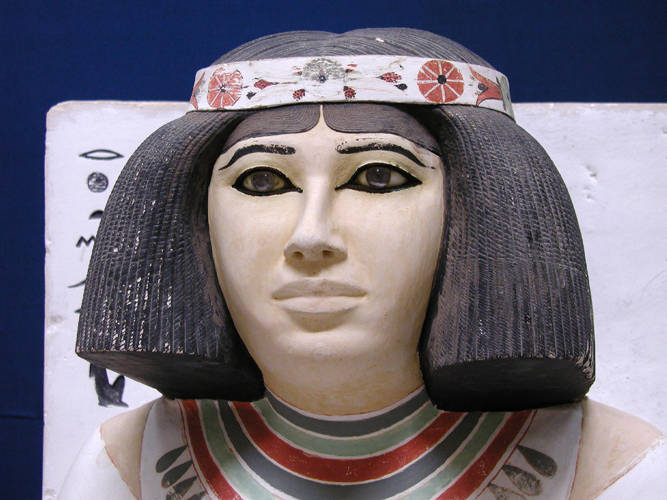
Nofret-(Nfr-t)

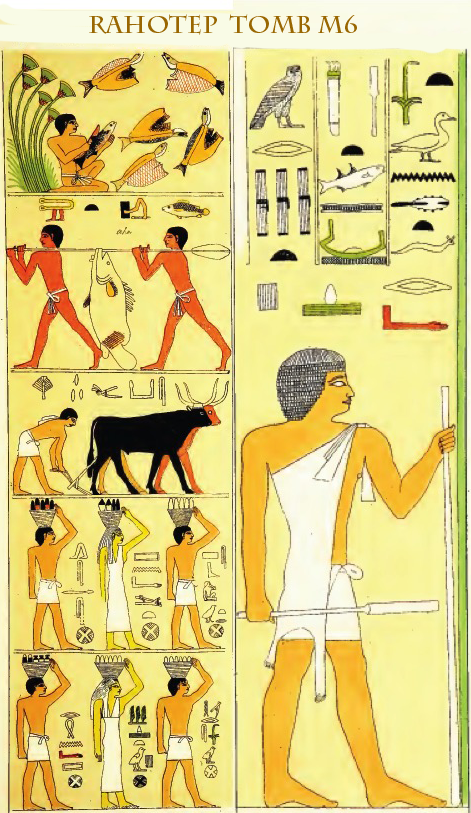
Fresco in the niche of the southern wall of the tomb of Rahotep Meidum No.6

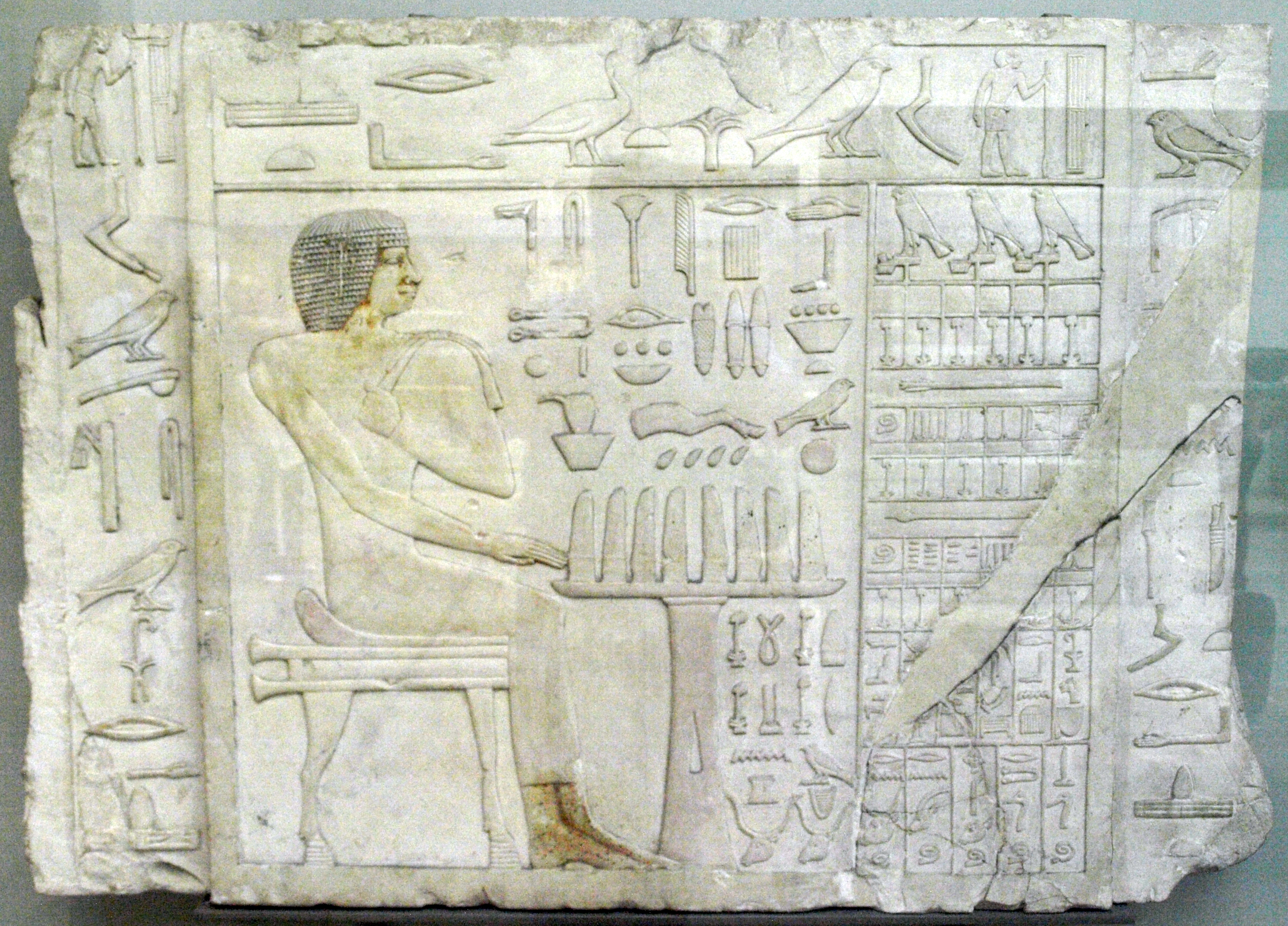
Rahotep's slab stela at the British Museum

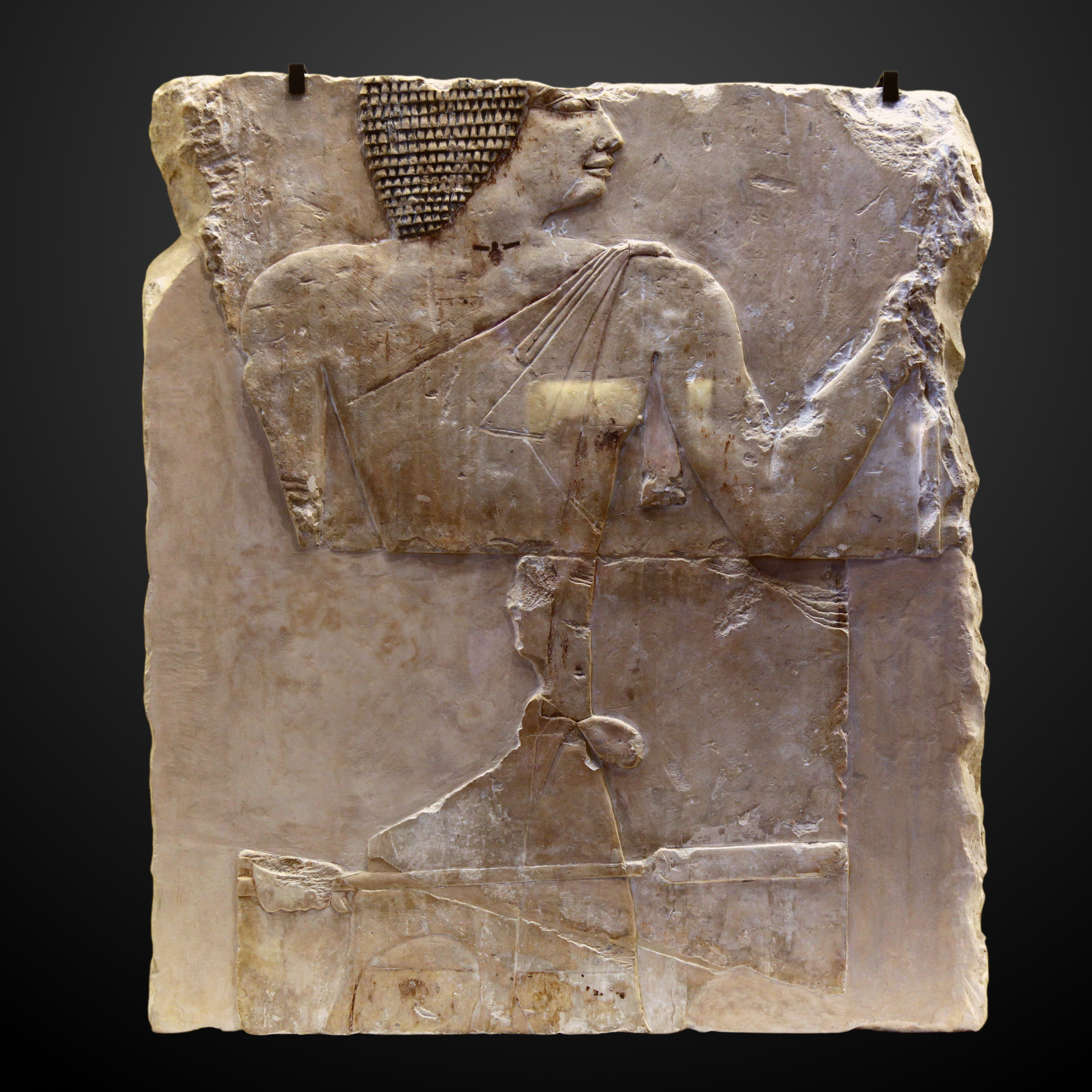
Stele of Rahotep's mastaba, on display at the Louvre
