= Nofret =

Ancient Egyptian princess of 4th Dynasty

- Princess of Egypt
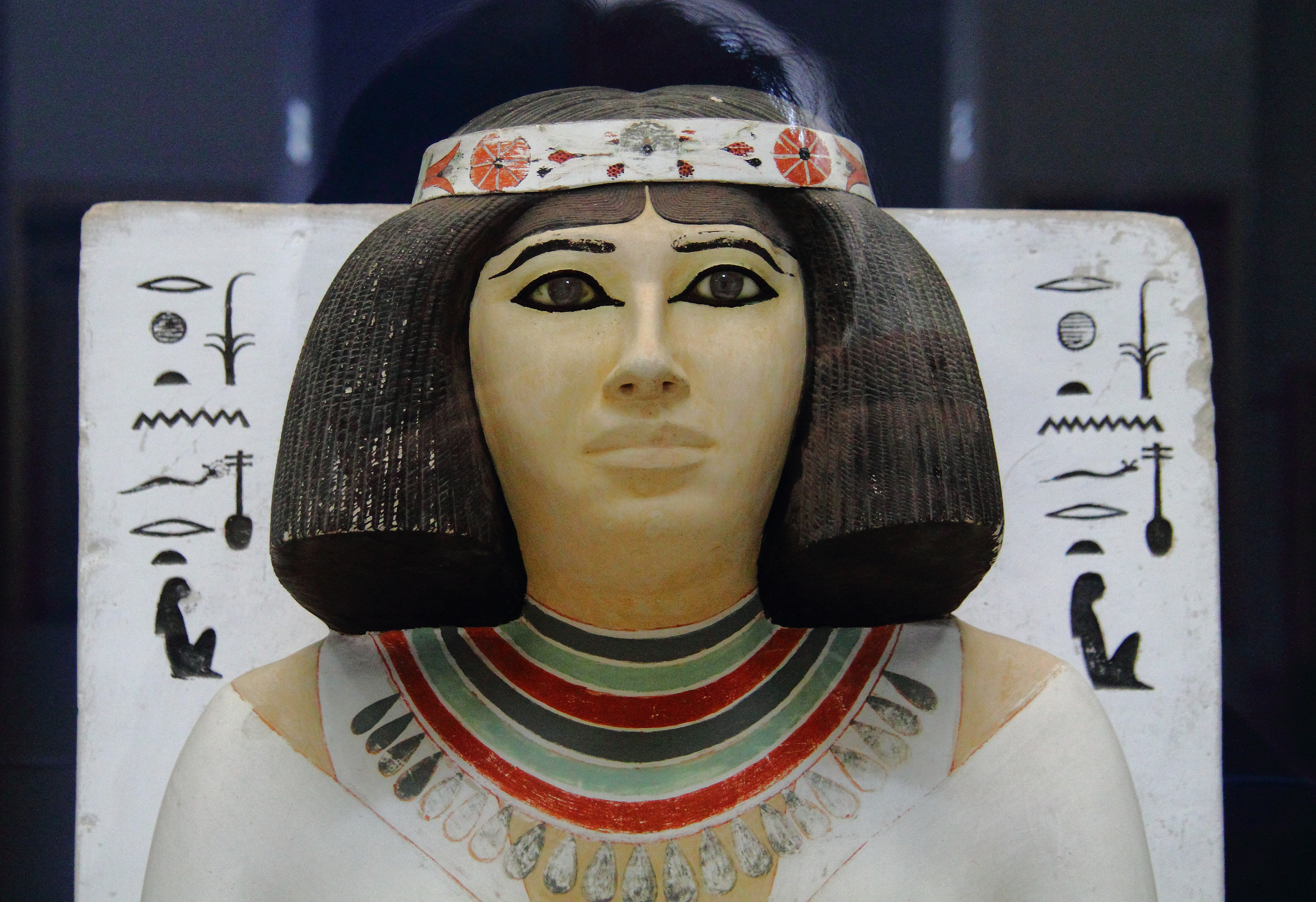
- Nofret's statue, Cairo Museum
Egyptian name
sw r x t n f r nfr t B1(Nfr-t)
King's Acquaintance
- Burial: mastaba at Meidum
- Spouse: Prince Rahotep
- Children: ♂ Djedi ♂ Itu ♂ Neferkau ♀ Mereret ♀ Nedjemib ♀ Sethtet

Nofret was a noblewoman and princess who lived in Ancient Egypt during the 4th dynasty of Egypt c. 2613 to 2494 BC. Nefert means "beautiful". Nofret is alternatively known as Nefert or Neferet.

== Biography ==
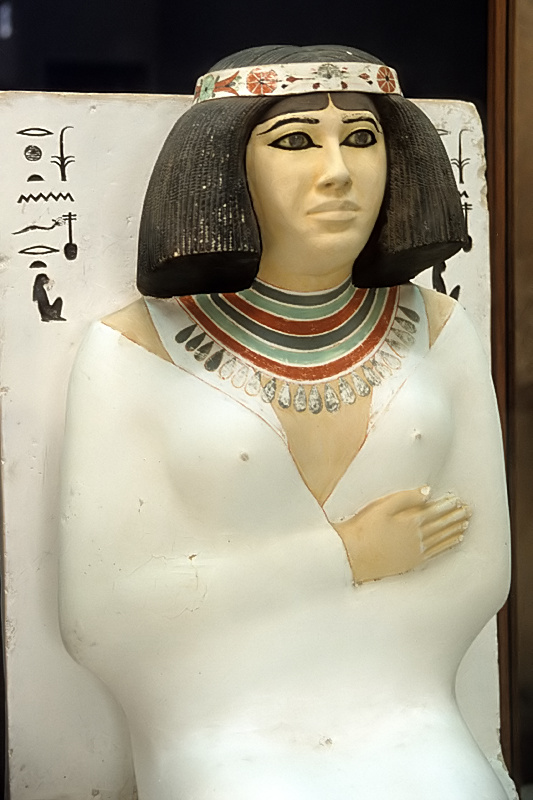
Nofret's statue in the Egyptian Museum, Cairo

Nofret's parents are not known. Nofret married Prince Rahotep, a son of Pharaoh Sneferu. She had six children with Rahotep: three daughters - Mereret, Nedjemib, and Sethtet - and three sons, Djedi, Itu, and Neferkau. They all had the same title of "King's Acquaintance".

Nofret was buried with her husband in mastaba 6 at Meidum. In 1871 by Daninos, beautiful statues of Rahotep and Nofret were found. Nofret is depicted with a black wig and very fair face. Her titles in hieroglyphs on the back of her chair name her as "King's Acquaintance". The statues are now in the Egyptian Museum in Cairo. The mastaba of the couple had two burial chambers and two cult chapels. The Southern cult chapel belonged to Rahotep, the northern one to Nofret. Here she is depicted with Rahotep in front of an offering table. The inscription over the scene provides a second title for her: miteret (translation still not known today).

== Statues of Nofret and Rahotep ==
Prince Rahotep's statue has six columns of text, naming his titles and duties, with columns three and six, each ending with his name, Ra-Hotep. Nofret has identical texts, one column both right and left. Her name appears at the bottom, with the determinative for 'women'. Her complete name is "Nsw-r(kh)-t, Nfr-t". The last, nfr-t means "beautiful woman" (the t being the bread bun for feminine); nsw-r(kh)-t, means "King's Acquaintance". Nofret's statue depicts her with noticeably paler skin than her male counterpart and with blue eyes. Her hair is hidden by a dark thick wig, though her natural hairline, showing dark straight hair, is visible. Nofret is seen wearing a floral diadem, similar to actual diadems made of gold with inlays found at Giza.

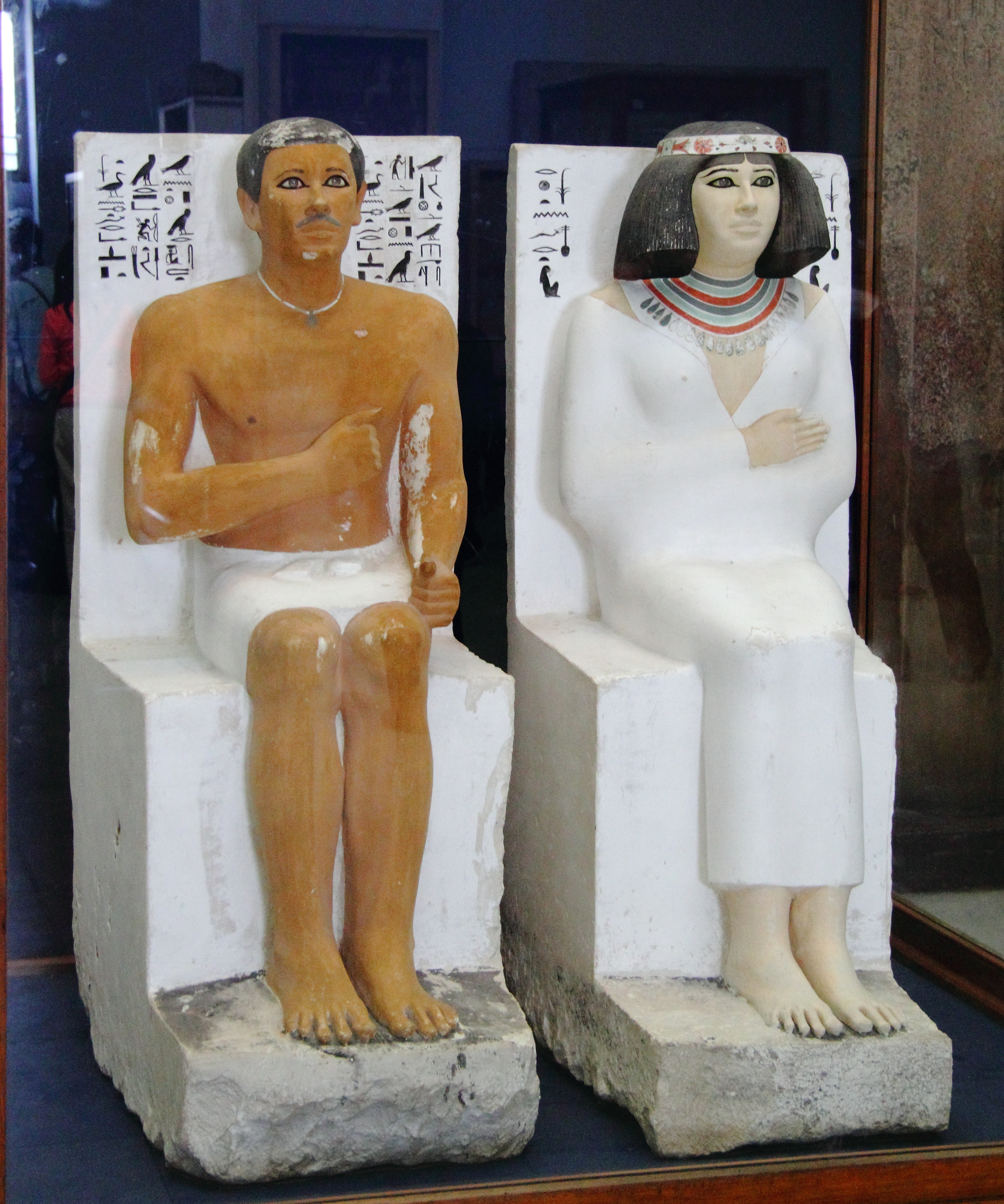
(Statue 1 + 2)
the pair: Ra-hotep and Nofret

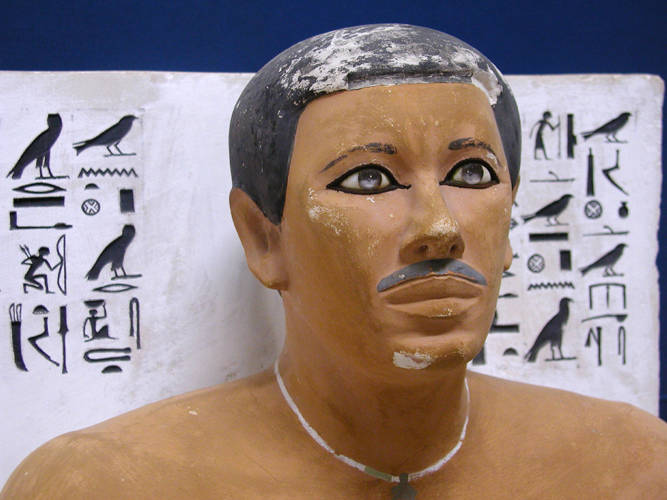
Ra-hotep
r a R4 t p

== Philately and numismatics ==
Nofret is depicted on Egyptian stamps of 1958, 1989, and 2000 (the cost is 20 PT.; No. 1669) and on the Fujairah stamp of 1966 (pair statue).

The watermark of the E£20 banknote depicts the head of a sculptural image of Nofret.
