= Meresankh (given name) =

U6 S29 S34
Meresankh III
in hieroglyphs
Era: Old Kingdom
(2686–2181 BC)

Meresankh is the name of several royal women from the Old Kingdom in Ancient Egypt. It means "she loves life" and was popular during the 4th dynasty.

- Meresankh, wife of Raherka
- Meresankh I, mother of the 4th dynasty King Sneferu
- Meresankh, daughter of Prince Kanefer, son of Sneferu
- Meresankh II, daughter of Khufu and Meritites I, married to her half-brother Horbaef, later wife of Djedefre or Khafre
- Meresankh III, daughter of Hetepheres II and Kawab, married to Pharaoh Khafre
- Meresankh IV, queen of Egypt towards the end of the 5th dynasty
