= Djaty =

Prince of Egypt during the 4th Dynasty

U28 t A i i
ḏꜣty
- Resting place: Mastaba G 7810, Giza
- Years active: c. 2550 BC
- Children: Djaty II
- Parent: Possibly Meresankh II

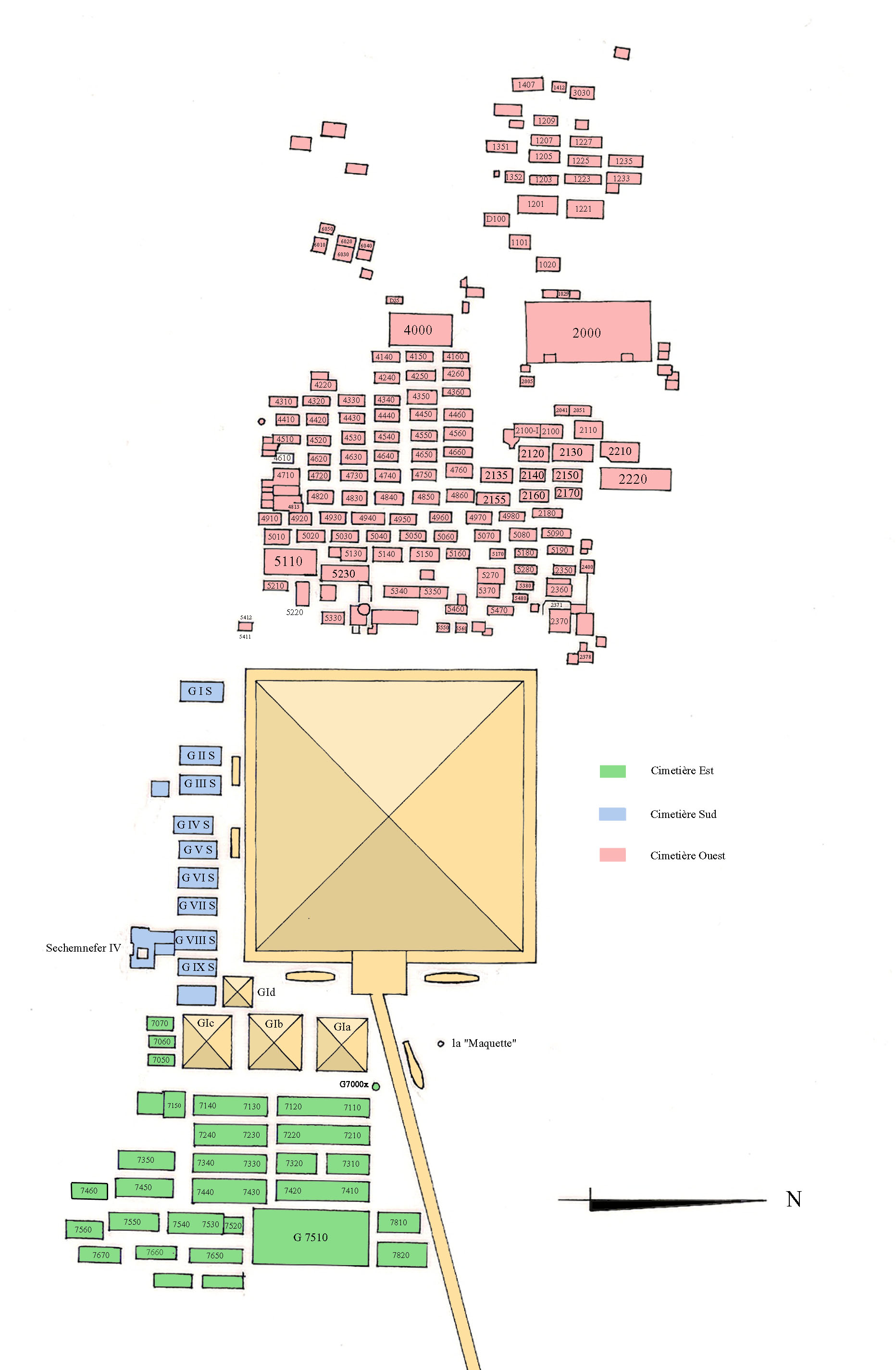
Tomb of Djaty is located near the east side(depicted in green) compared to the Great Pyramid of Giza as shown in the centre of the picture.

Djaty I (also Djati; fl. c. 2550 BC) was an ancient Egyptian prince during the 4th Dynasty. He was an overseer of a royal expedition.

Djaty may have been the son of Queen Meresankh II, the daughter of King Khufu. Djaty's sisters were Nefertkau III and Nebty-tepites.

Because Djaty had the title King's son of his body (za-nesut khetef, zꜣ-nswt ẖt.f), it is assumed he was the son of one king. It is known that Meresankh II married a king after the death of her first husband Horbaef. This king would be a father of Djaty – either Djedefre or Khafre. However, Djaty maybe had his title because he was a grandson of Khufu.

Djaty was married and had a son Djaty II. It is possible that he had more sons.

After his death, Djaty was buried in the tomb known as G 7810. This is a mastaba at Giza. In the tomb, his wife and son are depicted. Djaty II is described as the eldest son of Djaty I.

== See also ==
- Egyptian Fourth Dynasty family tree
