= Iynefer =

Iynefer can refer to:

- Iynefer I, an Egyptian prince of the Fourth Dynasty, son of Sneferu
- Iynefer II, an Egyptian prince of the Fourth Dynasty, son of Khufu
