= Nebty-tepites =

G16 tp it a
- Princess of Egypt
- Father: Possibly Horbaef
- Mother: Possibly Meresankh II

Nebty-tepites (nb.tỉ tp ỉt=s, "The two crowns on the head of her father"; fl. c. 2550 BC) was a princess of ancient Egypt. She is mentioned in the tomb of her mother, Meresankh II.

== Biography ==
Nebty-tepites may have been a daughter of Prince Horbaef and his half-sister Meresankh II. She had a sister Nefertkau III and a brother Djaty. After Horbaef's death, Meresankh married a King, either Djedefra or Khafre and became a queen consort. So, Nebty-tepites was a niece and step-daughter of her mother's second husband.
