= Meresankh II =

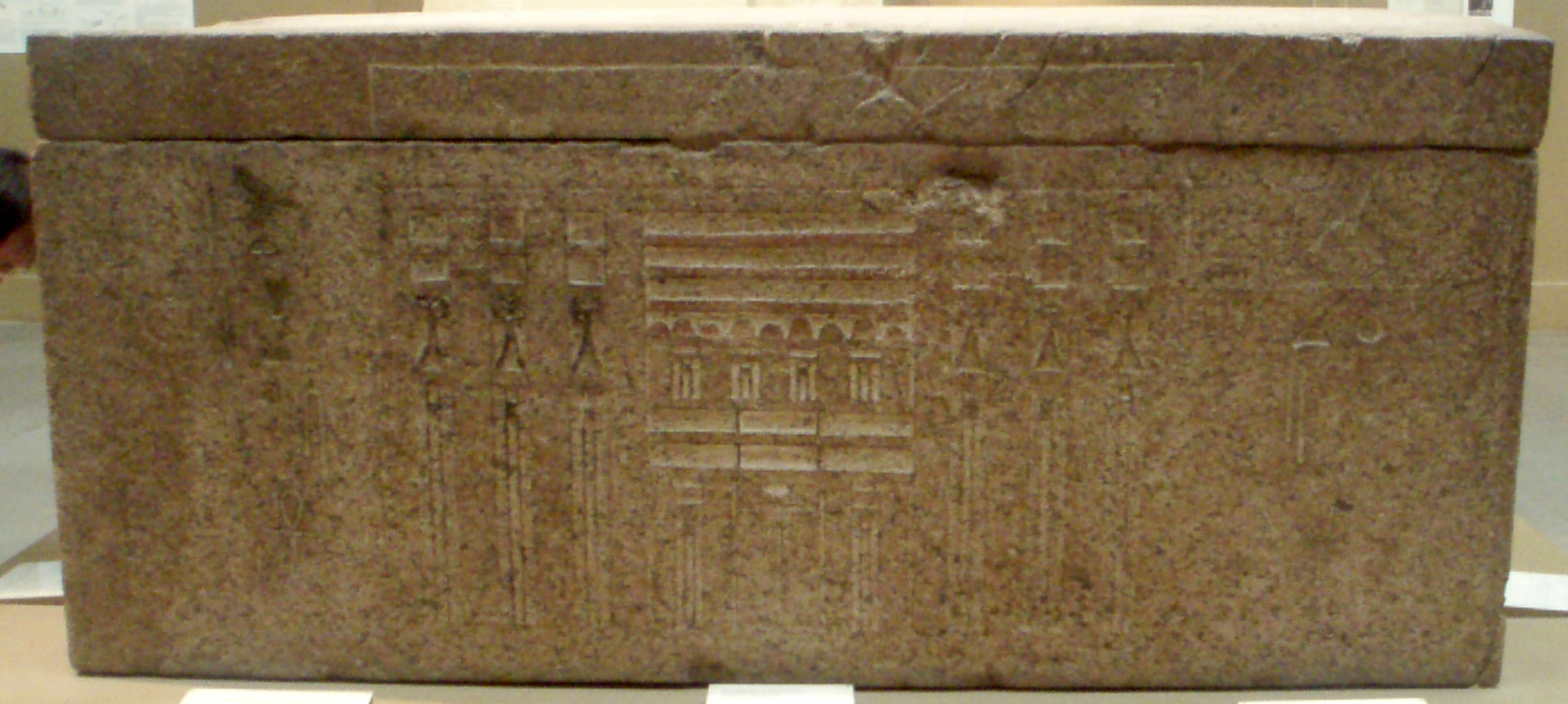
- Meresankh II's sarcophagus

Queen consort of Egypt
- Tenure: c. 2550 BC
- Burial: mastaba G 7410-7420, Giza
- Spouse(s): Possibly Horbaef
- Issue: Possibly Nefertkau III; Possibly Nebty-tepites; Possibly Djaty
- Father: Possibly Khufu
- Mother: Possibly Meritites I
- Religion: Ancient Egyptian religion

Meresankh II ("She Loves Life"; fl. c. 2550 BC) was a queen consort of Egypt who lived during the 4th Dynasty.

== Family ==
Meresankh II's parents are assumed to be King Khufu and Queen Meritites I given that they are mentioned in Meresankh's mastaba. She is never explicitly called their daughter however. Assuming Meresankh's filiation as stated, this would make Meresankh II a sister of Prince Kawab and Queen Hetepheres II. She was also a sister of Princess Meritites II who was later married to the Palace Director Akhethotep (Akhtihotep). Meresankh II shares her name with her great-grandmother Meresankh I, mother of Sneferu. Meresankh III was a niece of Meresankh II.

It is assumed that Meresankh II married her half-brother Horbaef and they had children named Djaty, Nefertkau III, and Nebty-tepites.

- Prince Djaty U29 t A i i His titles: King's son of his body, Overseer of the expedition. His tomb is mastaba G 7810. The tomb may date to the end of the 4th dynasty or even the beginning of the 5th dynasty.
- Princess Nefertkau III nfr t kA w Buried in mastaba G 7820 with her husband Iynefer II.i i nfr The mastaba dates to the end of the 4th dynasty or even the beginning of the 5th dynasty.
- Princess Nebty-tepites G16 tp it a A daughter mentioned in Meresankh's tomb.

Meresankh II has the titles of a queen and it is usually assumed that her husband Horbaf died and that Meresankh remarried one of the subsequent kings. It is possible that she married her half-brother Djedefre, but it is also possible she married Khafre.

== Titles ==
The titles of Meresankh II include:

- Great one of the hetes-sceptre (weret-hetes, wrt-ḥts)
- She who sees Horus and Seth (maat-hor-setekh, mꜣꜣt-ḥrw-stẖ)
- King's Wife (hemet-nesut, ḥmt-nswt)
- Attendant of Horus (khet-hor, ḫt-ḥr)
- King's Daughter of his body (zat-nesut-net-khetef, zꜣt nswt-nt-ẖt.f)

== Tomb and burial ==
Meresankh II was buried in a double mastaba G 7410–7420 with her first husband Horbaef. The tomb was excavated by George Reisner. Meresankh was buried in a shaft (G 7410B) with two rooms. Horbaef was buried in shaft G 7420A.

Meresankh's sarcophagus was found and removed during the 1927 excavations and is now in the Museum of Fine Arts, Boston. The sarcophagus is made of red granite and is inscribed on all four sides. The photograph provided by the BMFA shows a rectangular sarcophagus. The side shown is decorated with a facade of a palace. In the center the doors to the palace are shown. To the left of the palace facade is the inscription "King's Daughter of his body, Meresankh" (zȝt nsw n ẖt=f mr.s ˤnḫ) on the right there is an inscription identifying the lady as [...] "Horus, King's Wife Meresankh". The sarcophagus of Meresankh is decorated with an Anubis-jackal on the lid and offering-lists on ends.

== See also ==
- Egyptian Fourth Dynasty Family Tree
