= Minkhaf I =

Egyptian prince

- Prince of Egypt; Vizier of Egypt
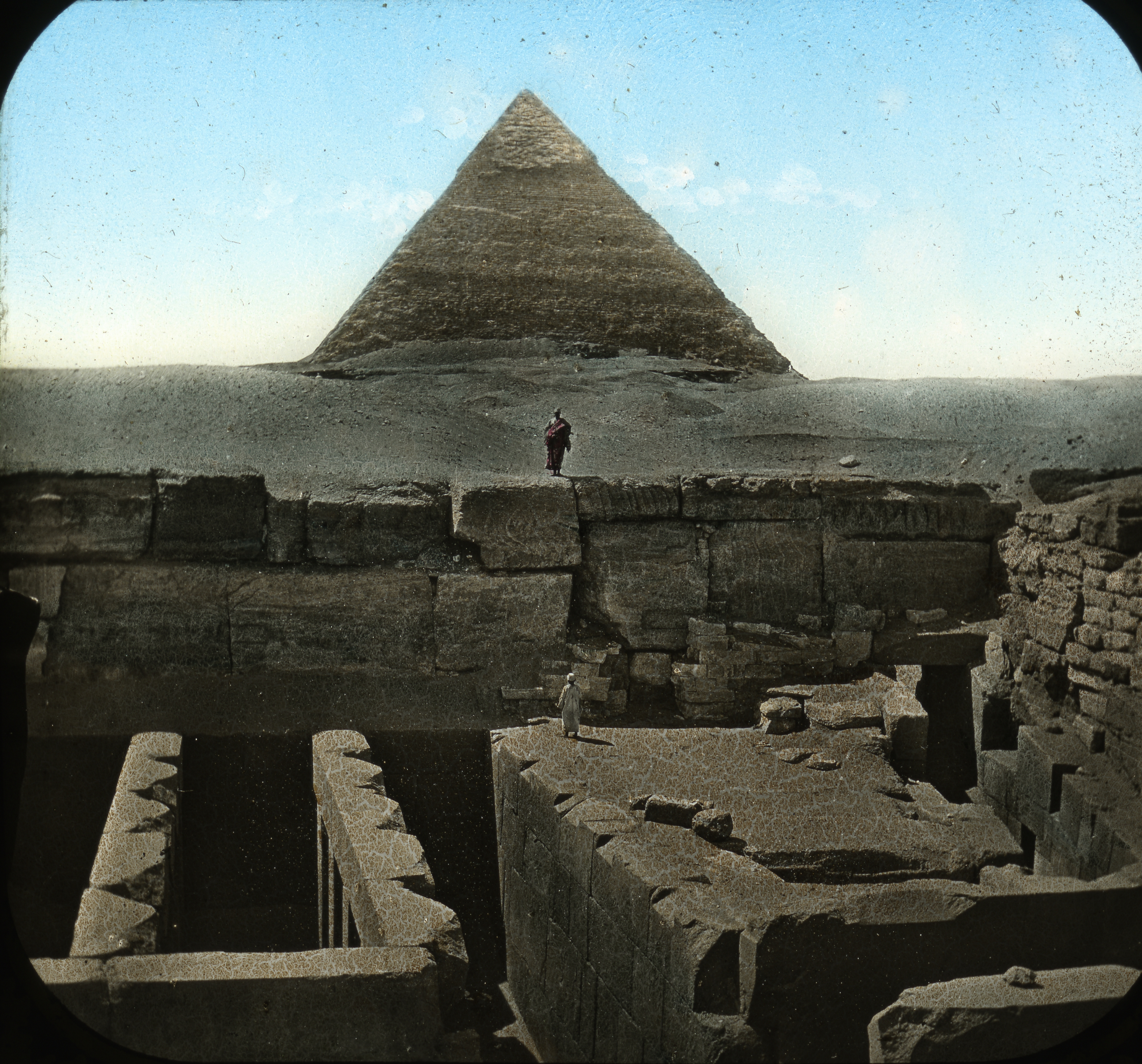
Egyptian name
R23 xa fMinkhaf
Mn.w ḫˁ=f
He appears, the god Min
- Dynasty: 4th Dynasty
- Pharaoh: Khufu
- Spouse: unknown woman
- Father: Khufu
- Mother: possibly Henutsen
- Children: Son

Minkhaf I was an ancient Egyptian prince of the 4th Dynasty. He was a son of Pharaoh Khufu, half-brother of Pharaoh Djedefre and elder brother of Pharaoh Khafre. His mother may have been Queen Henutsen. Minkhaf had a wife and at least one son, but their names are not known. Minkhaf served as vizier possibly under Khufu or Khafre.

== Tomb ==
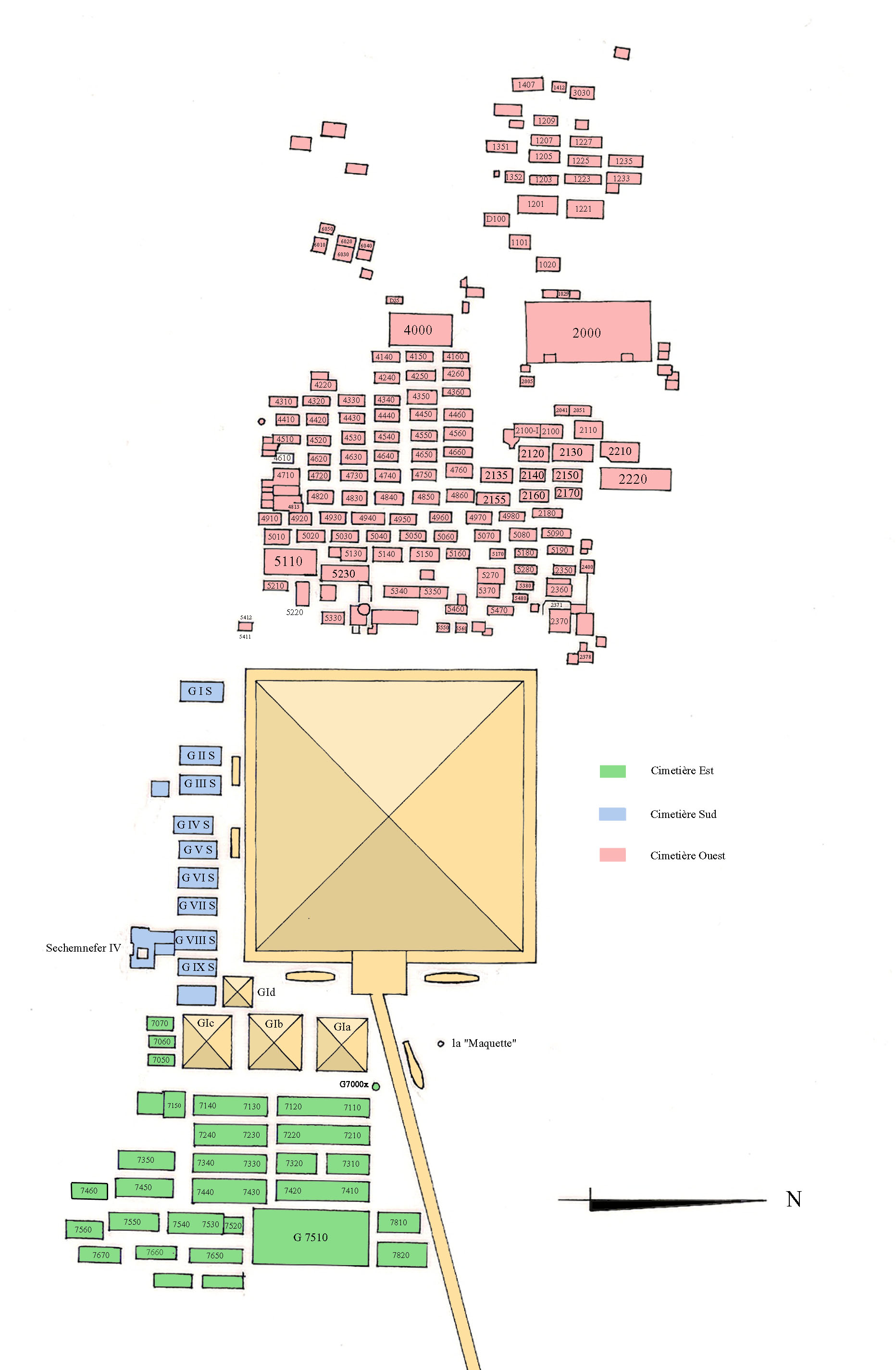
Tomb of Minkhaf is located near the east side(depicted in green) compared to the Great Pyramid of Giza as shown in the centre of the picture.

Minkhaf was buried in the double mastaba numbered G 7430-7440 in the East Field, which is part of the Giza Necropolis. The construction of the mastaba started during the reign of his father Khufu. The mastaba contained an interior chapel and an exterior chapel consisting of four rooms. One of the rooms was built to house at least four statues. The niches were large enough to hold standing statues and the niches were inscribed with Minkhaf's name and titles.

Two burial shafts were found, labeled G 7430 A and G 7430 B. Shaft G 7430 A contained Minkhaf's sarcophagus which was found in a coffin pit located on the western side of the burial chamber. A canopic pit where the Canopic jars would have been stored was located in the south-east corner of the burial chamber. Shaft G 7430 B belonged to Minkhaf's wife, but the structure was unfinished and appears to not have been used. Minkhaf's sarcophagus is now in the Egyptian Museum in Cairo.
