= Iynefer I =

Ancient Egyptian prince

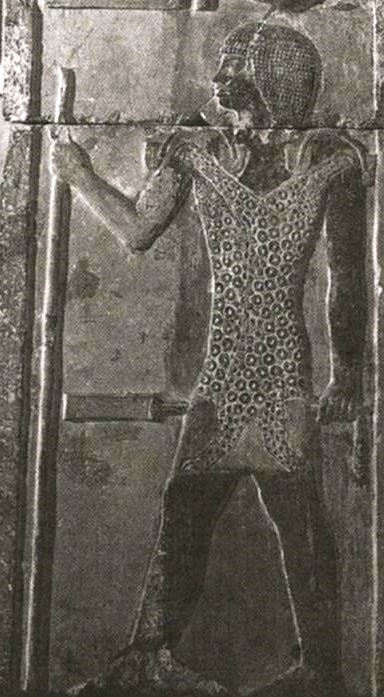
An offering niche of Iynefer from Dahshur, now in Egyptian Museum

Iynefer (i(i)-nfr, “the beautiful/good one has come”) was a Fourth Dynasty ancient Egyptian prince, a son of Pharaoh Sneferu. He was thus a brother of Nefertkau I and Khufu and his title was “King’s Son”.

Iynefer had a tomb in Dahshur, and parts of the tomb are now located in the Egyptian Museum. In contrast with the wish of nobles in the Third Dynasty, many nobles during Sneferu’s time appear in relief with a particularly youthful and pleasant demeanor, and Iynefer is one of them.

== See also ==
- Iynefer II, his nephew
