= Wepemnofret =

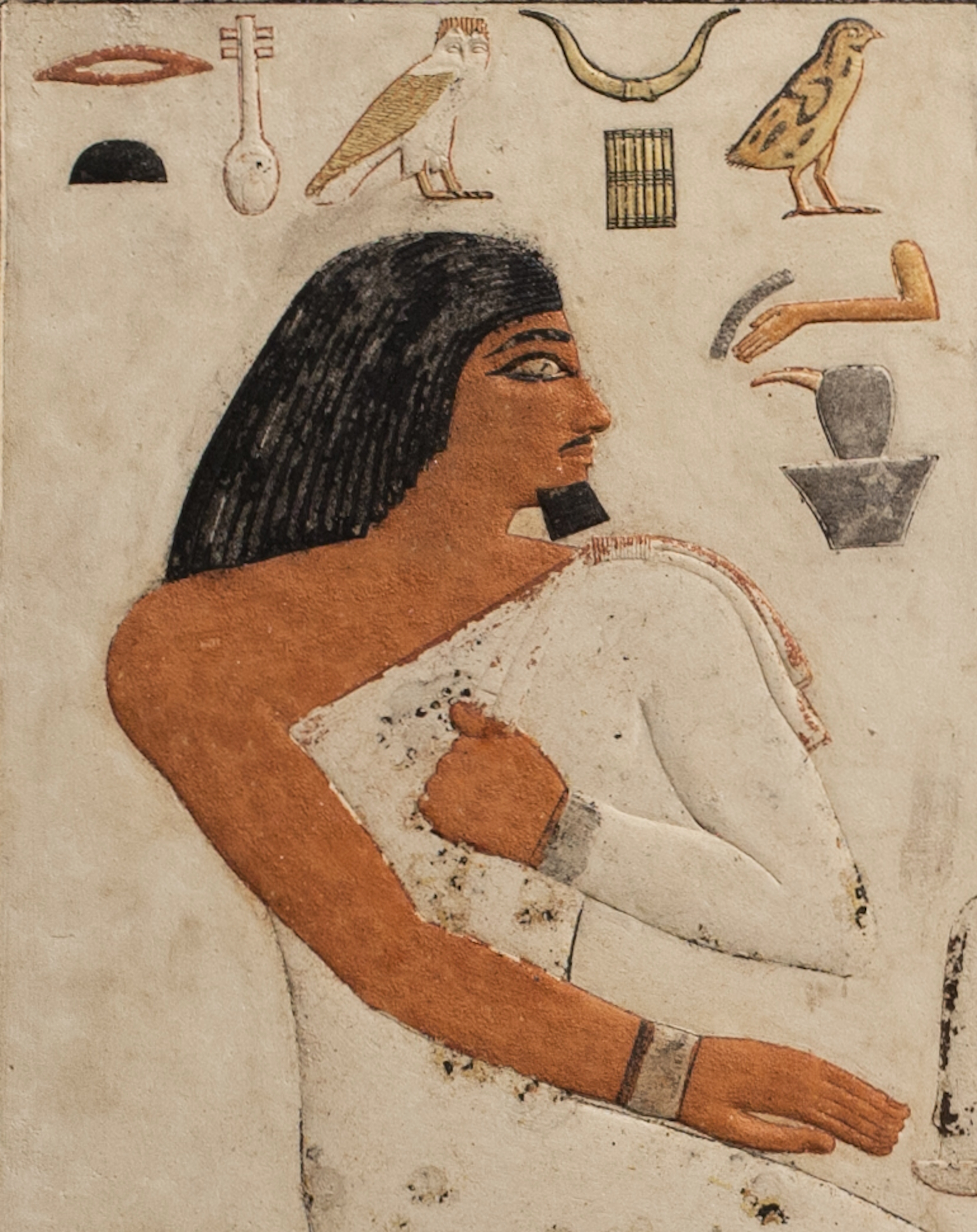
- Wepemnefret from the stela of his Tomb G 1201
- Burial place: Egypt
- Parent: Khufu

Wepemnofret was a Royal prince of the Fourth Dynasty (died c. 2589 – c. 2580). His father was Khufu, and mother unknown. A stela embedded in the wall of his tomb was found near the Great Pyramid of Giza, in the Giza West Field. The stele was discovered by the Hearst Expedition in 1905, and is considered to be the turning point between two artistic styles: the Archaic Style of the Fertile Period, and the Mature Style of the 4th Dynasty.

His mastaba G 1201 is the earliest among the mastabas of Cemetery 1200. His stela has archaic features. The tomb can be dated to the early years of the reign of Khufu (that is, c. 2589 – c. 2580).

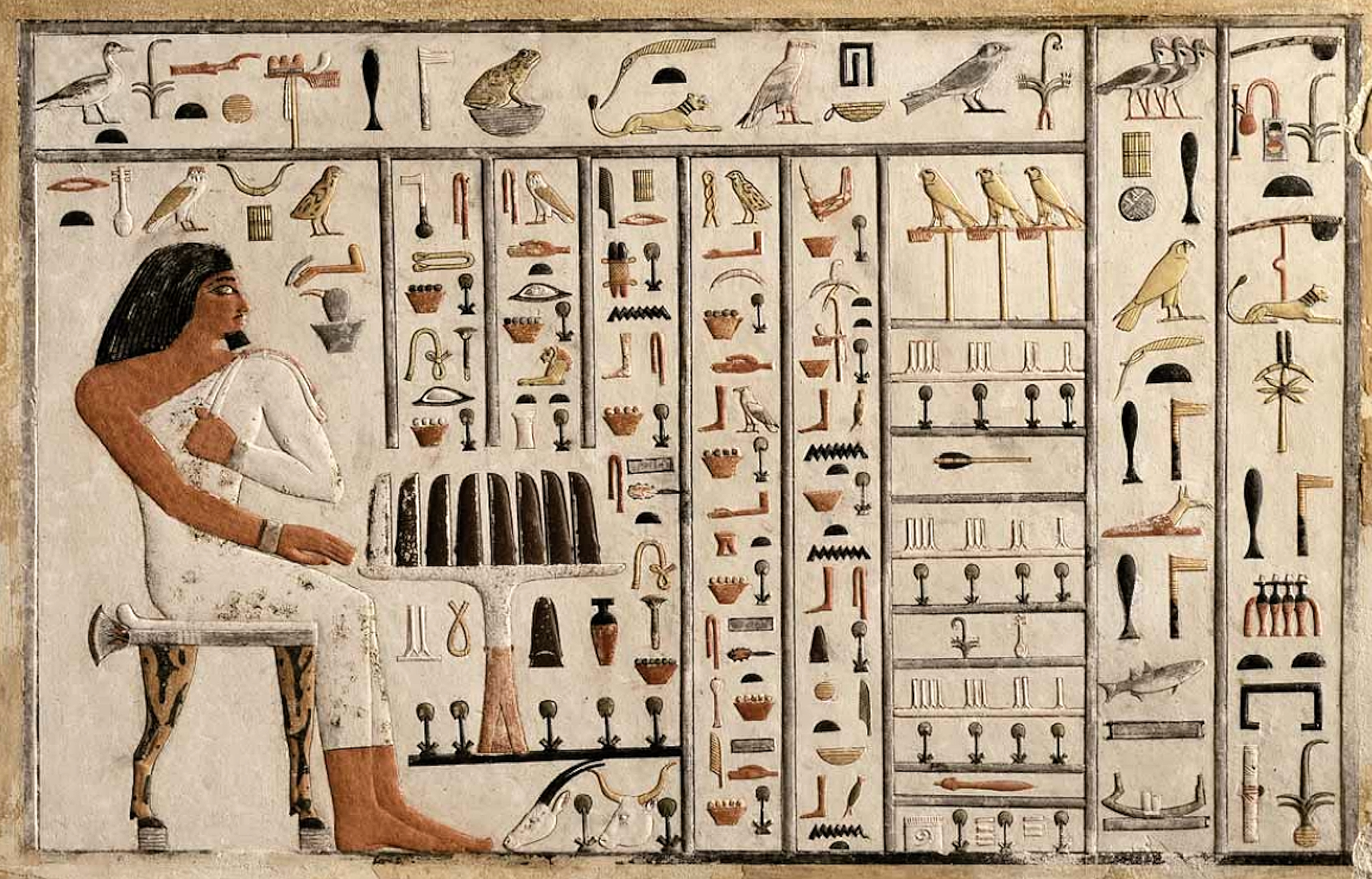
Stela of Wepemnefret, Tomb G 1201.
