= Iynefer II =

Ancient Egyptian prince

Iynefer II ("the beautiful one has come"; the name is also spelled as Iy-nefer) was an ancient Egyptian prince, likely a son of Pharaoh Khufu. He was named after his uncle Iynefer I. Iynefer II’s wife was Nefertkau III; she was likely his niece, and they had one son (or two sons) and one daughter, Nefertkau. Both Iynefer and his wife are buried in the mastaba G 7820 at Giza.

A large, open eye is characteristic of the decoration of Iynefer II’s mastaba.
