= Horbaef =

H Hr r bA f
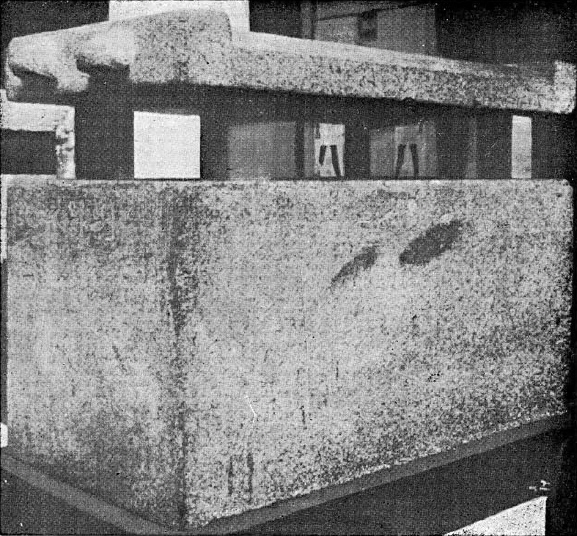
- Horbaef CG 1788
- Born: probably Memphis, Egypt
- Burial: mastaba G 7410-7420 at Giza
- Consort: Possibly Meresankh II
- Issue: Possibly Nebty-tepites
- Father: Khufu
- Religion: Ancient Egyptian religion

Horbaef (also known as Baefhor and Horbaf; fl. c. 2570 BC) was an ancient Egyptian prince of the 4th Dynasty. His title was "King’s son".

Horbaef was a son of King Khufu and an unknown woman. It is assumed he married his half-sister Meresankh II, and had 1 daughter, Nebty-tepites. They may have also had an additional daughter, Nefertkau III and a son called Djaty. After Horbaef’s death, his widow Meresankh married a king, her other half-brother, either Djedefre or Khafre, and thus she became a queen consort. It’s possible that Djaty was a son of Meresankh’s second husband because he had a title "king’s son of his body", and Horbaef was a prince but never a king.

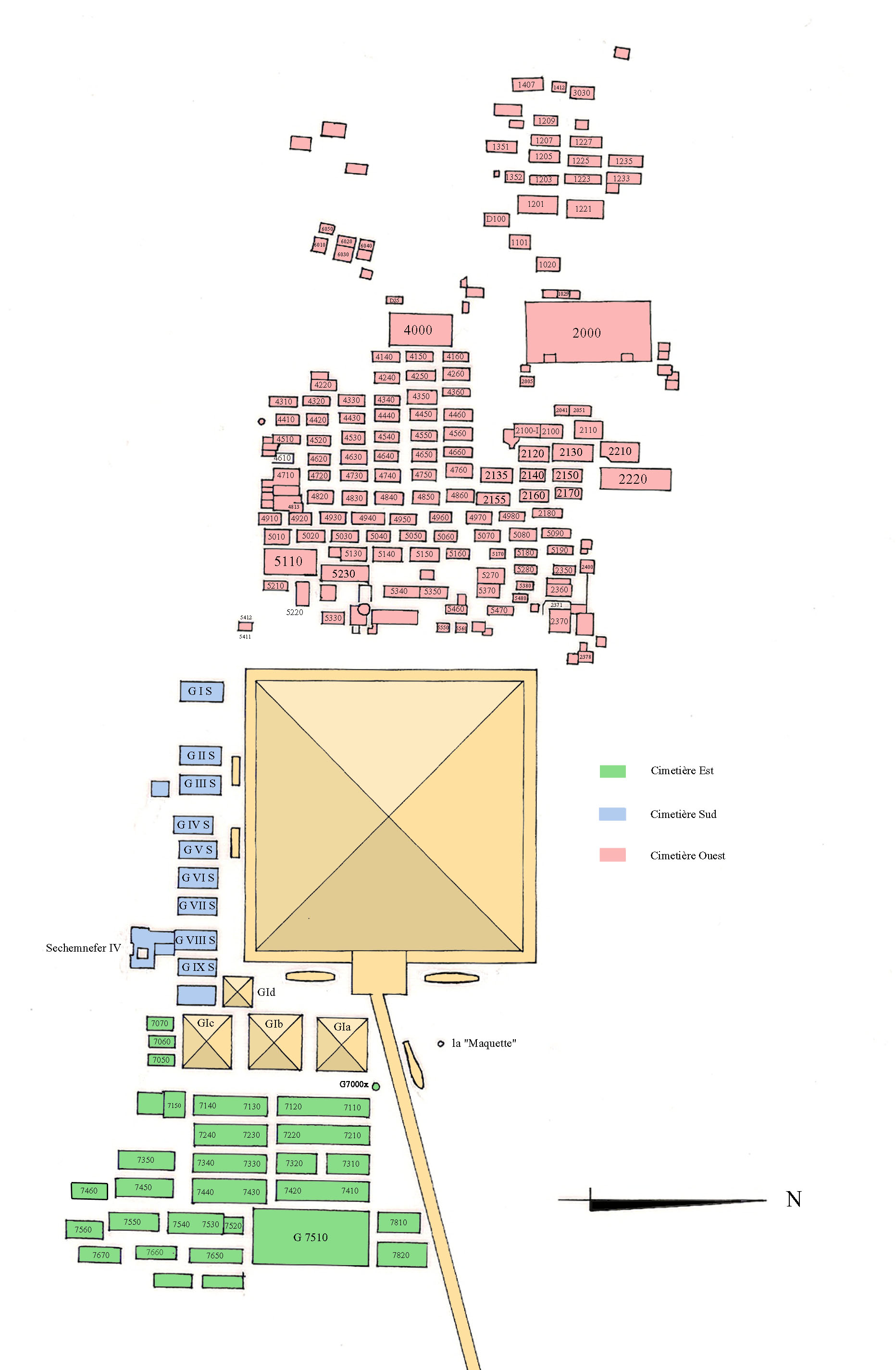
Tomb of Horbaef is located near the east side(depicted in green) compared to the Great Pyramid of Giza as shown in the centre of the picture.

Horbaef was buried in the mastaba G 7410-7420 at Giza. Meresankh was also buried there.
