= Meritites II =

Nefertkau I
mr r t t f s
Mrj.t jt=s
- Burial place: Giza, Giza Governorate, Egypt
- Years active: c. 2550 BC
- Spouse: Akhethotep

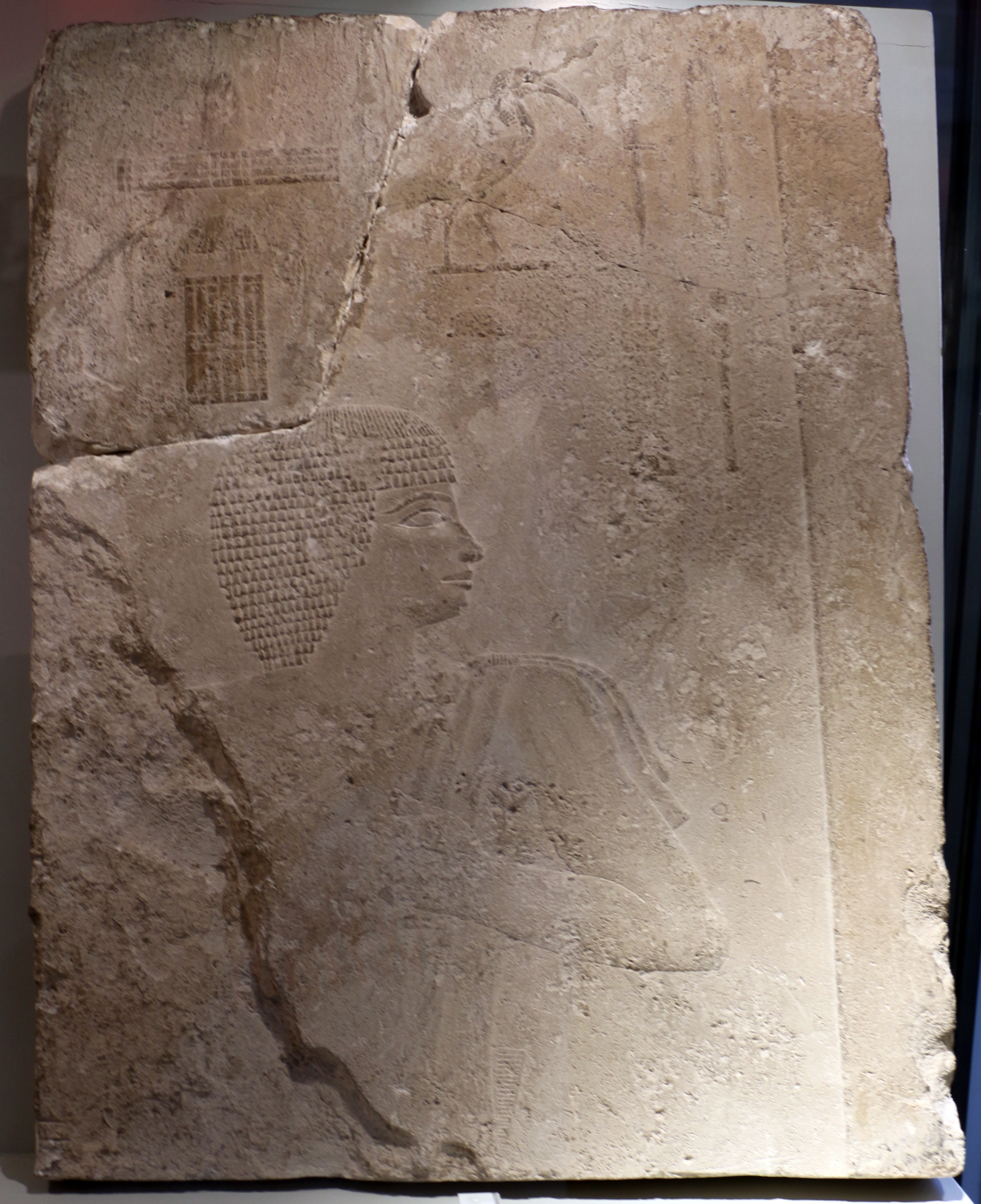
Relief depicting Meritites' husband Akhethotep, from their mastaba G 7650, and now in the Museo Barracco, Rome (Inv. No. MB 3)

Meritites II (Merytytes, Meritetes, Meretites, Merytiotes, Mertiotes, or Meritites A ("beloved of her father"; fl. c. 2550 BC) was a 4th Dynasty princess of ancient Egypt, probably a daughter of King Khufu. She may have been a daughter of Meritites I based on the fact that this queen is mentioned in mastaba G 7650. She married the Director of the Palace, Akhethotep (a non-royal court official), and she had several children with her husband. Meritites and her husband shared a mastaba G 7650 in Giza.

== Family and early life ==
Meritites II was probably a daughter of Khufu, as she was said to be a King's daughter of his body and as the location of her tomb indicates a relation to Khufu. She was a Prophetess of Khufu, Hathor, and Neith.

Meritites was married to Akhethotep, who was a director of the palace. Further titles of Akhethotep include Sole friend, Priest of the Bas of Nekhen, and Overseer of fishers/ fowlers. In the tomb, several children are depicted. A block formerly in the McGregor collection, but now in the Calouste Gulbenkian Museum in Lisbon (Inv. No. 159) shows two daughters. One daughter is named Hetepheres and only a partial name has been preserved for the second girl: Khufu[...].

== Burial ==
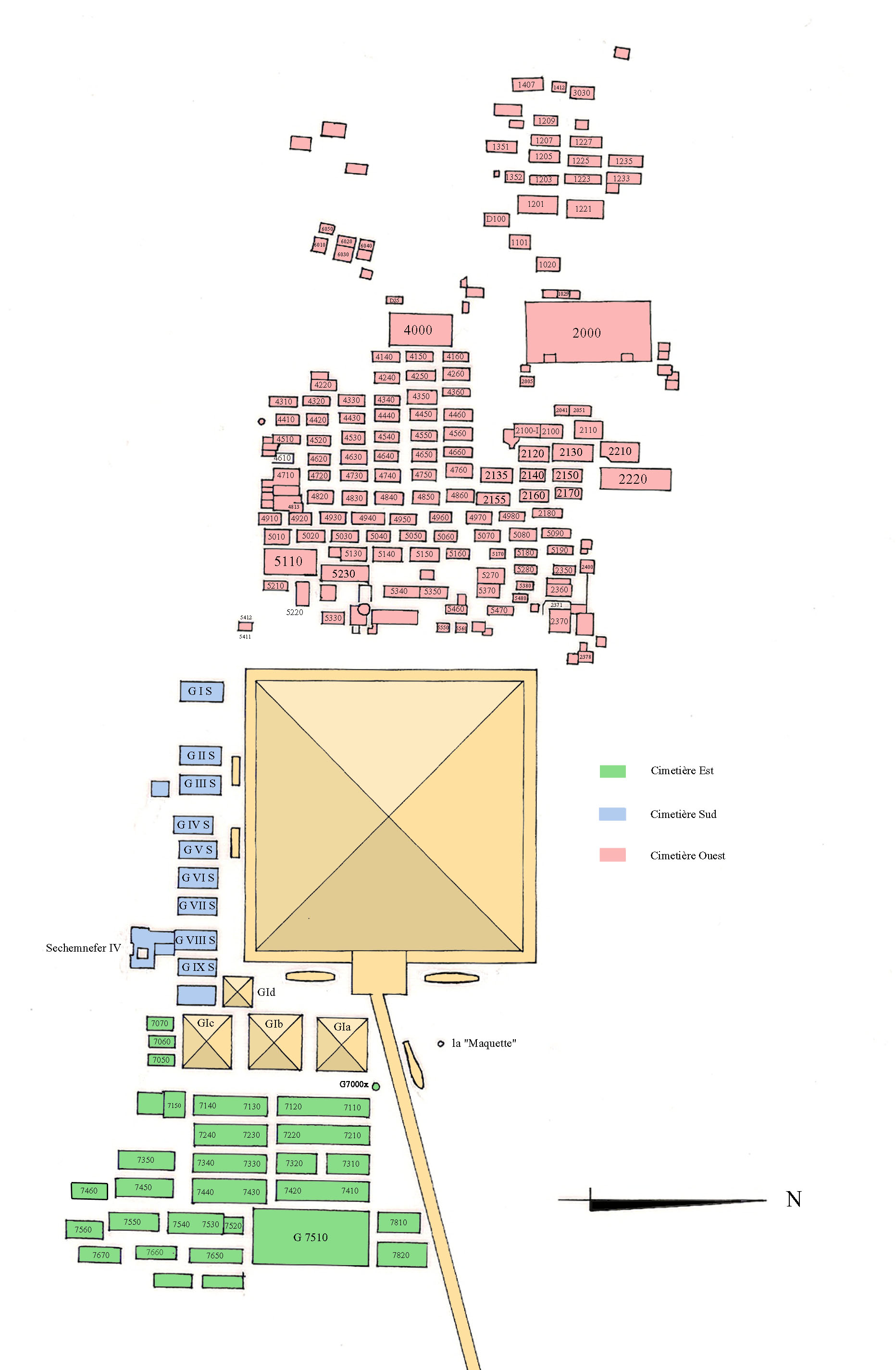
Tomb of Meritites is located near the east side(depicted in green) compared to the Great Pyramid of Giza as shown in the centre of the picture.

Akhethotep and Meritites were buried at Giza in tomb G 7650. The mastaba is stone built and the interior offering room is decorated. Akhethotep is depicted with his wife Meritites and attendants in some of the scenes. In one scene, Akhethotep is accompanied by two daughters. A red granite sarcophagus with a palace facade was discovered in shaft C, now Brooklyn Museum, New York City (Inv. No. 48.110).
