= Fourth Dynasty of Egypt family tree =

Family tree of ancient Egyptian rulers

Family tree of the Fourth Dynasty of Egypt, ruling ancient Egypt in the 27th century BCE to the 25th century BCE.

== Chart ==
Third Dynasty	Third Dynasty
Meresankh I
Hetepheres I	Sneferu	?
Meritites I	Khufu	Henutsen	Rahotep	Nefermaat I	Itet
Djedefhor	Meresankh II	Kawab	Hetepheres II	Djedefre	Khentetka	Khafre	Khamerernebty I	Hemiunu
Setka	Baka	Neferhetepes	Hernet	Menkaura	Khamerernebty II
?
Shepseskaf	Bunefer
Fifth Dynasty
Neferhetepes	Userkaf	Khentkaus I	Djedefptah	Khamaat
