= Nefertkau III =

nfr r&t D28 D28 D28
Nfr.t kau
- Husband: Iynefer II
- Issue: Nefertkau two or three sons

Nefertkau III was an ancient Egyptian princess. She lived during the 4th Dynasty. She was possibly a daughter of Meresankh II and Horbaef. If so, she was a granddaughter of King Khufu. Baud has proposed that Nefertkau was a daughter of Khufu instead. Nefertkau has the titles King's daughter of his body and Priestess of Neith in a scene in the chapel of her tomb. She was married to an official named Iynefer. Nefertkau and Iynefer had a daughter also called Nefertkau and two or three sons. Strudwick has suggested that Iynefer may be a son of Khufu. Depending on the interpretation of the family relationships, Nefertkau may have married either her uncle or her brother.

== Tomb ==
Nefertkau and Iynefer were buried in G 7820 which is part of a double mastaba. The tomb is located in the east field which is part of the Giza Necropolis.

=== Chapel ===
Scenes show Nefertkau and her husband. In one scene a small girl is shown between her parents. She is called "their daughter Nefertkau". In the same scene a small boy appears before his father, but no name is recorded. In another scene two small boys and a slightly larger man are depicted with Iynefer. The two small boys are sons, the larger figure may be a depiction of their eldest son.

=== Burial shafts ===
Two burial shafts were constructed. The husband is thought to have been buried in the shaft labeled G 7820A, while Nefertkau was likely buried in shaft G 7820B. In G 7820A, no traces of a coffin were found, and there was no canopic pit or recess. In G 7820B, no traces of a coffin were found either, but there was a canopic pit in the southeast corner of the burial chamber.
