= Ubaoner =

Fictitious ancient Egyptian magician

Ubaoner in hieroglyphs
U26 b G29 G1 Y1 i N35 r O39 A1
Ubaoner (Uba-iner)
Wb3-jnr
he who splits stone

Ubaoner is the name of a fictitious ancient Egyptian magician appearing in the second chapter of a story told in the legendary Westcar Papyrus. He is said to have worked wonders during the reign of king (pharaoh) Nebka (3rd dynasty).

== The literary person ==
Ubaoner appears only in the second story of the Westcar Papyrus – there is no archeological or historical evidence that he existed. Nevertheless, he is an object of great interest for Egyptologists, since his magical trick is connected to later cultural perceptions of the personality of king Nebka. In the story, Ubaoner is described as a high lector priest.

== The wonder of Ubaoner ==
According to the Westcar Papyrus, Ubaoner is betrayed by his own wife several times. She secretly loves a commoner who resides at Memphis and sends him expensive clothes and other material. The commoner comes to visit Ubaoner's wife and says to her: “Isn't there a pavilion at the lake?” The wife says: “See, let's spend some time in there.” She calls for Ubaoner's caretaker and orders him: “Prepare the pavilion with all good things.” And so Ubaoner's wife and the commoner spend their time in the pavilion drinking together, until they were finished. Later that evening the commoner is picked up by his maidservant, who was waiting at the lake. Ubaoner's caretaker was waiting there, too and he says to himself: “I will go to Ubaoner.” Two days later the caretaker tells everything to Ubaoner and makes the comment: “See, it was your wife who spent a day in your pavilion; she was together with that commoner you know. It was adultery what he did, two times, at your lake.” Thereupon, Ubaoner says to the caretaker: “Bring me a pair of [...] made of ebony and dja'am. I will create [...] and send it as a harbinger.” He creates a small figurine of wax in the shape of a crocodile with a length of seven fingers. He bewitches the figurine and gives it to his caretaker with the words: “When he comes to purify himself in the lake, this commoner, then you may throw this crocodile made of wax after him.” The caretaker does as ordered and waits until the next day. The next morning Ubaoner's wife orders the caretaker: “Let the pavilion at the lake be prepared, for I will sit in it.” Thereupon she spends the whole day in the pavilion together with the commoner. Later that evening the commoner leaves the pavilion to take a bath in the lake. The caretaker quickly throws the wax figurine after the stranger and when the idol touches the water it becomes a real, living crocodile 3.70m in length. The animal devours the commoner and disappears in the depths of the lake for seven days. During these seven days Ubaoner is received by pharaoh Nebka for an important audience. After the audience Ubaoner invites Nebka to visit his house with the words: “May thy majesty proceed and see the wonder that has happened in the time of thy majesty [...] a commoner.”. Nebka and Ubaoner walk to the lake where Ubaoner orders the crocodile to come out of the water and to release the commoner. When king Nebka sees that he says: “This crocodile is dangerous!” But Ubaoner bends down and touches the crocodile and immediately it becomes a figurine of wax again. Then Ubaoner gives a report to Nebka about the affairs. Nebka tells the crocodile: “Take away what is yours!” and the animal grabs the commoner and then disappears. The wife of Ubaoner is brought to Nebka, too and the pharaoh sentence her to death. She is brought to a place east of the palace and burnt alive. Her ash is thrown into the Nile.

== Modern analysis ==
Adolf Erman and Kurt Heinrich Sethe once considered the stories of Westcar Papyrus as mere folklore. They saw literary figures like Djadjaemankh and the other heroes of the Westcar Papyrus as a pure fiction, created only for entertainment, since there is no archaeological evidence of them.

Modern Egyptologists like Verena Lepper and Miriam Lichtheim deny this view and argue, that Sethe and Erman may have just failed to see the profundity of such novels. They hold that the story of Ubaoner describes a classical case of adultery through the wife and a typical sort of punishment for that during the Old Kingdom (in this case it is the death penalty). Furthermore, it throws a positive light on the personality of king Nebka. The king is depicted as a strict but lawful judge; he punishes mischief and unethical behavior, in this case the betrayal of Ubaoner's wife. Additionally, Lepper and Lichtheim point to multiple similar but somewhat later ancient Egyptian writings in which magicians perform very similar magic tricks. According to the Egyptologists, their stories are obviously inspired by the tale of Ubaoner. And since they show the same manner of speaking and equal picking up of quaint phrases as the Westcar Papyrus does, Lepper and Lichtheim hold that Ubaoner (and the other wise men from the same papyrus) must have been known to Egyptian authors for a long time.
