= Rededjet =

Fictitious ancient Egyptian woman

Rededjet in hieroglyphs
D21 D46 T12 Y1 R11 D46 X1 B1
Rededjet
rwḏdt

Rededjet (also read as Ruddedet) is the name of a fictitious ancient Egyptian woman appearing as the heroic character in a story told in the legendary Westcar Papyrus. She is said to have fulfilled a prophecy by giving birth to three future kings that was forecast during the reign of Khufu (Fourth Dynasty) by a magician named Dedi.

== Literary person ==
Rededjet appears only in the fifth story of the Westcar Papyrus; no archeological or historical evidence of her existence has been discovered. Nevertheless, she is object of great interest for historians and Egyptologists, since her story gives information about the line of succession at the very beginning of the Fifth Dynasty and two royal women.

== The wonder of Rededjet ==
According to the Westcar Papyrus, Rededjet has a strong labor, and birth is difficult because she has to deliver triplets. The god Ra, Lord of Sachebu, says to the deities Isis, Nephthys, Meskhenet, Heqet, and Khnum: “May you all go to Rededjet and release her from her trinity of children which are still in her womb and which will exercise their splendid office in the whole realm one day. So they can build temples for you, take care of your offering tables, let your drink plates thrive and multiply your god's sacrifices.” And so the goddesses turn to Rededjet's house after they had transformed themselves into music-making dancers. Khnum turns into a porter. When they reach Rededjet's house they meet her husband, Ra-User, outside at the threshold, wearing his skirt upside-down and whining. The goddesses show him their menits and sistrums. Thereupon Ra-User says: “See, there is a woman here who is suffering badly, for her birth is problematic.” The goddesses say: “May thou cause that we can see her. See, we know how to relieve.” Ra-User replies: “Feeds!” The deities step in and go immediately to Rededjet, who is lying upstairs. They seal the room and then Isis stands before Rededjet, to catch the babies, Nephthys takes position behind, whilst Heqet accelerates the birth. Now Isis says: “May you, the one who is User-Re-ef, be not too strong in her womb.” And the baby comes out quickly, a healthy child of one cubit in size. His bones are solid, his equipment of limbs being like gold. His headdress is made of real lapis lazuli. After cutting the umbilical cord, purifying the baby and placing it in a brick-made bed, covered with soft sheets, Khnum makes the body strong. Meskhenet steps by and says: “This is a king who will exercise the rulership over the whole country!” After this, Isis stands again before Rededjet and says: “May you, whose name is Sahure, stop kicking in her womb.” And this baby, too, comes out quickly. It has the same extraordinary appearance as the baby before. And again Meskhenet blesses the child with the words: “This is a king who will exercise the rulership over the whole country!” A third and last time Isis stands before Rededjet and says: “May you, whose name is Keku, stop being blind in her womb.” And the third baby is blessed by Meskhenet, too. Now the deities leave the room, meet Ra-User and say: “Oh joy! Three children were born to you!” Ra-User replies: “My ladies! What could I do for you? Give this barley to your porter, may you accept it as a gratuity, for making some beer.” Khnum shoulders the jars of barley and the deities start turning home. On their way, Isis admonishes her companions with the words: “Haven't we come here for a good reason? What would that reason be, if we perform no miracle to these children! There were nothing we could tell to their father who made us come.″ The deities create three lordly crowns for the children and hide them in the jars of barley. Then they conjure a downpour, as a reason to turn back to Ra-User's house. They say to Ra-User: “Please store the barley in a sealed storeroom for us until we come back from making music in the north.” And the jars with barley are locked in a storeroom.

Some weeks later, Rededjet asks her maidservant: “Is our house prepared with all good things?” The maidservant answers: “It is prepared with every good thing, except some jars of beer. They were not brought yet.” Rededjet inquires: “Why is this not so, that the jars with beer were brought?” And the maidservant says: “There is nothing you could produce it with, except the barley of those musicians, the barley that is stored and sealed away.” Rededjet orders: “Go and take some, Ra-User will replace it when he comes home.” And the maidservant opens the storeroom and all of a sudden she hears music, celebrations, and cheering from afar - its festive mood typical for a royal enthroning feast. The maid is baffled and tells everything to Rededjet. Rededjet enters the room too and also hears the festive noises. Now nosy she puts her ears on every box and jar, until she finds that the noises are coming from the jars of the musicians. Recognising the situation, Rededjet tells everything to Ra-User and they both spend the rest of the day celebrating.

One day Rededjet is bickering with the maidservant, who is punished with beating. Infuriated, the maidservant says: “Is it because of that? Is it really because of the three kings you gave birth to? I will go to file charges with the king of Lower- and Upper Egypt, Khufu, justified!” The maidservant leaves the house and goes to her elder brother. He is sitting beside his mother, binding flax and yarn. When he sees his sister, he says: “Where do ye go to, lil' sister?” And the maidservant tells him what she is up to. The brother says: “Shall it truly be done to come to me just to make me sup with betrayal?” He becomes angry and beats her, too. The maidservant now goes away to get some water and a crocodile snatches her. The brother goes to Rededjet to tell her what happened. Rededjet sits on the threshold, crying. The brother says: “What are you crying about, mistress?” Rededjet answers: “It's about this little girl that grew up in this house. Look, she went to go to file charges [...] to the king.” And the brother replies: “See, she came to me to tell [...] that I would go with her, but I beat her and sent her away. When she went off for some water a crocodile snatched her.”

== Modern analysis ==
Historians and Egyptologists such as Adolf Erman and Kurt Heinrich Sethe once thought the tales of the Westcar Papyrus were mere folklore, despite their knowledge of the historical correctness about the beginning of the fifth dynasty by describing the succession of the kings Userkaf, Sahure, and Neferirkare. They also thought the novel of the Westcar Papyrus to be unfinished.

Modern Egyptologists such as Verena Lepper and Miriam Lichtheim deny this view and they argue that Sethe and Erman may have just failed to see the profundity of the novel. They both evaluate the story as some kind of narrated moral that deals with the theme of justice and what happens to traitors. Lepper points out, that the story of Rededjet might have been inspired by the historical figure of Khentkaus I, who lived and may have ruled at the end of the Fourth dynasty. Khentkaus I is demonstrably entitled as "mother of two kings" and for a long time it has been thought that she may have borne Userkaf and Sahure. New evidence shows that at least Sahure had a different mother (Neferhetepes), the implication of the Westcar Papyrus that the first three kings of the Fifth Dynasty had been siblings, therefore seems incorrect. Since in the Westcar Papyrus Rededjet was concerned with the role of a future king's mother, the parallels between the biographies of the two ladies aroused special attention. The role of the maidservant is evaluated as being a key figure for a modern phrasing of indoctrinations about morality and betrayal. The maidservant wants to betray her mistress and is punished by destiny. Destiny is depicted here as a crocodile who snatches the traitor. The objective of the tale is to ensure the beginning of a new dynasty and by making the only danger disappear, the author of the Westcar Papyrus artfully creates some kind of happy ending. Lepper sees a strong clue in the way the story is finalized that the novel of the Westcar Papyrus ends here. The episode in which the crocodile snatches a traitor, is repeated several times, just as a refrain, which is a typical writing element used in ancient Egyptian documents to close a chapter or text.

== Archaeological basis ==
In 2009, archaeological discoveries in Abusir, the royal necropolis of the Fifth Dynasty, have established that Neferirkare was in fact Sahure's son (who was Userkaf's son). Egyptologists now believe that the story of Rededjet is based on a conflation of two historical royal women named Khentkaus. The first one, Khentkaus I, lived during the Fourth Dynasty and may have given birth to two kings, while the second one, Khentkaus II, was the mother of two Fifth Dynasty kings, Neferefre and Nyuserre Ini. The supposition is that when Nyuserre Ini was on the throne, he revived the cult of the Khentkaus I, as the similarities between both women provided him with a genealogical link relating him to his Fourth Dynasty forebears.

Egyptologist John Nolan believes that the mirroring position of the character in the story and association with the two royal women was emphasised so that Nyuserre Ini could legitimise his rule after the troubled times surrounding Neferefre's death. It could identify him with a third king inserted into what should become a legendary tale of prophecy, although that did not correlate with the historical records of each woman.
