= Fishnet =

Hosiery with an open, diamond-shaped knit

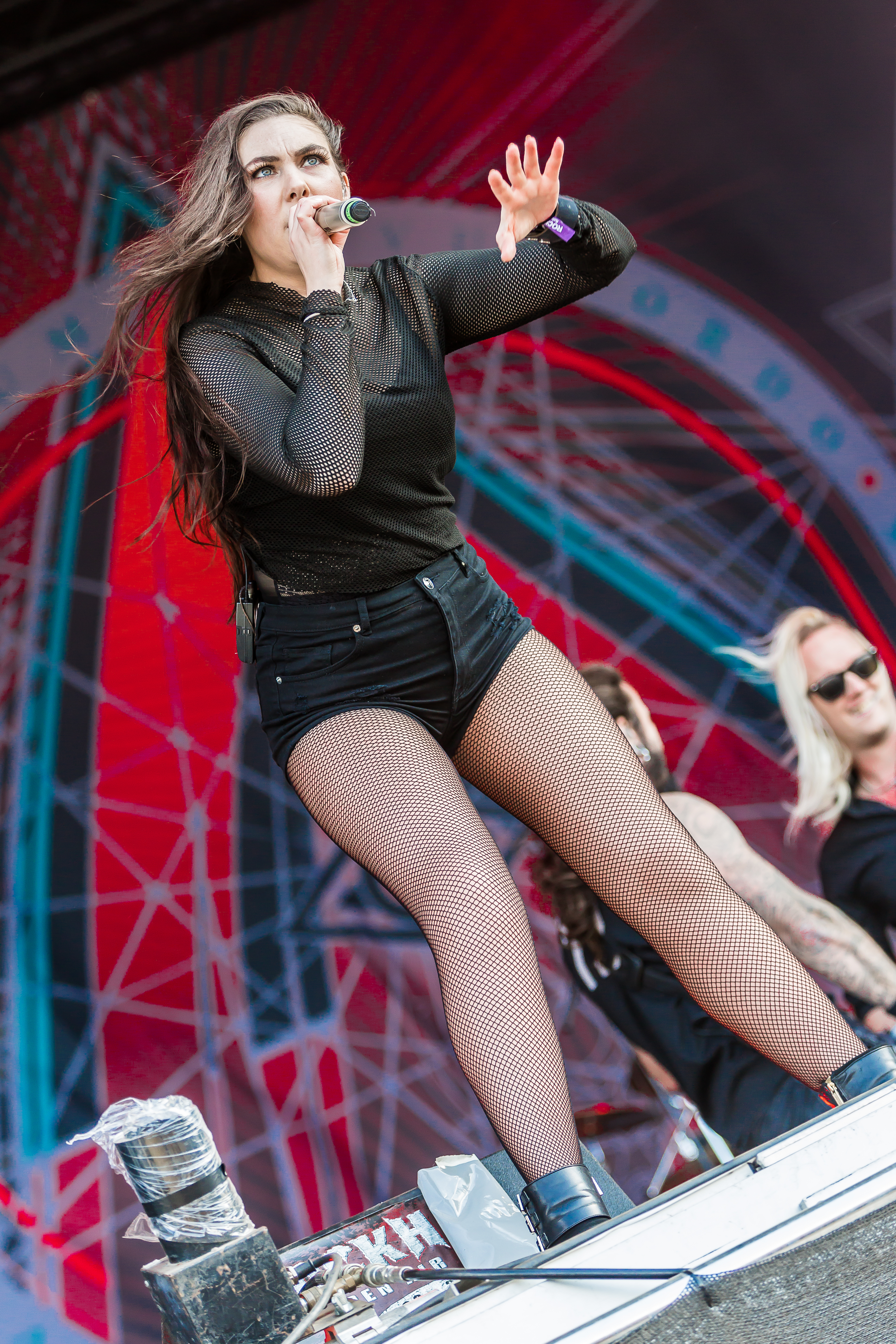
Elize Ryd wearing fishnet attire during a performance in 2018

In the field of textiles, fishnet is hosiery with an open, typically diamond-shaped knit; it is most often used as a material for stockings, tights, gloves or bodystockings. Fishnet is available in a multitude of colors, although it is most often sported in traditional matte black. Fishnet is commonly worn on the legs and arms by practitioners of goth and punk fashion, but is also commonly worn by the mainstream as a fashion statement. Similar to lingerie, fishnet is generally considered to be a sexually attractive garment and is typically associated with adult entertainment. Fishnets are used mostly as a type of undergarment, and in as much as it defines curves by applying a grid close to the body it generally accentuates the wearer's muscular definition.

A more practical use of fishnet textiles is in high performance next-to-skin apparel used in cold weather outdoor sports, including hiking, hunting, fishing, skiing, and mountaineering. In this context, fishnet is usually knitted from fibers of polypropylene, merino wool, or nylon, and offers a number of benefits over traditional densely knitted base layer apparel. These benefits are related to the presence of large void spaces in the fishnet fabric structure that trap insulating air for warmth in cool conditions, and allow for the rapid transport of moisture from the skin surface to outer layers to minimize conductive heat loss.

== History ==
During the 1920s, fishnets emerged as a more alternative trend in the U.S. and were favored by women like showgirls, in large part due to the fact that fishnets were more revealing than typical regular stockings of the day.

Fishnets later emerged as an eminent fashion staple in the post-war pin-up and print-porn world with models like Bettie Page, Jane Russell and Marilyn Monroe frequently appearing in fishnets.

In the 1970s and 1980s, the punk counterculture's fashion aesthetic included fishnets, often worn extra torn up with huge holes on the stockings or shredded up, as a reference to BDSM subculture.

== In pop culture ==
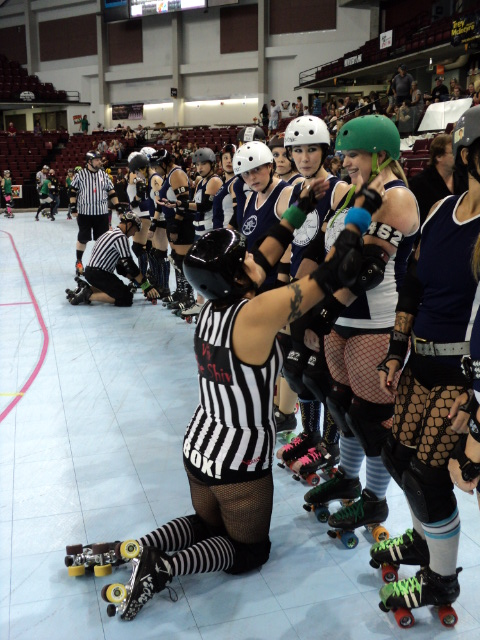
Roller derby athletes at an equipment check wearing three weaves of fishnet stockings ranging from coarse to fine

- An early (perhaps the earliest) written reference to fishnet as an erotic device can be found in the Westcar Papyrus, specifically the tale of Baufra – which is expanded in the 'Wonder of Djadjaemankh'.
- Fishnet stockings are commonplace roller derby regalia.
- DC Comics features two superheroines who have incorporated fishnet stockings into their crime-fighting costume, Black Canary and Zatanna.
- Cucumber Sandwiches & Fishnet Tights, a book by Margaret Walker (2006).
- The Stray Cats recorded a song entitled "Fishnet Stockings" on their European debut album in 1981.
- Some characters from Izuna: Legend of the Unemployed Ninja wear undershirts made of fishnet.
- Nearly every major character in The Rocky Horror Picture Show is seen wearing fishnets during the film.
- In the anime and manga One Piece the surgeon of the pirate crew Thriller Bark, Dr. Hogback, wears a fishnet shirt. His character and the whole Thriller Bark are based on horror movies, so he may be based on The Rocky Horror Picture Show itself. Nico Robin in the Thriller Bark arc wears fishnet stockings. Kalifa of CP9 also wears fishnets. Zambai of the Franky Family wears fishnets under his armor.
- "Fishnet Inc" is a cast which performs live before and during the film The Rocky Horror Picture Show at the Naro Theater in Norfolk, Virginia. It is named after the fishnets worn in the movie.
- Morris Day recorded the song "Fishnet" for the album Daydreaming in 1987. The song had airplay on several urban contemporary stations and ultimately reached No. 23 on the Billboard charts during 1988. The title and/or content of the song made airplay very limited in some cities. The song was remixed for a club mix album in 1994, and Day added a live version to his It's About Time album in 2004.
