= Djedi =

Fictional ancient Egyptian magician

Djedi in hieroglyphs
R11 R11 M17
Djedi
D(j)dj
he who endures

Djedi (also Dedi or Djedi of Djed-Sneferu) is the name of a fictional ancient Egyptian magician appearing in the fourth chapter of a story told in the legendary Westcar Papyrus. He is said to have worked wonders during the reign of king (pharaoh) Khufu (4th Dynasty).

== Literary person ==
Djedi appears only in the fourth story of the Westcar Papyrus – there is no archeological or historical evidence that he existed. Nevertheless, he is an object of great interest for historians and Egyptologists, since his magic tricks are connected to later cultural perceptions of the personality of king Khufu. Djedi is described as a commoner of extraordinary age, endowed with magical powers and talented in making prophecies.

== The wonder of Djedi ==
According to the Westcar Papyrus, prince Djedefhor brings up the story of Djedi. He stands before his father, king Khufu, and says: "There is only speaking of miracles which happened a long time ago, something known by past generations only. Truth and falsehood cannot be distinguished here. But there is someone under thy majesty's own lifetime who is not known, someone who is able to make an ignoramus become wise." Khufu asks: "What's the meaning of this, Djedefhor, my son?" Djedefhor answers: "There's a commoner named Djedi, living in Djed-Sneferu. He's a simple citizen, but 110 years old, eats 500 loaves of bread, a shoulder of beef and drinks 100 jars of beer every day. He is capable of resurrecting decapitated beings. He is also said to be able to make wild lions so obedient that the animal would follow him with a cord dragging on the ground. Furthermore, this Djedi has knowledge of the number of Iput in the wenet-sanctuary of Thoth." The pharaoh spent a good deal of time to seek for these chambers, for he planned to build something similar to his horizon. And Khufu orders: "You thyself, Djedefhor, my son, may bring him to me!"

And so Djedefhor arranges his journey during the first month of the schemu-season and travels to Djed-Sneferu. He finds Djedi and invites the old man to the king's palace with the words: "Your condition is equal to someone who lives from aging and to someone who sleeps until dawn, free of illness and wheezing. For 'aging' is the time of dying, the time of the preparing the burial and the time of being buried. This is the questioning about the condition of a noble man. I have come to summon you in order of my father, justified, that you may eat from the delicacies my father gives, the food of his followers. And then he may guide you to the ancestors which are in the necropolis now." Djedi replies: "Welcome, welcome, Djedefhor, son of the king, beloved of his father! May you be praised by your father, Khufu the justified. May he let your place be at the front of all time-honored ones. May thine Ka successfully champion all things against any enemy. May thine Ba know the ways that lead to the gateway of the mummified deceased." Djedefhor brings Djedi to the harbor and makes a boat prepared for traveling. The old man promises to follow Djedefhor, on the condition that he may bring his books and scholars with him. Djedefhor accepts, and both men travel to Khufu's royal palace.

Djedefhor enters the palace and goes immediately to his father, king Khufu. The prince says: "May thy majesty live, be blessed and being prosperous! I have brought Djedi to you!" Khufu replies: "Go and bring him to me!" Then Khufu takes place in the royal audience-hall. The Pharaoh receives Djedi with the words: "What is it, Djedi, this denying to have seen you ever before?" Djedi answers: "Oh sovereign, my lord! Only the one who is summoned is one who will come. I was summoned, and now see, oh sovereign, my lord, I have come.” The pharaoh continues: “Is it true, this talk-about that you could mend a severed head?" Djedi says: "Yes, oh sovereign, my lord. May you live, be blessed and prosperous. I know how to do that." Khufu replies: "May a prisoner, who is jailed, be brought to me, so that his execution may be enforced." Djedi refuses with the words: "Not to make a human suffer, oh sovereign, my lord! May you live, be blessed and prosperous. You see, it was never allowed to do something like that on the noble flock." Djedi chooses three animals instead – first a goose. He decapitates the goose and places her head at the eastern side of the audience hall, the body at the western side. Then Djedi utters a secret spell and the head of the goose stands up, starting to waddle. Then the body of the goose stands up and waddles, too. Both body-parts move into equal directions, then melt together. The resurrected goose now leaves the hall cackling. The same performance is done with an undefined water bird and a bull. Both animals are brought successfully back to life, too. Now the king says: "It is said that you know the number of Iput inside the wenet-sanctuary of Thoth. Now?" Djedi replies: "May you be praised, oh sovereign, my lord! I don't know their number. But I know where they can be found." Khufu asks: “Where is it?” Djedi answers: "There is a box of scrolls, made of flint, which is stored in a room called ‘archive’ at Heliopolis." The king orders: "Take that box!" Djedi replies: "May your highness be prosperous and blessed, I'm not the one who can bring it to you." Khufu asks: "Who may be the one who could bring it to me?" Djedi answers: "The eldest of the three children in the womb of Rededjet, he will bring it to you." The king says: "I really wish all these things you say. Who is it, this Rededjet?" Djedi replies: "It's the wife of a wab-priest of the god Ra, lord of Sachebu. The god has adumbrated, that the eldest of the three shall worship as a high priest of Heliopolis over the whole realm." The king's mood becomes grim after this. Djedi asks: "What is that heart of thine, oh sovereign, my lord, becoming so sad! Is it because of the children I have adumbrated? First your son, then his son and then one of them." Khufu replies: "When will this Rededjet give birth?" Djedi says: "It will happen during the first month of the peret-season, on the fifteenth day." Khufu becomes indignant: "But it's when the canal-of-two-Mugilidae is cut off!? I would even work with my very own hands to enter them! And then I will visit that temple of Ra, lord of Sachebu." And Djedi says: "Then I will make the waters at the fordable spots of the canal-of-two-Mugilidae become four cubits in height for you." Khufu stands up and orders: "Have Djedi assigned to a place within the palace of my son Djedefhor where he shall live from now on. His daily gainings be 1000 loaves of bread, 100 jars of beer, one neat and 100 bundles of field garlic." And all things are done as ordered.

== Modern analysis ==
Historians and Egyptologists such as Adolf Erman and Kurt Heinrich Sethe once thought the tales of Westcar Papyrus were mere folklore. Magical tricks that show animals being decapitated and their heads being replaced were performed as recently as a few decades ago, though today they are rarely shown because of aesthetical and ethical misgivings.

Modern Egyptologists like Verena Lepper and Miriam Lichtheim deny this view and they argue that Sethe and Erman may have just failed to see the profundity of such novels. They point to multiple similar but somewhat later ancient Egyptian writings in which magicians perform very similar magic tricks and make prophecies to a king. According to Lepper and Lichtheim, their stories are obviously inspired by the tale of Djedi. Descriptive examples are the papyri pAthen and The prophecy of Neferti. These novels show how popular the theme of prophesying already was during the Old Kingdom – just like in the story of the Westcar Papyrus. And they both talk about subalterns with magical powers similar to those of Djedi's. The Papyrus Berlin 3023 contains the novel The Eloquent Peasant, in which the following phrase appears: "See, these are artists who create the existing anew, who even replace a severed head", which can be interpreted as an allusion to the Westcar Papyrus. Papyrus Berlin 3023 contains another reference which strengthens the idea that many ancient Egyptian novels were influenced by Westcar Papyrus: column 232 contains the phrase sleeping until dawn, which appears nearly word-by-word in the Westcar Papyrus. Since pAthen, Papyrus Berlin 3023 and The prophecy of Neferti show the same manner of speaking and equal picking up quaint phrases, Lepper and Lichtheim hold that Djedi (and the other wise men from same papyrus) must have been known to Egyptian authors for a long time.
