= Nile: An Ancient Egyptian Quest =

1997 video game

- Developer(s): Stone House Productions
- Publisher(s): Simon & Schuster Interactive
- Platform(s): Microsoft Windows
- Release: WW: 1997
- Genre(s): Point-and-click adventure game, edutainment
- Mode(s): Single-player, multiplayer

Nile: An Ancient Egyptian Quest is a 1997 educational point-and-click adventure game developed by American studio Stone House Productions and published by Simon & Schuster Interactive for Windows 95 (also works on 98). Players rescue three pharaohs – of the Old, Middle, and New Kingdoms – by immersing themselves into ancient Egyptian culture and life. In the UK, it was published by Zablac Entertainment. The game is no longer available.

The Metropolitan Museum of New York gave Simon & Schuster Interactive permission to include 17 objects from their Egyptian collection in the game; they received a fee plus percentage of sales. For instance, the game includes a digital adaptation of the board game senet based on an artifact from the museum.

Throughout the exploration, the player is guided by jackal-formed Anubis (voiced by Connecticut-based community theatre actor Alexander Kulcsar). The player encounters scrolls containing video clips (narrated by actress Kelly McGillis) panning across and zooming on sketches, like simple motion comics. There are 15 clips, each about 3 minutes. They feature:

- pharaohs: Imhotep, Pepi II, Mentuhotep II, Hatshepsut, Amenhotep III (lake for his queen)
- roles of the scribe
- myths: the creation, Osiris, Horus, the wedjat eye
- Meketre's funerary figurines
- retellings of tales: the Shipwrecked Sailor, Sinuhe, Djadjaemankh the magician-scribe
- Thutmose IV's dream of the Sphinx (from the Dream Stele)

The background music is by English ambient musician Brian Eno, who included some tracks from his soundtrack of the TV series Neverwhere and his album Generative Music 1 (both were from 1996). The rest of the game's music is otherwise unreleased.
