= Nebka =

Throne name of an ancient Egyptian pharaoh

- Necherôchis, Necherôphes, likely identical with Sanakht
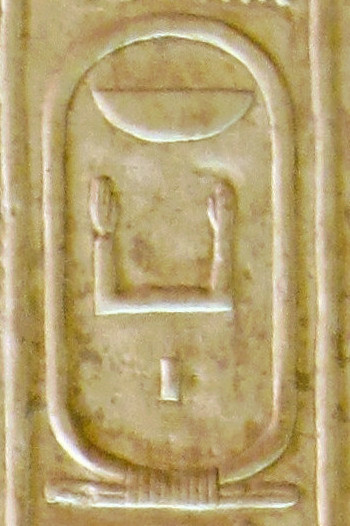
- Cartouche name of Nebka on the Abydos King List

Pharaoh
- Reign: duration uncertain in the 27th century BCE, possibly six years if identical with Sanakht, 19 years according to the Turin Canon, 28 years following Africanus' epithome of the Aegytiaca.
- Predecessor: Sekhemkhet (most likely), Khaba or Khasekhemwy (less likely)
- Successor: Khaba (most likely), Huni or Djoser (less likely)
Royal titulary
Prenomen
Tomb of Akhetaa (Third dynasty)
Nebka
Nb-k3
Lord of the ka or Possessor of a ka.
< V30 D28 Z1 >
Abydos King List
Nebka
Nb-k3
Lord of the ka
< V30 D28 Z1 >
Saqqara King List
Nebkara
Nb-k3-r3
Lord of the Ka of Râ
< N5 V30 D28 >
Turin King List
Nebka...
Nb-k3
Lord of the ka
< V30 D28 Z1 HASH >
- Dynasty: Third Dynasty

Nebka (meaning "Lord of the ka") is the throne name of an ancient Egyptian pharaoh of the Third Dynasty during the Old Kingdom period, in the 27th century BCE. He is thought to be identical with the Hellenized name Νεχέρωχις (Necherôchis or Necherôphes) recorded by the Egyptian priest Manetho of the much later Ptolemaic period.

Nebka's name is otherwise recorded from the near contemporaneous tomb of a priest of his cult as well as in a possible cartouche from Beit Khallaf, later New Kingdom king lists and in a story of the Westcar Papyrus. If the Beit Khallaf seal impression is indeed a cartouche of Nebka, then he is the earliest king to have thus recorded his throne name, otherwise this innovation can be ascribed to Huni.

Nebka is thought by most Egyptologists to be the throne name of Sanakht, the third or fourth ruler of the Third Dynasty, who is sparsely attested by archaeological evidence and must have had only a short reign. Older hypotheses followed two New Kingdom sources which credit Nebka with founding the Third Dynasty, a view that is now believed to contradict the archaeological evidence. The tomb of Nebka has not been located with any certainty and three locations have been proposed: a mastaba in Beit Khallaf attributed to Sanakht by John Garstang, a mudbrick structure in Abu Rawash seen as the tomb of Nebka by Swelim and Dodson, and the Unfinished Northern Pyramid of Zawyet El Aryan.

== Name sources ==
The earliest source for Nebka's name is the mastaba tomb of the late Third Dynasty high official Akhetaa who, among other positions, held that of "priest of Nebka". The exact location of Akhetaa's mastaba is now lost, hindering further research. It may be near Abusir, where some relief-bearing blocks from the tomb were found re-used as construction material.

The next oldest source is found in a story recorded on the Westcar Papyrus which dates to the Seventeenth Dynasty, but which was likely first written during the late Middle Kingdom period, possibly at the end of the Twelfth Dynasty. There, a king Nebka is cited in the story known as “Nebka and the crocodile”, which pertains to adultery and the typical sort of punishment for that during the Old Kingdom. The story throws a positive light on the personality of king Nebka, who is depicted as a strict but lawful judge. He punishes mischief and unethical behavior, in this case punishing the betrayal of an unfaithful wife with the death penalty. The passage involving Nebka starts after a magician, Ubaoner, throws a commoner who had an affair with Ubaoner's wife to a crocodile, who swallows him for seven days:

During these seven days Ubaoner is received by pharaoh Nebka for an important audience. After the audience Ubaoner invites Nebka to visit his house with the words: “May thy majesty proceed and see the wonder that has happened in the time of thy majesty [... text damaged ...] a commoner.” Nebka and Ubaoner walk to the lake where Ubaoner orders the crocodile to come out of the water and to release the commoner. When king Nebka sees that he says: “This crocodile is dangerous!” But Ubaoner bends down and touches the crocodile and immediately it becomes a figurine of wax again. Then Ubaoner gives a report to Nebka about the affairs. Nebka tells the crocodile: “Take away what is yours!” and the animal grabs the commoner and then disappears. The wife of Ubaoner is brought to Nebka too, and the pharaoh sentences her to death. She is brought to a place east of the palace and burnt alive. Her ash is thrown into the Nile.

The subsequent historical sources date to the Nineteenth Dynasty: the Royal Table of Saqqara mentions a Nebkara close to the end of the Third Dynasty as the direct successor of Sekhemkhet and predecessor of Huni. This Nebkara is likely a variant of the name Nebka. The near contemporaneous Abydos King list and Turin canon record a king Nebka, this time as the founder of the Third Dynasty.

Finally, a king Necherôchis is listed as the founder of the Third Dynasty in the Aegyptiaca, a history of Egypt written in the 3rd century BCE during the reign of Ptolemy II (283–246 BCE) by an Egyptian priest, Manetho. No copies of the Aegyptiaca have survived to this day and it is now known only through later writings by Sextus Julius Africanus and Eusebius, themselves quoted by the Byzantine scholar George Syncellus. According to these sources, the Aegyptiaca gave Necherôchis as the predecessor of Sesorthos or Tosorthros, both names being widely held to refer to Djoser as the Aegyptiaca credits Sesorthos with the invention of stone architecture. Necherôchis (Eusebius) or Necherôphes (Africanus), both likely Hellenized forms of Nebka, is said to have faced a rebellion of Libyans during his reign, but "when the moon waxed beyond reckoning, they surrendered in terror". Africanus further credits Necherôphes with 28 years of reign.

== Identity ==
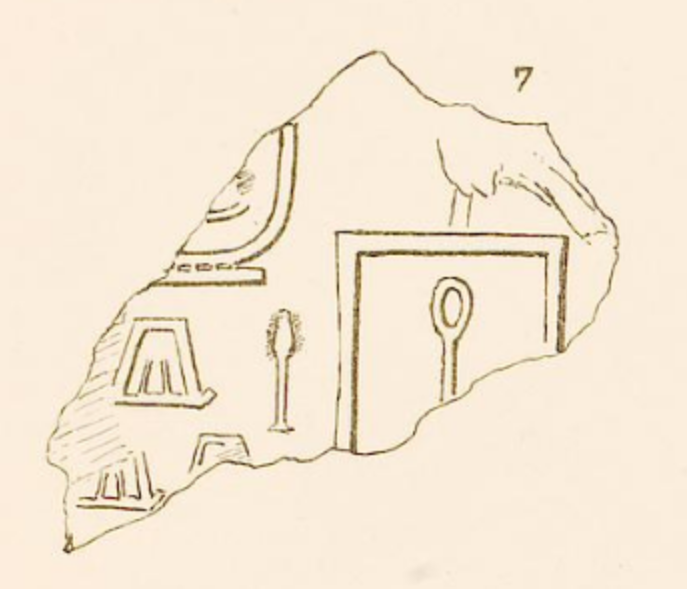
Seal impression from Beit Khallaf showing Sanakht's serekh together with what could be a cartouche of Nebka.

Nebka's identity with respect to other Third Dynasty rulers is now partially settled. Most scholars including Thomas Schneider, Darrell Baker, Peter Clayton, Michel Baud, Jaromír Málek, Toby Wilkinson, Kenneth Anderson Kitchen, Stephan Seidlmayer, Michael Rice, Ronald Leprohon and Rainer Stadelmann are convinced that Nebka was identical with Hor-Sanakht. This opinion is based on a single fragmentary clay seal discovered by Garstand in 1902 in Beit Khallaf, a locality north of Abydos. Kurt Sethe proposed that the damaged sealing shows the serekh of Sanakht next to a fragmentary cartouche housing an archaic form of the sign for "ka". The cartouche is believed to be just large enough to have enclosed the further sign "Neb". In addition, a further two dozen sealings of Sanakht were uncovered in Beit Khallaf's nearby tomb K2, which John Garstang believed to be this king's tomb. If the identification of Nebka with Sanakht is correct, then Nebka is the earliest king to write his throne name in a cartouche and otherwise this innovation would pass to Huni.

Egyptologists John D. Degreef, Nabil Swelim, and Wolfgang Helck resisted the equation of Nebka with Sanakht in earlier research. They underline the heavily damaged nature of the Beit Khallaf seal fragment and hence that the alleged cartouche can be hardly identified with certainty. Instead, they propose that the cartouche could actually be the oval-shaped crest of a royal fortress with one or several boats in it, a city that may have already been mentioned under the name “Elder's boats” in sources dating to the Second Dynasty king Peribsen.

== Chronology ==
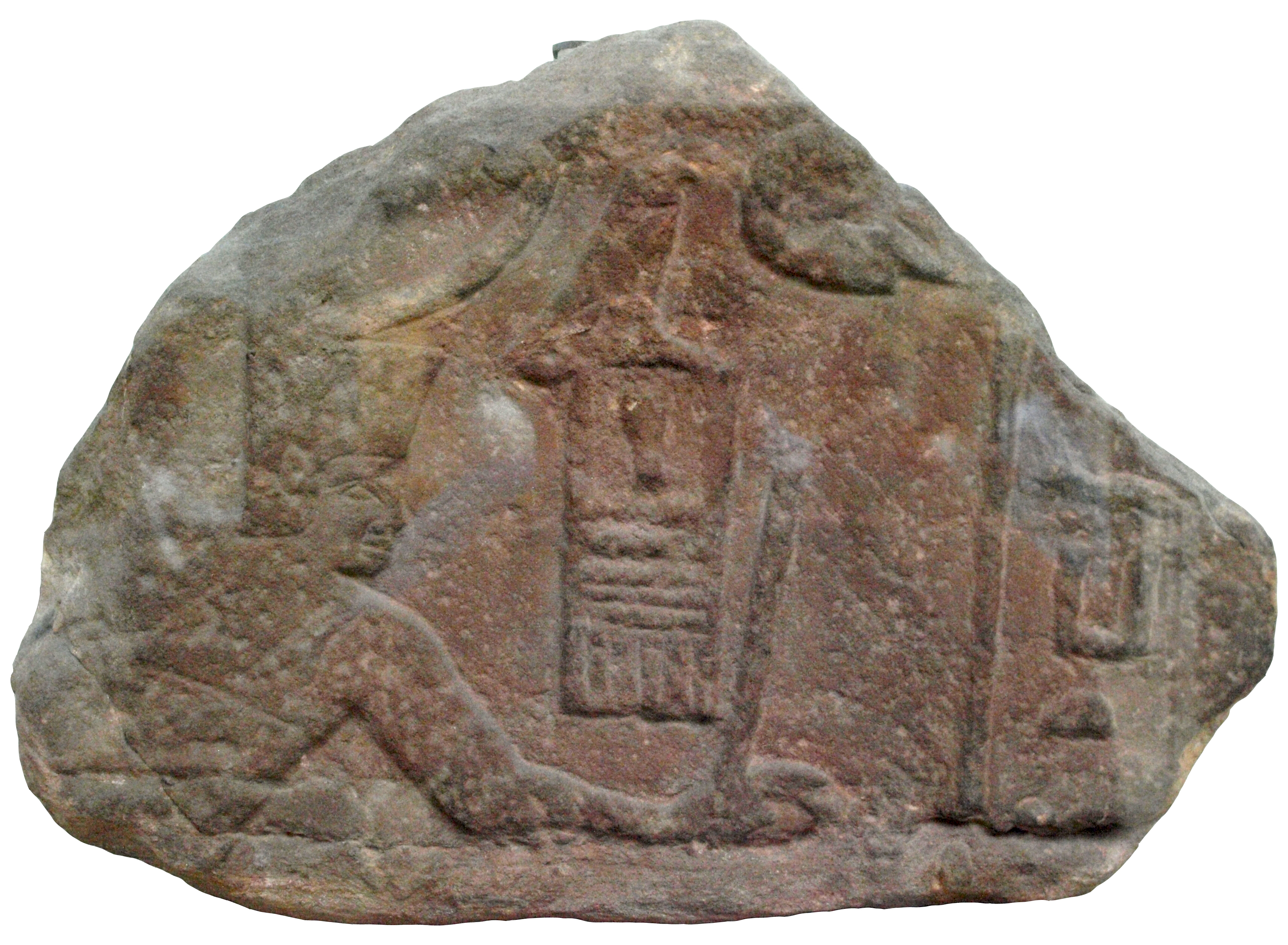
Relief fragment of Sanakht from Sinai

Nebka's relative chronological position has been the subject of debate in earlier Egyptology, as he is listed as the first pharaoh of the Third Dynasty in both the Turin (third column, seventh line) and Abydos (15th entry) king lists. Some Egyptologists including Málek tried to reconcile this position in the list with the evidence from Beit Khallaf by proposing that Nebka Sanakht reigned for a short time between the last Second Dynasty ruler Khasekhemwy and Djoser, whom Málek sees as a younger brother to Sanakht.

This is now understood to "flatly contradict" (quoting Wilkinson) much archaeological evidence, which rather point to Djoser as the first ruler of the dynasty and Sekhemkhet as his immediate successor. For example, numerous seal fragments of Djoser uncovered in the tomb of Khasekhemwy strongly suggest that he buried this king who might have been his father. Khasekhemwy's wife and likely Djoser's mother, queen Nimaethap, was herself buried in tomb K1 of Beit Khallaf which yielded many seals of Djoser but none of Sanakht. Nimaethap was furthermore given the title of “Mother of a king”, that is with a singular, implying that she had only one son who ascended the throne, precluding the reign of Sanakht between those of Khasekhemwy and Djoser. Kitchen also observes that the Turin Canon gives exactly the same reign length of 19 years to both Nebka and Djoser, hinting at an error in the placement of Nebka's name on the canon and the attribution of Djoser's regnal years to Nebka. In addition, the Saqqara king list places Nebka after Sekhemkhet rather than before Djoser.

Further indirect evidence for Nebka's placement in the late Third Dynasty comes from the Papyrus Westcar, which records the story of "Nebka and the crocodile" between two tales set in the reigns of Djoser and Huni and Sneferu, respectively. Evidence from the tomb of Akhetaa regarding the chronological position of Nebka is inconclusive: on the one hand, Akhetaa's title could indicate that he was priest of the cult of the reigning king and thus that Nebka was alive at the end of the Third Dynasty. On the other hand, it could equally be that Akhetaa was priest of a funerary cult, in which case Nebka's placement could be somewhat earlier.

Given the likely identification of Nebka with Sanakht and the placement of the later in the late Third Dynasty, perhaps as the penultimate king of this line, it is possible that Nebka Sanakht reigned for six years. This is the duration credited by the Turin canon to the immediate predecessor of Huni, whose name is lost, and in any case a short reign better fits the scant archaeological evidence for both Nebka and Sanakht.

== Tomb ==
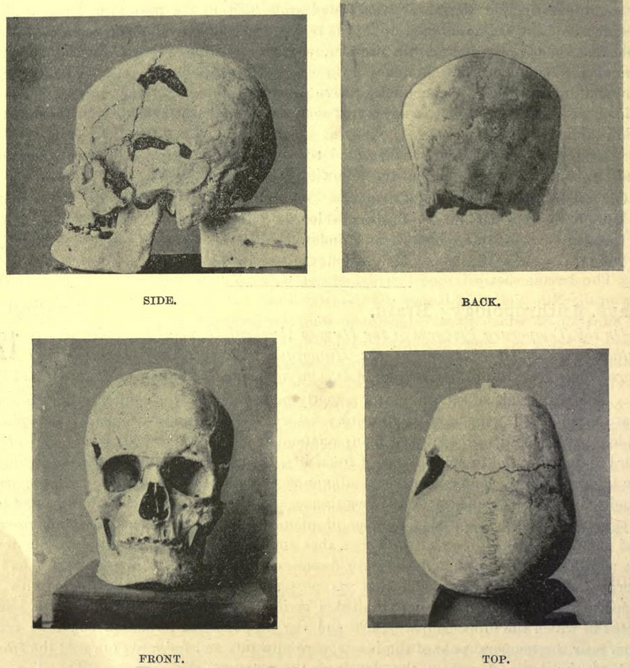
Skull uncovered in Beit Khallaf tomb K2, attributed to Sanakht by Garstang. The bones found in K2 exhibit gigantism, as the individual was over 1.87 m (6 ft 1 1/2 in) tall.

The tomb of Nebka has not been located with any certainty, nor has that of Sanakht. Garstang, who excavated mastaba K2 at Beit Khallaf, believed that it belonged to Sanakht as seals bearing this pharaoh's name were uncovered there, beside a burial. Dieter Arnold and other Egyptologists now think mastaba K2 was the tomb of a private individual rather than a royal one, though the old theory is still supported.

Swelim and Aidan Dodson have instead proposed that a mudbrick structure located in Abu Rawash could be the tomb of Nebka. Dodson states that it is a "mudbrick enclosure 330 m × 170 m (1,080 ft × 560 ft) with a 20 m (66 ft) central square massif of the same material, located north of the modern village of Abu Roash, known as El Dair. It has been badly damaged by drainage work since first being discovered in 1902, and now may be beyond saving. However, the plan seems to closely resemble royal funerary monuments of the late Second and early Third Dynasties, while pottery from the site has been dated to the latter period".

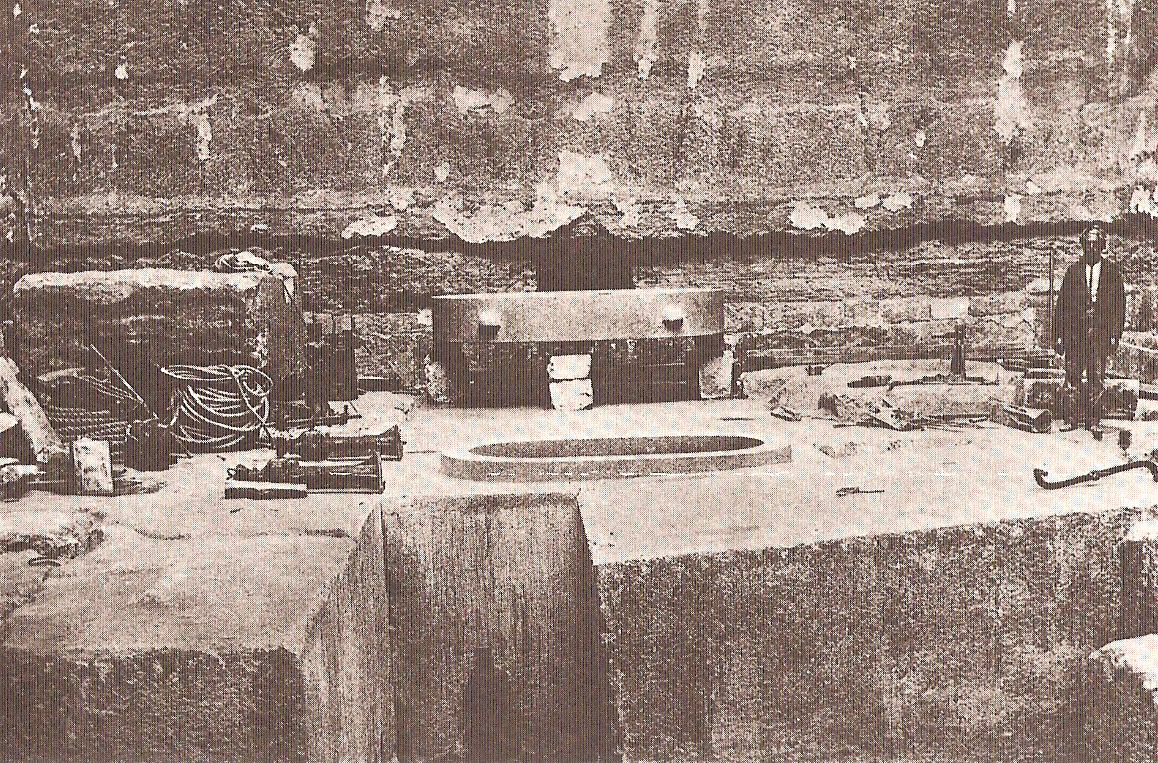
Stone sarcophagus from the unfinished Northern Pyramid of Zawyet El Aryan.

On the other hand, some Egyptologists have noticed that Nebka's name seems to be inscribed in the Unfinished Northern Pyramid of Zawyet El Aryan under the form Nebkara, so that this structure could have been started by this king. More precisely, they point to several graffiti made of black and red ink which were found in the chamber and in the descending stairway of the pyramid. Alessandro Barsanti recorded at least 67 inscriptions with the names of different workmen crews as well as the name of the planned pyramid complex: Seba ?-Ka, meaning "The Star of ?-Ka". The workmen crew whose name appears most often — thus being the leading crew during the building works — was Wer-ef-seba ?-Ka, meaning "Great Like the Star of (King) ?-Ka". Inscription No. 35 gives the name Neferka-Nefer (meaning "His Beautiful Ka is Flawless"), but otherwise lacks any reference to known people from the Third or Fourth Dynasty, to which this pyramid is usually ascribed. Graffiti No. 15 and No. 52 mention the royal name Nebkarâ, meaning "Lord of the Ka of Râ" and a further inscription, No. 55, mentions a possible Horus of Gold name: Neb hedjet-nwb, meaning "Lord of the Golden Crown". Some Egyptologists propose that this is either the Horus name of king Huni or the Horus of Gold name of Nebka.

== References and sources ==
=== Sources ===
- Allen, James; Allen, Susan; Anderson, Julie; Arnold, Arnold; Arnold, Dorothea; Cherpion, Nadine; David, Élisabeth; Grimal, Nicolas; Grzymski, Krzysztof; Hawass, Zahi; Hill, Marsha; Jánosi, Peter; Labée-Toutée, Sophie; Labrousse, Audran; Lauer, Jean-Phillippe; Leclant, Jean; Der Manuelian, Peter; Millet, N. B.; Oppenheim, Adela; Craig Patch, Diana; Pischikova, Elena; Rigault, Patricia; Roehrig, Catharine H.; Wildung, Dietrich; Ziegler, Christiane (1999). "Relief Block with the Figure of Aa-akhti". Egyptian Art in the Age of the Pyramids. New York: The Metropolitan Museum of Art. pp. 189–190. ISBN 978-0-8109-6543-0. OCLC 41431623.
- Arnold, Dieter; Gardiner, Sabine H.; Strudwick, Helen; Strudwick, Nigel (2003). The Encyclopedia of Ancient Egyptian Architecture. Princeton, N.J.: Princeton University Press. ISBN 978-0-69-111488-0.
- Baker, Darrell (2008). The Encyclopedia of the Pharaohs: Volume I - Predynastic to the Twentieth Dynasty 3300–1069 BC. Stacey International. ISBN 978-1-905299-37-9.
- Baud, Michel (2007). Djéser et la IIIe dynastie. Grands pharaons (in French). Paris: Pygmalion. ISBN 978-2-75-641753-0.
- Burkard, Günter; Thissen, Heinz Josef; Quack, Joachim Friedrich (2003). Einführung in die altägyptische Literaturgeschichte. Band 1: Altes und Mittleres Reich. Einführungen und Quellentexte zur Ägyptologie. Vol. 1, 3, 6. Münster: LIT. ISBN 978-3-82-580987-4.
- Clayton, Peter (1994). Chronicle of the Pharaohs. London: Thames & Hudson. ISBN 978-0-500-05074-3.
- Dodson, Aidan (1998). "On the threshold of glory: the third dynasty". KMT: A Modern Journal of Egyptology. 9 (2): 26–40.
- Erman, Adolf (1890). Die Märchen des Papyrus Westcar I. Einleitung und Commentar. Mitteilungen aus den Orientalischen Sammlungen (in German). Vol. V. Berlin: Spemann, Königliche Museen zu Berlin. OCLC 898843662.
- Garstang, John (1903). Maḥâsna and Bêt Khallâf. London: B. Quaritch. OCLC 457606654.
- Gundacker, Roman (2009). "Zur Struktur der Pyramidennamen der 4. Dynastie". Sokar (in German). 18. ISSN 1438-7956.
- Helck, Wolfgang (1987). Untersuchungen zur Thintenzeit. Ägyptologische Abhandlungen (in German). Vol. 45. Wiesbaden: Harrassowitz. ISBN 978-3-447-02677-2.
- Kahl, Jochem (2001). "Third Dynasty". In Redford, Donald B. (ed.). The Oxford Encyclopedia of Ancient Egypt, Volume 2. Oxford: Oxford University Press. pp. 591–593. ISBN 978-0-19-510234-5.
- Kitchen, Kenneth A (1998). Ramesside Inscriptions, Translated and Annotated Notes and Comments. Volume II, Ramesses II, Royal inscriptions. London: Blackwell. ISBN 978-0-63-118435-5.
- Lichtheim, Miriam (2000). Ancient Egyptian literature: a book of readings. The Old and Middle Kingdoms, Volume 1. University of California Press. ISBN 978-0-520-02899-9.
- Lepper, Verena M. (2008). Untersuchungen zu pWestcar. Eine philologische und literaturwissenschaftliche (Neu-)Analyse. Ägyptologische Abhandlungen (in German). Vol. 70. Wiesbaden: Harrassowitz. ISBN 978-3-447-05651-9.
- Leprohon, Ronald J. (2013). The great name: ancient Egyptian royal titulary. Writings from the ancient world, no. 33. Atlanta: Society of Biblical Literature. ISBN 978-1-58983-736-2.
- Málek, Jaromír (2000). "The Old Kingdom (c. 2160–2055 BC)". In Shaw, Ian (ed.). The Oxford History of Ancient Egypt. Oxford: Oxford University Press. ISBN 978-0-19-815034-3.
- Myers, Charles S. (1901). "The Bones of Hen Nekht, an Egyptian King of the Third Dynasty". The Journal of the Royal Anthropological Institute of Great Britain and Ireland. XXX, New series III. London: Royal Anthropological Institute of Great Britain and Ireland.
- Parkinson, R. B. (2001). "Papyrus Westcar". In Redford, Donald B. (ed.). The Oxford Encyclopedia of Ancient Egypt, Volume 3. Oxford: Oxford University Press. pp. 24–25. ISBN 978-0-19-510234-5.
- Pätznik, Jean-Pierre (2005). Die Siegelabrollungen und Rollsiegel der Stadt Elephantine im 3. Jahrtausend v. Chr. : Spurensicherung eines archäologischen Artefaktes. Breasted's Ancient Records (BAR), International Series (in German). Vol. 1339. Oxford: Archaeopress. ISBN 978-1-84171-685-5. OCLC 492410616.
- Porter, Bertha; Moss, Rosalind L. B.; Burney, Ethel W. (1974). Topographical bibliography of ancient Egyptian hieroglyphic texts, reliefs, and paintings. III/1. Memphis. Abû Rawâsh to Abûṣîr (PDF) (second, revised and augmented by Jaromír Málek ed.). Oxford: Griffith Institute, Oxford University Press at the Clarendon Press. ISBN 978-0-900416-19-4.
- Rice, Michael (1999). Who is who in Ancient Egypt. London & New York: Routledge. ISBN 978-0-203-44328-6.
- Schneider, Thomas (2002). Lexikon der Pharaonen (in German). Düsseldorf: Albatros Verlag. ISBN 978-3-49-196053-4.
- Seidlmayer, S. J. (1996). "Town and state in the early Old Kingdom. A view from Elephantine". In Spencer, Jeffrey (ed.). Aspects of Early Egypt. London: British Museum Press. ISBN 978-0-71-410999-2.
- Stadelmann, Rainer (1985). Die Ägyptischen Pyramiden: vom Ziegelbau zum Weltwunder. Kulturgeschichte der antiken Welt (in German). Vol. 30. Mainz: von Zabern. ISBN 978-3805308557.
- Swelim, Nabil (1983). "Some Problems on the History of the Third Dynasty". Archaeological and Historical Studies. 7. Alexandria: The Archaeological Society of Alexandria.
- Verner, Miroslav (1999). Die Pyramiden (in German). Reinbek: Rowohlt-Taschenbuch-Verlag. ISBN 978-3-4996-0890-2.
- Verner, Miroslav (2001). "Old Kingdom: An Overview". In Redford, Donald B. (ed.). The Oxford Encyclopedia of Ancient Egypt, Volume 2. Oxford: Oxford University Press. pp. 585–591. ISBN 978-0-19-510234-5.
- von Beckerath, Jürgen (1999). Handbuch der ägyptischen Königsnamen. Münchner ägyptologische Studien (in German). Vol. 49. Mainz: Philip von Zabern. ISBN 978-3-8053-2591-2.
- Waddell, William Gillan (1971). Manetho. Loeb classical library, 350. Cambridge, Massachusetts; London: Harvard University Press; W. Heinemann. OCLC 6246102.
- Weill, Raymond (1908). Les Origines de l'Egypte Pharaonique, 1ère Partie. La IIe et la IIIe Dynasties (in French). Paris: Ernest Leroux. OCLC 422033129.
- Wildung, Dietrich (1969). Die Rolle ägyptischer Könige im Bewusstsein ihrer Nachwelt. Posthume Quellen über die Könige der ersten vier Dynastien. Münchner ägyptologische Studien. Vol. 17. Berlin: B. Hessling. OCLC 644820022.
- Wilkinson, Toby A. H. (1999). Early Dynastic Egypt. Strategies, Society and Security. London: Routledge. ISBN 978-0-415-18633-9.
