= Baufra =

Alleged son of the pharaoh Khufu

Baufra in hieroglyphs
ra Z1 G30 V1 Y1 Z2 f
Bau-f-Râ
B3.w-f-Rʾ
Re is his glory
Papyrus Westcar, column 4.18
< ra G29 f >
Ba-ef-Rê
B3-f-Rʾ
Re is his glory
Wadi Hammamat, cartouche name no.5

Baufra /bɑːuːfrɑː/ (also read as Bauefre and Ra-bau-ef) is the name of an alleged son of the ancient Egyptian king (pharaoh) Khufu from the 4th Dynasty of the Old Kingdom. He is known from a story in the Papyrus Westcar and from a rock inscription at Wadi Hammamat. He is neither contemporarily nor archaeologically attested, which makes his historical figure disputable to scholars up to this day.

== Identity ==
It is possible that Baufra is identical to either Horbaef or Babaef I.

=== Baufra in Wadi Hammamat ===
In the inscription in Wadi Hammamat Baufra's name is written in a royal cartouche, which brings up some confusion within egyptology, since Baufra is neither contemporarily nor archaeologically attested. It might be that he was worshipped as a local patronate of the mine workers. A similar phenomenon can be observed with prince Hordjedef, whose name is also erroneously written in a cartouche, despite the fact that he is handed down by archaeologically attested inscriptions as a “son of the king” only. Baufra´s name appears as the last name in a list naming the kings Khufu, Djedefre, Khafre and Hordjedef. Egyptologists such as Donald B. Redford believe that the name and glorification of Baufra and Djedefhor are both based on a misunderstanding which arose at the beginning of the New Kingdom, when literary works like Khufu and the magicians and the Prophecy of Neferti were composed and the protagonists were invested with alleged historical roles. The Egyptians may have thought that all the sons and grandsons of Khufu had ruled after this king, since all kings up to Shepseskaf were actually sons, grandsons or great-grandsons of Khufu. This line of successors would then have been erroneously thought to have included Baufra and Djedefor.

=== Baufra in Westcar Papyrus ===
Baufra appears in the Papyrus Westcar as a literary figure. His name is given here as a private name without royal cartouche. In the story, the sons of Khufu entertain their father by telling him stories about magicians and miracles which were witnessed under Khufu´s ancestors Djoser, Nebka and Sneferu. Baufra appears as the narrator of the third story.

Baufra tells the tale about his royal grandfather Sneferu, Khufu's father. In the story it is revealed that Sneferu was bored and depressed one day, and his priest Djadjaemankh tells him that he should call lovely girls for a rowing trip on the royal lake. When chilling at the lake the trip is interrupted by the stroke maid who lost a precious amulet. Djadjaemankh rescues the amulet by using a spell which moves the waters of the lake aside. Then the amulet is brought back to the maid and the rowing trip is continued. Sneferu is pleased with Djadjaemankh, rewards him generously and spends the rest of the day celebrating.

On hearing the completion of this tale, Khufu gives offerings to the Kas of Sneferu and Djadjaemankh, and he is pleased with his son Baufra.

== Possible tomb ==
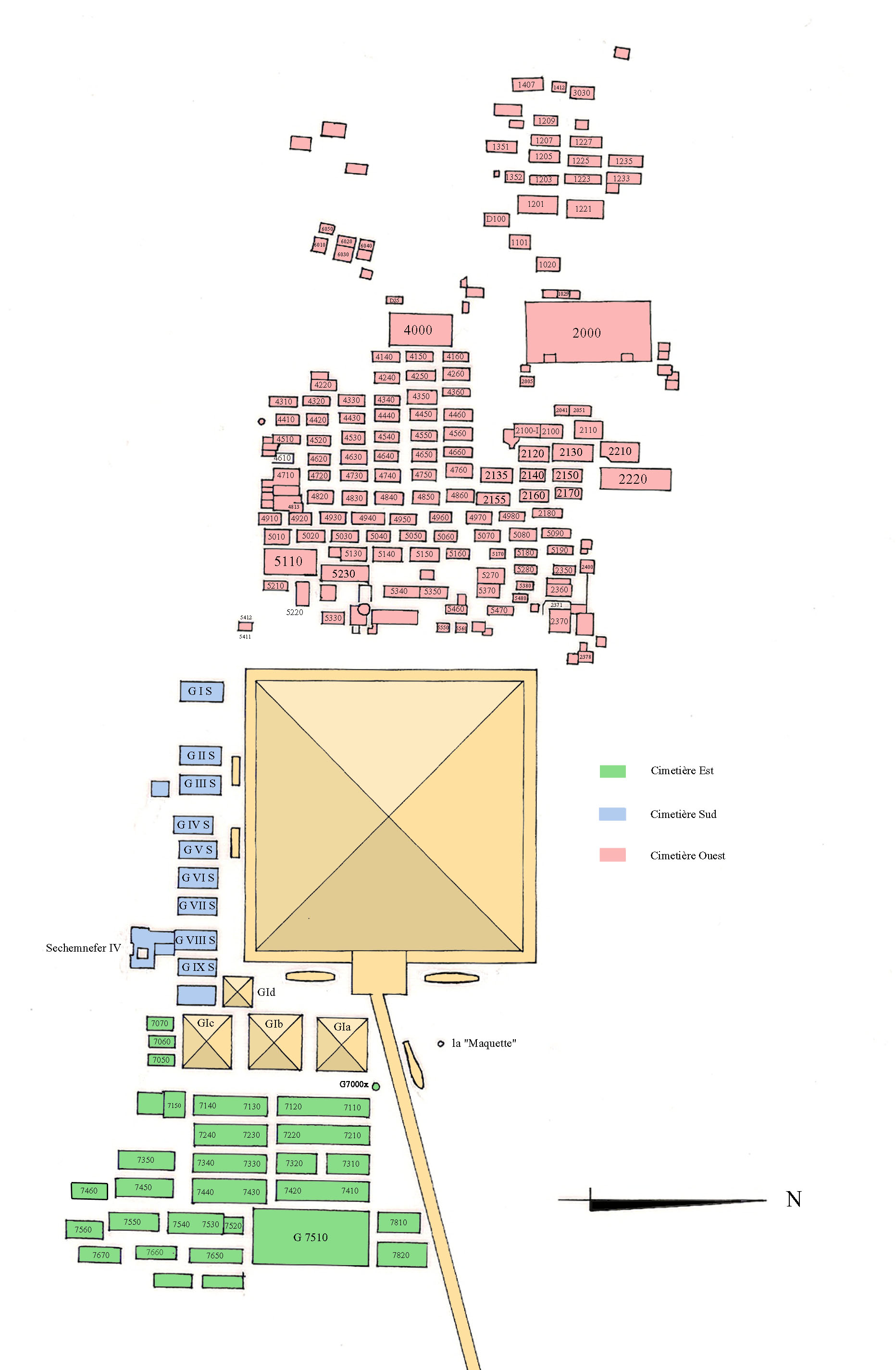
Tomb of Baufra is located near the east side(depicted in green) compared to the Great Pyramid of Giza as shown in the centre of the picture.

The double mastaba G 7310 – 7320 in the east field of the Giza Necropolis has been attributed to Baufra several times. But others have tentatively assigned the tomb to prince Babaef I.
