= Urkunden des ægyptischen Altertums =

Series of editions of Ancient Egyptian texts

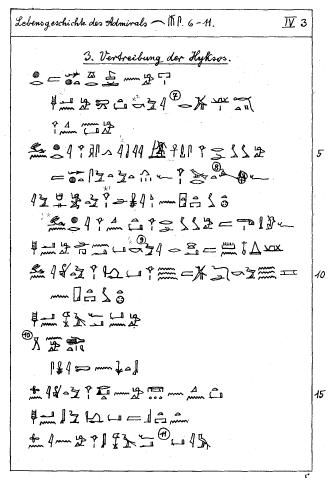
An autographed transcription of a text from the tomb of Ahmose, son of Ebana, from Urkunden IV

Urkunden des ægyptischen Altertums is a series of editions of Ancient Egyptian texts, published between 1903–1961.

The series comprises eight volumes:

- I. Urkunden des Alten Reichs (Old Kingdom)
- II. Hieroglyphische Urkunden der Griechisch-Römischen Zeit (Greek and Roman periods)
- III. Urkunden der Älteren Athiopenkönige (Nubian Dynasty), ed. Heinrich Schäfer 1905
- IV. Urkunden der 18. Dynastie (18th Dynasty), ed. Hans Wolfgang Helck 1955–1958
- V. Religiöse Urkunden (religious texts)
- VI. Urkunden Mythologischen Inhalts (mythological texts)
- VII. Urkunden des Mittleren Reiches (Middle Kingdom)
- VIII. Historisch-biographische Urkunden der Zeit zwischen AR u. MR. (First Intermediate Period)

== Urkunden der 18. Dynastie ==
Urkunden der 18. Dynastie is a collection of hieroglyphic texts from the 18th Dynasty of ancient Egypt, as compiled by German scholar Kurt Heinrich Sethe. This was part of Urkunden des ægyptischen Altertums.

Urkunden der 18. Dynastie represents 1226 pages of handwritten hieroglyphic texts (16 fascicles), being the longest part in the Urkunden series, and contains all the records of the 18th Dynasty through most of the reign of Thutmosis III.

This was later followed in 1955–1958 by fascicles 17–22 by Hans Wolfgang Helck, who completed the series through the reigns of Amenhotep II to that of Horemheb. Helck also translated all of the Egyptian texts into German, which was published separately. An English translation of the German translations of fascicles 17–19 is published as Egyptian Historical Records of the Later Eighteenth Dynasty by Barbara Cumming.

=== Fascicles ===
Urkunden IV is divided into 22 hefte (fascicles).

- 1: Time of the Hyksos and their earliest successors
- 2: Time of Kings Thutmosis I and II
- 3: Beginning of The Government of Thutmosis III and the Birth of Hatshepsut
- 4: Time of Hatshepsut
- 5: Time of Hatshepsut
- 6: Contemporary with Hatshepsut
- 7: Contemporary with Hatshepsut
- 8: Time of Thutmosis III
- 9-10: Time of Thutmosis III
- 11: Time of Thutmosis III
- 12: Time of Thutmosis III and Amenhotep II
- 13-16: Time of Thutmosis III
- 17: Historische Inschriften Thutmosis’ III. und Amenophis’ II.
- 18: Biographische Inschriften von Zeitgenossen Thutmosis’ III. und Amenophis’ II.
- 19: Historische Inschriften Thutmosis’ IV. und biographische Inschriften seiner Zeitgenossen
- 20: Historische Inschriften Amenophis’ III.
- 21: Inschriften von Zeitgenossen Amenophis’ III.
- 22: Inschriften Amenophis III. bis Haremheb und ihrer Zeitgenossen

=== Availability ===
All of the Urkunden series has been out of print for a very long time, and since the number of people who can read Egyptian is quite small, not many were printed. Obtaining a print version of any one of the four bound volumes of Urkunden IV can be quite expensive. However, since fascicles 1–16 are in the public domain, Urkunden IV, as well as the other volumes of Urkunden des ægyptischen Altertums, are available online free of cost at numerous libraries.
