= Djedefhor =

Ancient Egyptian prince

- overseer of all works of the king
Egyptian name
H Hr r Dd f
- Born: Djedefhor
- Died: c. 2530 BC
- Burial: Giza, Egypt
- Father: Khufu
- Children: Auibra

Djedefhor or Hordjedef (died c. 2530 BC) was a noble Egyptian of the 4th Dynasty. He was the son of King Khufu and his name means "Enduring Like Horus".

== Biography ==
Djedefhor was a son of Khufu and half-brother of kings Djedefre and Khafre. Queen Meritites I is named in the tomb G 7220 of Djedefhor and it is possible she is his mother.

He is mentioned on an inscription in Wadi Hammamat, his name appears in a cartouche, written after the names of Khufu, Djedefre and Khafre, preceding the name of another of his brothers, Baufra. There is no evidence that either Djedefhor or Baufra ruled as a king, even though only kings' names were written in cartouches during the 4th dynasty.

The Teachings of Djedefhor, a document of which only fragments remain, is attributed to him. Djedefhor may have been deified after his death though this is disputed.

== Titles ==
Djedefhor's titles were:

Title	Translation	Jones Index
imy-rȝ kȝt nbt (nt) nzwt	overseer of all works of the king	950
tȝyty zȝb ṯȝty	he of the curtain, chief justice, vizier	3706
iry-pˁt	hereditary prince/nobleman, 'keeper of the patricians'	1157
wr di.w pr ḏḥwty	Greatest of the Five in the temple of Thoth	1471
mniw nḫn	protector/guardian of Hierakonpolis	1597
rȝ p nb	mouth of every Pe-ite/Butite (see Buto)	1831
ḥȝty-ˁ	count	1858
ḥry-sštȝ n it.f	privy to the secret of his father	2241
ḥry-sštȝ n nzwt m swt.f nbt	privy to the secret [of the king in] all his cult places/secretary [of the king in] all his cult-places	2311
ḫrp ˁḥ	director of the ˁḥ palace	2579
ẖry-ḥbt	lector priest, 'he who cames the ritual-book'	2848
ẖry-ḥbt ḥry-tp	chief lector priest, lector priest in charge	2860
zȝ nswt	king's son	2911
zȝ nswt n ẖt.f smsw	king's eldest son of his body	2914
zš mḏȝt-nṯr	scribe of the god's book	3132
smr	companion, courtier	3263
smr wˁty	sole companion	3268
smr wˁty n it.f	sole companion of his father	3272
nb imȝḫw ḫr it.f	possessor of reverence with his father	1782

Translation and indexes from Dilwyn Jones.

== Burial ==
He was still alive during the reign of Menkaure, Khufu's grandson. Hence he must have been buried towards the end of the Fourth Dynasty. Djedefhor was buried in mastaba G 7210–7220 in the east field which is part of the Giza pyramid complex. His sarcophagus is now in the Egyptian Museum in Cairo.

== Appearance in ancient Egyptian fiction ==
He is one of the main characters in a story included in the Papyrus Westcar. In the text of that papyrus, Djedefhor is mentioned as one who brought the soothsayer and magician called Djedi to the court of Khufu. This Djedi was inspired by real Prince Djedi, who was a son of Prince Rahotep and nephew to Khufu.
