= Standard Theory (Egyptology) =

Now-disfavored theory of Egyptian grammar

In Egyptology, the Standard Theory or Polotskyan Theory, sometimes abbreviated ST, is an approach to the verbal syntax of the Egyptian language originally developed by Hans Jakob Polotsky in which Egyptian verb forms are regarded as variously adjectival, substantival, or adverbial, with the possibility of ‘transposing’ any given verb phrase into any of these three classes. This analysis rests on the basis of systematically applying substitutional rules for syntactic nodes, whereby certain verb phrases are seen to be syntactically converted into noun phrases or adverb phrases because of the possibility of substituting such phrases in place of the verb phrase. This approach was widely adopted in the mid-20th century but eventually fell out of favor starting in the 1980s.

== History ==
The Standard Theory has its roots in the study of Coptic, where in 1944 Hans Jakob Polotsky published a study, Études de syntaxe copte, showing that the Coptic ‘Second Tense’ was consistently used in emphatic sentences, while the ‘First Tense’ was used in non-emphatic sentences. Polotsky extended this same finding to earlier Egyptian, showing that many uses of the ‘imperfective’ sḏm.f form of the Egyptian verb similarly corresponded to emphatic sentences, as did many uses of the sḏm.n.f form. In subsequent publications, Polotsky refined his observations into a new understanding of the Egyptian verbal system. The Standard Theory reached a broader reception in the 1960s, with some, such as Alan Gardiner, arguing against its conclusions. The theory was revised on a more linguistic basis during the 1970s, with further analyses using generative grammar. In 1976, Polotsky published Les transpositions du verbe en égyptien classique, his most complete treatment of the theory as it applied to classical Egyptian. Polotsky's ideas gained widespread acceptance, and in 1983, Egyptologist Leo Depuydt first gave them the name of ‘Standard Theory’.

However, while scholars of Coptic and Late Egyptian firmly adopted Polotsky's views, they eventually came to be questioned by scholars of Old and Middle Egyptian. The consensus surrounding the Standard Theory began to crumble at the 1986 Crossroad Conference on Egyptian Grammar. Heated debate emerged by the subsequent Crossroad II and Crossroad III conferences. Papers directly challenging some of the core assumptions of the Standard Theory began to appear, as Mark Collier and others cast doubt on the adverbial nature of certain verb forms.

As Egyptologists became increasingly aware of new developments in general linguistics and the idiosyncrasies of the Standard Theory in the 1980s, the theory was largely superseded by interpretations of Egyptian syntax in which verbal phrases often retain their full verbal character rather than undergoing ‘transpositions’ in almost all of their uses. More recent trends also pay greater attention to discourse phenomena and pragmatics in analyzing verb forms rather than following a narrowly structural approach. Though the name ‘Standard Theory’ is still commonly used, the theory itself has now largely fallen out of favor as modern Egyptologists have turned to these newer approaches, variously referred to as ‘verbalist’, ‘post-Polotskyan’, or the ‘Not-So-Standard Theory’. Nonetheless, a few scholars have continued to defend the ideas of the Standard Theory against their detractors, and many of Polotsky's discoveries remain widely accepted.

== Theory ==
While there are many variants and further developments of the Standard Theory, the core of the analysis remains Polotsky's treatment of the Egyptian verbal system. Polotsky categorized the various forms of the classical Egyptian verb on the basis of their syntactic substitutability with other kinds of phrases. In so doing, he arrived at three basic categories under which most of the verb forms could be classified:

Adjectival verb forms:

- Active participle
- Passive participle
- Relative form

Substantival verb forms:

- Emphatic sḏm.f
- Emphatic sḏm.n.f
- Infinitive

Adverbial verb forms:

- Circumstantial sḏm.f
- Circumstantial sḏm.n.f
- Circumstantial passive sḏmw.f
- Stative
- ḥr + infinitive
- m + infinitive
- r + infinitive

In Polotsky's analysis, the common particles jw, wn.jn, ꜥḥꜥ.n, and m (this last with an attached suffix pronoun, e.g. m.k, m.ṯn, etc.) are seen as auxiliaries. Together with a following pronoun or noun, they form a substantival element that serves as the subject of a sentence, and they combine with following adverbial verb forms and constructions to form compound verb forms at the start of a syntactic sentence. These compound verb forms are considered ‘First Tense’ forms by analogy with the First Tense in Coptic grammar. The initial clause with a First Tense verb form can then be followed by either a string of coordinate clauses sharing the same auxiliary or by subordinate clauses with circumstantial or prospective verb forms.

Like the First Tense forms, the Second Tenses are also analyzed as consisting of a substantival element as the subject followed by an adverbial element as the predicate. However, in this case the main verb is not part of the adverbial element but the substantival element, as an emphatic (substantival) verb form with a following suffix pronoun or noun. The Second Tense serves to highlight or emphasize the adverbial element by demoting the verb from predicate to subject, nominalizing it.

Another type of sentence, the so-called balanced sentence, is analyzed as two successive substantival elements containing emphatic verb forms, and can thus be seen as a special case of the Egyptian nominal sentence.

== See also ==
- Late Egyptian language
- Appendix:Egyptian predicates on Wiktionary for a summary of one ‘Not-So-Standard Theory’ analysis of Egyptian constructions
