= Marxism: An Historical and Critical Study =

1961 book by George Lichtheim

- Cover of the first edition
- Author: George Lichtheim
- Language: English
- Subject: Marxism
- Published: 1961
- Publisher: Routledge & Kegan Paul Ltd
- Publication place: United States
- Media type: Print (Hardcover and Paperback)
- Pages: 412 (1971 fourth impression)
- ISBN: 978-0710046451

Marxism: An Historical and Critical Study (1961; second edition 1964) is a book by the socialist intellectual George Lichtheim, in which the author provides a study of the development of Marxism from its origins to 1917. It has been seen as a classic work.

== See also ==
- Karl Marx: His Life and Environment
- Karl Marx: His Life and Thought
