= Djadjaemankh =

Fictitious ancient Egyptian magician

Djadjaemankh in hieroglyphs
U28 G1 U28 G1 D1 m S34 N35 Aa1
Djadjaemankh
Ḏ3ḏ3-m-ˁnḫ
Head of life

Djadjaemankh is the name of a fictitious ancient Egyptian magician appearing in the third chapter of a story told in the legendary Westcar Papyrus. He is said to have worked wonders during the reign of king (pharaoh) Sneferu (4th Dynasty).

== The literary person ==
Djadjaemankh appears only in the third story of the Westcar Papyrus – there is no archeological or historical evidence that he existed. Nevertheless, he is object of great interest for Egyptologists, since his magical trick is connected to later cultural perceptions of the personality of king Sneferu. In the story Djadjaemankh is described as a high lector priest.

== The wonder of Djadjaemankh ==
According to the Westcar Papyrus, king Sneferu is in a melancholic mood. He is bored and so he wanders through every room of his palace, to seek some distraction. When unsuccessful, he orders to his servants: "Go and bring the high lector priest and scribe of the books, Djadjaemankh, to me." The summoned is brought to Sneferu at once. Sneferu says to Djadjaemankh: "I have passed every chamber of my palace to find some distraction, but I couldn't find any." Djadjaemankh replies: "May thy majesty go to the lake of the palace, after a barque has been prepared with all the beauties from inside the palace. The heart of highness will be cheering up seeing them rowing to and fro. You will see the beautiful bird's marshes of the lake and their banks then and thine heart will become happy when recognizing their beautiful realms." Sneferu says: "Truly, I shall arrange such a rowing trip. Let me be brought 20 oars made of ebony, decorated with gold, their handles made of seqab-wood, covered with dja'am. Let me also be brought 20 virgin maidens with perfect bodies and well-developed bosoms, compassed with braided hairs. Let them be draped in nets after they have disrobed their clothes." All things Sneferu wished are done. And so they row to and fro and Sneferu's heart is gladdened when he sees the girls row.

Then it happens that the stroke maiden goes through her braids with her fingers and a hair pendant in the shape of a fish, made of malachite, falls into the water of the lake. The stroke maiden becomes silent in shock and grief and stops specifying the clock. Her complete line of rowers becomes silent, too, and they all stop rowing. Sneferu asks: "Shouldn't you row...?" The rowers answer: "Our stroke became silent, without rowing." Sneferu consults the stroke maiden: "That you don't row any further, has which reason?" The woman answers: "This fish-pendant made of fresh beaten malachite is the reason. It fell into the water." Sneferu brings the stroke maiden back to her seat and offers: "Let me give you a duplicate of your pendant as a substitute." The woman says: "I prefer to receive my property back than having a duplicate." The king orders now: "Go and bring the high lector priest Djadjaemankh to me." And Djadjaemankh is brought to Sneferu at once. The ruler says: "Djadjaemankh, my brother, I have done all things that you have advised and the heart of thy majesty was refreshed when seeing the maidens rowing. Then a fish pendant made of fresh beaten malachite, belonging to the stroke maiden, fell into the water. She became silent, without rowing. So it came that she distracted the whole rowing line.

I asked her: 'Why don't you row?' and she said: 'That fish-pendant made of fresh beaten malachite is the reason. It fell into the water.' And I replied to her: 'Row! See, I'm someone who replaces it.' But the maiden said: 'I prefer my own property before some substitute.'" Djadjaemankh utters a secret spell which makes the waters of the lake move, so that one half side of the lake now rests on the other half. The water which had been 12 cubits in height becomes now 24 cubits at one side, whilst the other side is dry now. Djadjaemankh enters the lake's ground and picks up the lost fish-pendant, which was lying on a pot-shard. He brings the amulet back to the stroke maiden and then removes the waters magically back to their original positions. Sneferu spends the rest of the day celebrating together with his royal palace and Djadjaemankh is rewarded generously by the king.

== Modern analysis ==
Egyptologists see an important connection between Djadjaemankh's magic performance and the perception of king Sneferu's personality. Adolf Erman and Kurt Heinrich Sethe once considered the stories of the Westcar Papyrus as mere folklore. They saw literary figures like Djadjaemankh and the other heroes of the Westcar Papyrus as a pure fiction, created only for entertainment, since there is no archeological evidence of them.

Modern Egyptologists such as Verena Lepper and Miriam Lichtheim deny this view and argue that Sethe and Erman may have just failed to see the profundity of such novels. They hold that at one side Sneferu is depicted as generous and kind, while on the other side he shows an accostable character when he addresses a subaltern, namely Djadjaemankh, with "my brother". Both go even further and describe Sneferu as being bawdy when he tells Djadjaemankh how the female rowers shall be dressed and look like. Lepper and Liechtheim evaluate the story of Djadjaemankh as some sort of satire, in which a pharaoh is depicted as a fatuous fool, who is easily pleased with superficial entertainment and unable to solve his problem with a little rowing girl on his own. Furthermore, the author of Djadjaemankh's tale places the main actor intellectually higher than the pharaoh and criticizes the pharaoh with this. Additionally the story of Djadjaemankh shows an unusual writing element: a speech in a speech. Sneferu repeats what he said to the stroke maiden, when he explains his problem to Djadjaemankh. The Westcar Papyrus is the first preserved Egyptian document in which a speech in a speech occurs. Liechtheim and Lepper also point to multiple similar but somewhat later ancient Egyptian writings in which magicians perform very similar magic tricks or make prophecies to a king. Their stories are obviously inspired by the tale of Dedi. Descriptive examples are the papyri pAthen and The prophecy of Neferti. In the Neferti-novel, king Sneferu is also depicted as accostable and here, too, the king addresses a subaltern with "my brother". And again the stories of pAthen and the Neferti-novel both report about a bored pharaoh seeking for distraction. Furthermore, the novels show how popular the theme of prophesying was since the Old Kingdom – just like in the story of the Westcar Papyrus. Since pAthen and The prophecy of Neferti show the same manner of speaking and equal picking up of quaint phrases as the Westcar Papyrus does, Lepper and Liechtheim hold that Djadjaemankh must have been known to Egyptian authors for a surprisingly long time.
