= George Lichtheim =

German-British writer (1912–1973)

- Born: 6 November 1912; Berlin, German Empire
- Died: 22 April 1973 (aged 60); Hampstead, London, United Kingdom
- Relatives: Miriam Lichtheim (sister)
- Writing career
- Pen name: George Arnold
- Language: English

George Lichtheim (1912 – 1973), also known by the pseudonym George Arnold, was a German-born intellectual and writer whose works focused on the history and theory of socialism and Marxism.

== Early life and education ==
George Lichtheim was born on 6 November 1912 in Berlin to Richard Lichtheim and Irene Lichtheim (née Hafter). Lichtheim's father, born in Berlin to a German-Jewish family, was a politician, diplomat, and Zionist. Lichtheim's younger sister was Miriam Lichtheim, an American-Israeli Egyptologist, academic, librarian and translator.

From 1913–1917, Lichtheim lived in Constantinople, Ottoman Empire (present-day, Istanbul, Turkey) as his father was a representative for the World Zionist Organization. In 1917, the Lichtheim family returned to Berlin. In 1918, the Lichtheim family moved to the Netherlands with the intention of migrating to Mandatory Palestine. Around 1921, Lichtheim moved to London whilst his father worked for the Zionist Commission. The Lichtheim family returned to Berlin in 1923.

In 1932, Lichtheim enrolled at Heidelberg University to study law.

== Career ==
Following Hitler's rise to power in 1933, Lichtheim initially fled Germany for London before migrating to Mandatory Palestine in 1934.

In 1946, Lichtheim migrated to the United Kingdom.

He defined himself as a socialist and stated in a 1964 letter to The New York Review of Books that "I am not a liberal and never have been. I find liberalism almost as boring as communism and have no wish to be drawn into an argument over which of these two antiquated creeds is less likely to advance us any further."

His work appeared in the Palestine Post, Commentary, Partisan Review, Dissent, the New Leader, Encounter, the Times Literary Supplement and The New York Review of Books. He also translated Gershom Scholem's Major Trends in Jewish Mysticism.

== Personal life ==
On 22 April 1973, Lichtheim died by suicide in London.

== Selected works ==
- The Pattern of World Conflict (1955)
- Marxism (1961)
- Marxism: An Historical and Critical Study (1964)
- Marxism in Modern France (1966)
- The Concept of Ideology, And Other Essays (1967)
- The Origins of Socialism (1969)
- A Short History of Socialism (1970) ISBN 978-0006540267
- Lukács (Fontana Modern Masters, 1970)
- Imperialism (1971) ISBN 978-0713901979
- From Marx to Hegel (1971)
- Europe in the Twentieth Century (1972)
- Thoughts Among the Ruins: Collected essays on Europe and beyond (1973)
