= Westcar Papyrus =

Ancient Egyptian text

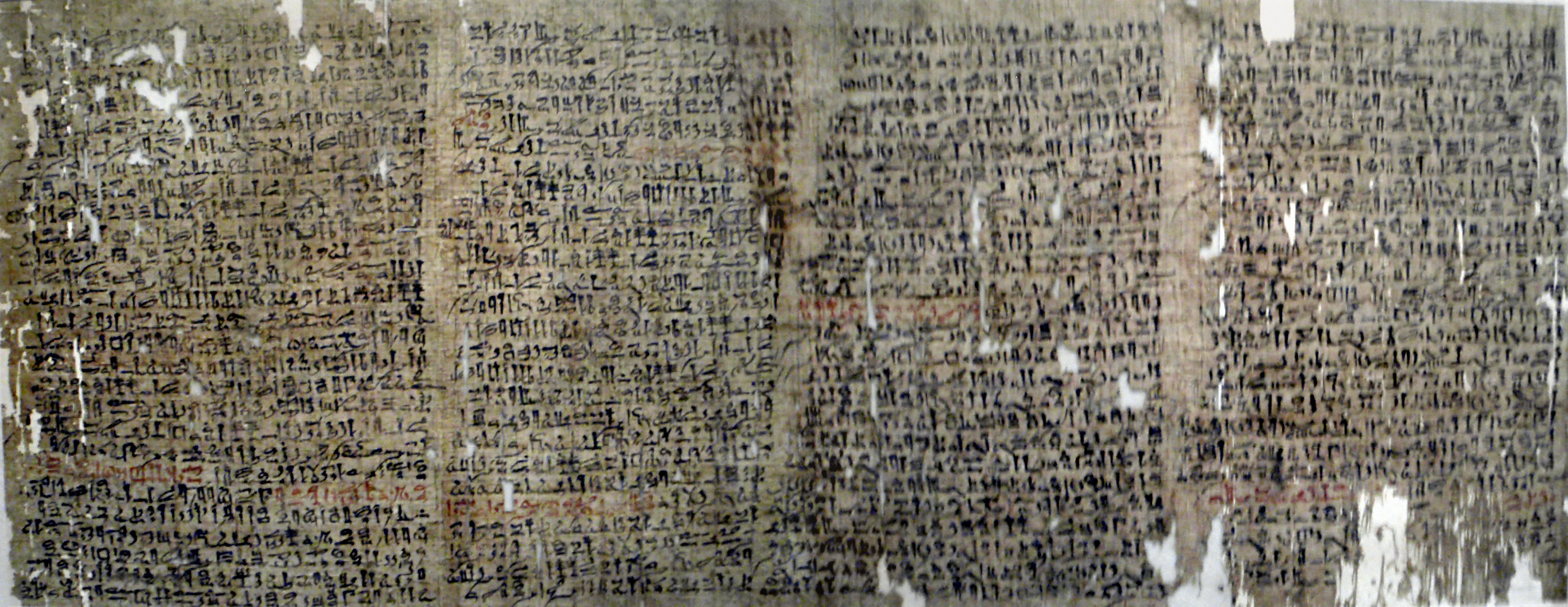
- Westcar Papyrus on display in the Ägyptisches Museum, Berlin
- Created: c. 1650 BC
- Discovered: Egypt
- Discovered by: Henry Westcar
- Present location: Berlin, Germany
- Identification: Papyrus Berlin 3033

The Westcar Papyrus (inventory-designation: Papyrus Berlin 3033) is an ancient Egyptian text containing five stories about miracles performed by priests and magicians. In the papyrus text, each of these tales are told at the royal court of King Khufu (Fourth Dynasty, 26th century BC) by his sons.

The surviving material of the Westcar Papyrus consists of twelve columns written in hieratic script. The document has been dated to the Hyksos period (18th to 16th century BC) and states that it is written in classical Middle Egyptian. Egyptologists think it is possible that the Westcar Papyrus was written during the Thirteenth Dynasty. The papyrus has been used by historians as a literary resource for reconstituting the history of the Fourth Dynasty.

The papyrus is now on display under low-light conditions in the Egyptian Museum of Berlin.

== Discovery ==
In 1823 or 1824, British adventurer Henry Westcar (1798–1868) apparently discovered the papyrus during travels in Egypt. For unknown reasons, he did not note the exact circumstances under which he obtained the artifact.

In 1838 or 1839, German Egyptologist Karl Richard Lepsius claimed to have received the papyrus from Westcar's niece. As Lepsius was able to read some signs of Hieratic, he recognized some of the royal cartouche names of the kings and dated the text to the Old Kingdom.

There are inconsistencies about the true nature of the acquisition and the subsequent whereabouts of the Westcar Papyrus. Lepsius writes that the document was on display in the Oxford Bodleian Library, but public exhibitions have been documented there since the early 1860s and Lepsius' name does not appear in any lists or documents. Furthermore, Lepsius never made the text of the Westcar Papyrus public; he stored the papyrus at home in his attic, where it was found after his death. These inconsistencies have led to widespread speculation; many British historians speculate that Lepsius may have stolen the papyrus.

In 1886, German Egyptologist Adolf Erman purchased the papyrus from Lepsius' son and left it to the Museum of Berlin. As the hieratic signs were still insufficiently investigated and translated, the Westcar Papyrus was displayed as some kind of curiosity. Since Erman's first attempt at a complete translation in 1890, the Westcar Papyrus has been translated numerous times, resulting in different outcomes. The dating of the text also varies.

== Material description ==
Papyrus Westcar is a reused papyrus made of the plant Cyperus papyrus. The scroll of Westcar has been separated into three parts. During the life of Lepsius and Erman it was in two parts; it is not known when and why the scroll was separated into three fragments. The text written on the papyrus includes twelve columns in all. The first part contains on the recto (the front) columns one to three, the second part contains on its recto columns four and five and the third part contains on the verso (the back) columns six to nine and on the recto, the final columns, ten to twelve. The papyrus textile is grainy, of greyish-yellowish colour and very fragile. Part one was fixed onto linen and placed between two glass panes. At five spots the papyrus was fixed to the glass with methyl cellulose. Part two was fixed to a cardboard and wooden plate and is covered by a glass pane. Part three was simply placed between two glass panes and was completely glued to them. The adhesive used for this has partially lost its transparency and a whitish haze has appeared. The edges of all three parts were left free for air circulation. Because of the paper lamination during the eighteenth century, all the papyrus fragments are partially damaged; at several spots the material is torn, distorted, and squashed. Some of the fibres are now lying over the inscription. All of the artifact shows large gaps and the rim of the scrolls is badly frayed. Because of the gaps, many parts of the text are now missing.

The text itself is completely written in black iron gall ink and carbon black ink and divided by rubra into ten paragraphs. Between the neatly written sentences red traces of an older text are visible. It looks as if Papyrus Westcar is a palimpsest; the unknown ancient Egyptian author obviously tried but partially failed to wipe the older text off. The clean and calligraphical handwriting shows that the author was a highly educated professional.

== Context Surrounding the Papyrus ==
These stories come to King Khufu from his sons. Khufu was an actual monarch during the 4th Dynasty, but these stories and the papyrus itself were written in the 13th Dynasty. This retelling of life in the 4th Dynasty does not exist in reality. Rather, these stories are meant to entertain the king. Each son brings a story to the king detailing past events from other kings, works of magicians, and a love affair.

== Contents of the Story ==
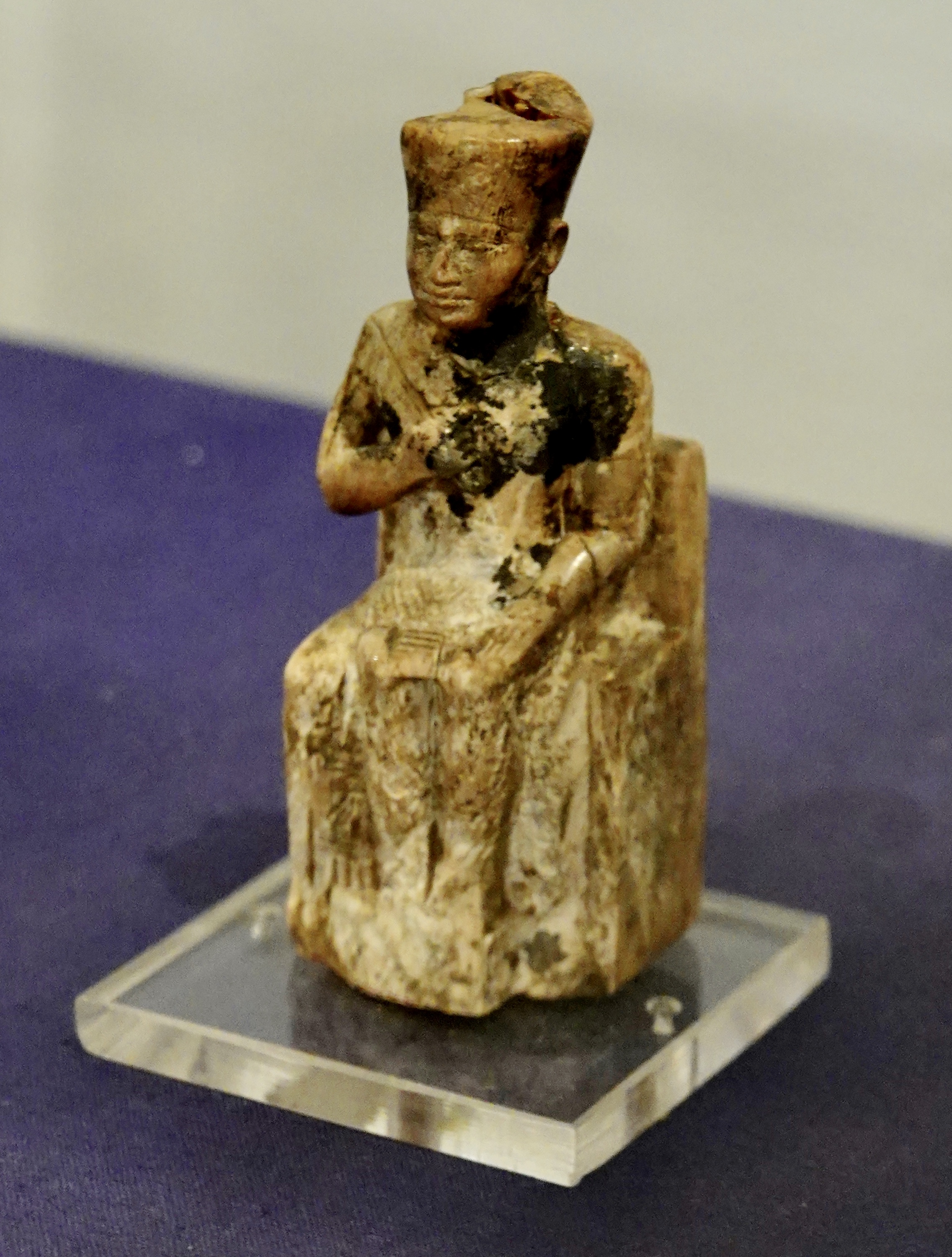
Figure of King Khufu

=== Story No. 1 ===
Very little is left of the first story, only the ending that has been preserved. The first story, told by an unknown son of Khufu (possibly Djedefra) in which Khufu orders blessed offerings to King Djoser. Offerings include items such as bread, beer, an ox, cake and incense. It seems to have been a text detailing a miracle performed by a lector priest in the reign of King Djoser, possibly Imhotep the architect under King Djoser.

=== Story No. 2 ===
The second story, told by Khafre, is set during the reign of one of Khufu's predecessors. King Nebka's chief lector Ubaoner, finds that his wife is having a love affair with a townsman of Memphis. Ubaoner's wife and the commoner had spent a night in the gardens pavilion. A caretaker of Ubaoner reports back details of their night. Upon hearing these details, Ubaoner fashions a crocodile in wax. Ubaoner casts a spell for the figurine to come to life upon contact with water. The spell reads as such.

"As for the man who will come to wash in my pool, you shall seize that commoner in your mouth!"

Ubaoner sets his caretaker to throw the wax crocodile into his pool. Upon catching the townsman, the crocodile takes him to the bottom of the lake, where they remain for seven days as the lector entertains the visiting King Nebka. When he tells Nebka the story, and calls the crocodile up again, Ubaoner orders the crocodile to let go of the commoner. The King remarks that the crocodile is a frightening animal. Nebka orders the crocodile to take the commoner into the water, where they are not seen again. Then he has the adulterous wife brought forth, set on fire, and thrown in the river.

As Khafre finishes the story, Khufu says to offer blessings similar to the first story; beer, bread, an ox, cake, and incense.

=== Story No. 3 ===
The third story, told by another son named Baufra, is set during the reign of his grandfather Sneferu. Sneferu finds himself bored in his palace one day, as he cannot find anything to do. Sneferu calls for chief lector Djadjaemankh. He advises him to gather twenty young women and use them to sail him around the palace lake in his barque. Djadjaemankh proclaims that this will fix Sneferu's boredom, as he will see beautiful sights on his rowing trip. Sneferu orders twenty beautiful oars made of ebony, sandal wood, and gold. Sneferu asks for women who fit certain requirements such as have yet to have children, beautiful limbs and braided hair. He gives the women nets to drape around them as they sail. However, one of the girls loses an amulet after getting her hair caught on an oar - a fish pendant made of turquoise so dear to her that she will not even accept a substitute from the royal treasury, and until it is returned to her neither she nor any of the other women will row, even after the King demands it. Sneferu goes to Djadjaemankh with his problem, asking what he should do. Using magic, Djadjaemankh halves the water in the lake and puts it on top of the other half. After finding the pendant and putting the water back into place, Sneferu rewards Djadjaemankh with everything he has ever wanted.

Repeating the tradition of giving offerings, King Khufu declares bread, an ox, beer, cake, and incense to King Sneferu.

=== Story No. 4 ===
The fourth story, told by Hordjedef, concerns a miracle set within Khufu's own reign. A townsman named Dedi, from a fictional place called Djed-Sneferu is capable of miracles. Hordjedef claims Dedi is over a hundred years old and can eat and drink excessive amounts of food and beer. According to Hordjedef, Dedi has the power to reattach a severed head onto an animal, to tame wild lions, and knows the number of secret rooms in the shrine of Thoth. Khufu wanted to build shrine rooms similar to the ones at Thoth. Intrigued, he sends his son to invite this wise man to the court, and upon Dedi's arrival he orders a goose, an undefined waterbird, and a bull beheaded. Dedi reattaches the heads. Khufu then questions him on his knowledge on the shrine of Thoth, and Dedi answers that he does not know the number of rooms, but he knows where they are. When Khufu asks for the wheres and hows, Dedi answers that he is not the one who can give Khufu access, but the first of the three future kings in the womb of the woman Rededjet is. This is a prophecy detailing the beginnings of the Fifth Dynasty, starting with Userkaf.

=== Story No. 5 ===
The final story breaks from the format and moves the focus to Rededjet giving birth to her three sons. Upon the day of her children's birth, Ra orders Isis, Nephthys, Meskhenet, Heket, and Khnum to aid her. According to Ra, these children are supposed to be great leaders who will worship these gods. They disguise themselves as musicians and hurry to Rededjet's house to help her with the difficult birth. The three children are born, each described as strong and healthy, with limbs covered in gold and wearing headdresses of lapis lazuli. The maidservant of Rededjet later has an argument with her mistress, receives a beating and flees, vowing to tell king Khufu what had happened. But on the way, she meets her brother and tells the story to him. Displeased, he beats her, too, and sends her on a path to the water's edge where a crocodile catches her. The brother then goes to see Rededjet, who is crying over the loss of his sister. The brother starts to confess what has happened and at this point the papyrus story ends.

== Analysis and interpretations ==
The Westcar Papyrus is of great interest to historians and Egyptologists since it is one of the oldest Egyptian documents that contains such complex text. Unfortunately, the name of the author has been lost. The most recent translations and linguistic investigations by Miriam Lichtheim and Verena Lepper reveal interesting writing and spelling elements hidden in the text of the papyrus, which has led them to a new evaluation of the individual stories.

The first story is lost due to damage to the papyrus. The preserved sentences merely reveal the main protagonist of the story, King Djoser. The name of the hero, who is said to have performed the miracle, is completely lost, but it is thought that the Papyrus was talking about the famous architect and high lector priest, Imhotep.

=== Linguistic stylistics and changing tenses ===
The second and third stories are written in a conspicuous and old-fashioned style. The author phrases and makes the heroes' acting stilted and ceremonious. The first three stories are written in past tense and all the kings are addressed with the salutation "justified" (Egyptian: m3ʕ ḫrw), which was typical in Ancient Egypt when talking about a deceased king. The heroes are addressed in the second and third stories the same way. Curiously, all the kings are addressed with their birth name, notwithstanding that this was unusual in the author's lifetime. While deceased kings were normally called by their birth name, living kings were called by their Horus name. King Khufu is nevertheless called by his birth name in the first three stories, yet in the fourth story, he is treated as being still alive and being the main actor. Even the future kings Userkaf, Sahure, and Neferirkare Kakai are called by their birth names. Verena Lepper thinks, that the reason may be some kind of spelling reform that occurred in the lifetime of the author, perhaps trying to fix the spelling rule for naming a deceased king, in order to show that even the future kings in the story were long since dead during his lifetime. For this reason Verena Lepper doubts that the Westcar stories are based on documents originating from the Old Kingdom.

The fourth and fifth stories are written in present tense. The unknown author moves the timeline and also changes his mode of expression from "old-fashioned" into a contemporary form. He clearly distinguishes "long time passed" from "most recently" without cutting the timeline too quickly. The speech of Prince Hordjedef builds the decisive transition: Hordjedef is sick of hearing old, dusty tales that cannot be proven. He explains that a current wonder would be richer in content and more instructive, and so he brings up the story of Dedi. The last section of the fourth story, in which the magician Dedi gives a prophecy to king Khufu, shifts to future tense for a short time, before shifting back to present tense again. This present tense is maintained until the end of the Westcar stories.

=== Depictions of the kings ===
The Westcar Papyrus contains hidden allusions and puns to the characters of the kings Nebka, Sneferu, and Khufu. An evaluation of the character description of Djoser is impossible due to the great deterioration within his story.

In the second story, King Nebka plays the key role. He is depicted as a strict, but lawful judge, who does not allow mischief and misbehaviour to occur. The adulterous wife of the story's hero is punished by being burnt alive and her secret lover, revealed thanks to the loyal caretaker, is eaten alive by a summoned crocodile. Caretaker and crocodile are playing the role of justice, whilst King Nebka plays the role of destiny. Lepper and Liechtheim evaluate the depiction of King Nebka as being fairly positive. A strict but lawful king was ideal for the people of the author's lifetime.

In the third story, King Sneferu becomes a victim of the author's courage to criticize the monarchy. The author depicts Sneferu as a fatuous fool, who is easily pleased with superficial entertainment and who is unable to resolve a dispute with a little rowing maid. Sneferu must go to the extent of having a priest solve the problem. With this narration and embarrassing depiction of a king, the author of Westcar dares to criticise the kings of Egypt as such and makes the third story a sort of satire. Lepper points out that the critiques are hidden cleverly throughout. The Westcar Papyrus may have been made available for public entertainment, or at least, for public study.

In the fourth story, King Khufu is difficult to assess. He is depicted as ruthless: deciding to have a condemned prisoner decapitated to test the alleged magical powers of the magician Dedi. Khufu is also depicted as inquisitive, reasonable and generous: he accepts Dedi's outrage and his offer of an alternative for the prisoner, questions the circumstances and contents of Dedi's prophecy, and rewards the magician generously. The contradictory depiction of Khufu is an object of controversy among Egyptologists and historians to this day. Earlier Egyptologists and historians in particular, such as Adolf Erman, Kurt Heinrich Sethe, and Wolfgang Helck evaluated Khufu's character as heartless and sacrilegious. They lean on the ancient Greek traditions of Herodotus and Diodorus, who described an exaggerated, negative character image of Khufu, ignoring the paradoxical (because positive) traditions the Egyptians always taught. But other Egyptologists such as Dietrich Wildung see Khufu's order as an act of mercy: the prisoner would have received his life back if Dedi had performed his magical trick. Wildung thinks that Dedi's refusal was an allusion to the respect Egyptians showed to human life. The ancient Egyptians were of the opinion that human life should not be misused for dark magic or similar evil things. Lepper and Liechtheim suspect that a difficult-to-assess depiction of Khufu was exactly what the author had planned. He wanted to create a mysterious character.

The fifth and last story tells about the heroine Rededjet (also often read as Ruddedet) and her difficult birth of three sons. The sun god Ra orders his companions Isis, Meskhenet, Hekhet, Nephthys, and Khnum to help Rededjet, to ensure the birth of the triplets and the beginning of a new dynasty. Lepper and Liechtheim both evaluate the story as some kind of narrated moral that deals with the theme of justice and what happens to traitors. Lepper points out, that the story of Rededjet might have been inspired by the historical figure of Khentkaus I, who lived and may have ruled at the end of the Fourth Dynasty. Among the titles discovered to have been given to her is the "mother of two kings". For a long time it had been thought that she may have borne Userkaf and Sahure, but new evidence shows that Sahure, at least, had a different mother (Queen Neferhetepes). The implication from the Westcar Papyrus that the first three kings of the Fifth Dynasty had been siblings, seems incorrect. Since, in the Westcar Papyrus, Rededjet is connected with the role of a future king's mother, the parallels between the biographies of the two ladies has garnered special attention. The role of the maidservant is evaluated as being a key figure for a modern phrasing of indoctrinations about morality and betrayal. The maidservant wants to run her mistress down and is punished by destiny. Destiny is depicted here as a crocodile who snatches the traitor. The whole purpose would be to ensure the beginning of a new dynasty by making the only danger disappear. The author of the Westcar Papyrus artfully creates some kind of happy ending.

=== Ending of Papyrus Westcar ===
Since the first translations of the Westcar Papyrus, historians and Egyptologists have disputed whether the story was finished or unfinished. Earlier evaluations seemed to show an abrupt ending after the death of the traitorous maidservant. But more recently, linguistic investigations made by Verena Lepper and Miriam Liechtheim (especially by Lepper) strengthen the theory that the Westcar text is definitely at an end after the story of the maidservant's death. Lepper points out that the crocodile sequence is repeated several times, like a kind of refrain, which is a typical element in similar stories and documents. Furthermore, Lepper argues that the papyrus has a lot of free space after the apparent ending, enough for another short story.

=== Influences of Papyrus Westcar in later Egyptian tales ===
Verena Lepper and Miriam Lichtheim postulate that the tales of Papyrus Westcar inspired later authors to compose and write down similar tales. They refer to multiple, and somewhat later, ancient Egyptian writings in which magicians perform very similar magic tricks and make prophecies to a king. Descriptive examples are the papyri pAthen and The prophecy of Neferti. These novels show the popular theme of prophesying used during the Old Kingdom – just as in the story of the Westcar Papyrus. They also both talk about subalterns with magical powers similar to those of Dedi's. The Papyrus pBerlin 3023 contains the story, The Eloquent Peasant, in which the following phrase appears: "See, these are artists who create the existing anew, who even replace a severed head", which could be interpreted as an allusion to the Westcar Papyrus. pBerlin 3023 contains another reference that strengthens the idea that many ancient Egyptian writings were influenced by the Westcar Papyrus: column 232 contains the phrase "sleeping until dawn", which appears nearly word-for-word in the Westcar Papyrus.

A further descriptive example appears in The prophecy of Neferti. As in the Westcar Papyrus, a subaltern is addressed by a king as "my brother" and the king is depicted as being accostable and simple-minded. Furthermore, both stories talk about the same king, Sneferu. The Papyrus pAthen contains the phrase: "...for these are the wise who can move waters and make a river flow at their mere will and want...", which clearly refers to the wonder that the magicians Djadjaemankh and Dedi had performed in the Westcar story.

Since pAthen, pBerlin 3023 and The prophecy of Neferti use the same manner of speaking and quaint phrases, complete with numerous allusions to the wonders of Papyrus Westcar, Lepper and Lichtheim hold that Dedi, Ubaoner and Djadjaemankh must have been known to Egyptian authors for a long time.

== See also ==
- List of ancient Egyptian papyri
