= Hans Jakob Polotsky =

Israeli linguist (1905–1991)

- הנס יעקב פולוצקי
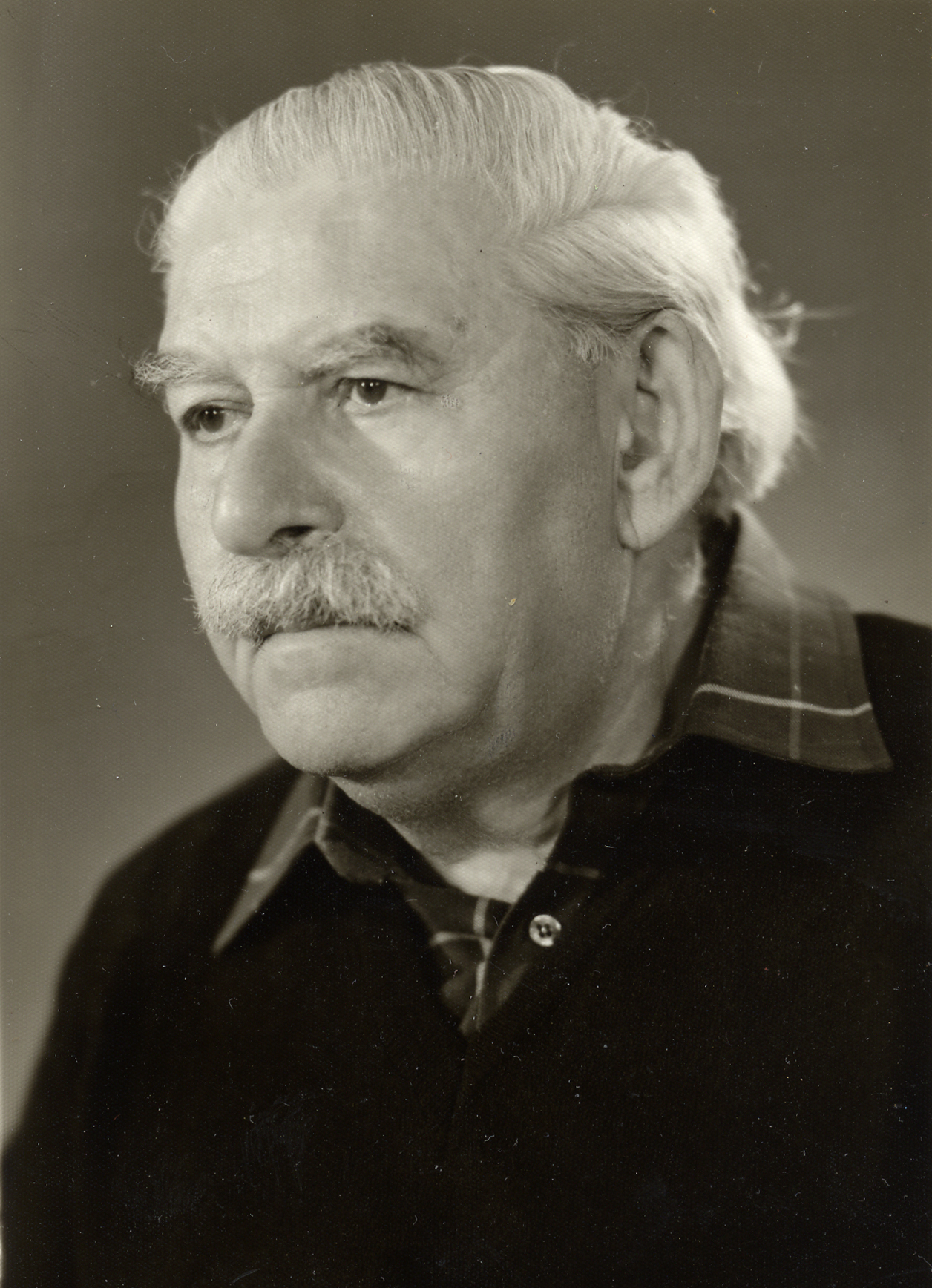
- Born: 13 September 1905; Zurich
- Died: 10 August 1991 (aged 85); Jerusalem
- Occupation: Egyptologist

Hans Jakob Polotsky (Hebrew: הנס יעקב פולוצקי; also Hans Jacob Polotsky, Hans Jakob Polotzky; 13 September 1905 – 10 August 1991) was an Israeli orientalist, linguist, and professor of Semitic languages and Egyptology at the Hebrew University of Jerusalem.

== Biography ==
Polotsky was born in Zürich, Switzerland, as the son of a Belarusian Jewish couple. He grew up in Berlin and studied Egyptology and Semitics at the universities of Berlin and Göttingen. From 1926 to 1931 he was a co-worker of the Septuaginta-Unternehmen of the Academy of Sciences at Göttingen. In 1929 he received his Ph.D. degree for the dissertation Zu den Inschriften der 11. Dynastie. He worked in Berlin editing Coptic Manichaean texts from 1933 till 1934, with the Church historian Carl Schmidt. He left Germany in 1935 and settled in Mandate Palestine, where he taught and researched at the Hebrew University in Jerusalem, becoming professor in 1948. In 1953 he founded the Linguistics department there and later served as the dean of the Faculty of Humanities. He died in Jerusalem.

His main achievement was the Études de syntaxe copte published in 1944 which fundamentally changed the scientific view of the syntax of the Coptic and earlier ancient Egyptian languages. Polotsky's theory of the Egyptian verb (a particularly delicate argument, since Egyptians distinguished their different verb forms mainly by the vocalizations, and vowels were not written) had so much success that it has been called the Standard Theory.

In Berlin, Polotsky had been a student of the famous egyptologist Kurt Heinrich Sethe; in Jerusalem, one of his students was Miriam Lichtheim, known for her extensive translations of ancient Egyptian texts.

== Awards ==
- In 1962, Polotsky received the Rothschild Prize
- In 1966, he was awarded the Israel Prize in the humanities.
- In 1982, he received the Harvey Prize.

== Publications ==
- (with: Carl Schmidt) Ein Mani-Fund in Ägypten, Original-Schriften des Mani und seiner Schüler. Berlin: Akademie der Wissenschaften 1933.
- "Manichäische Studien", in: Le Muséon 46, 1933, pp. 247–271.
- (ed.) Manichäische Homilien. Stuttgart: W. Kohlhammer 1934.
- Manichäische Handschriften der Staatlichen Museen Berlin, W. Kohlhammer Stuttgart: 1935
- "Études de grammaire gouragué", in: Bulletin de la Société de Linguistique de Paris 39, 1938, pp. 137–175
- Études de syntaxe copte, Publications de la Société d'Archéologie Copte. Le Caire, 1944
- "Notes on Gurage grammar", Israel Oriental Society, No. 2, 1951
- "Syntaxe amharique et syntaxe turque", in: Atti del Convegno Internazionale di Studi Etiopici, Roma (Acc. Naz. dei Lincei) 1960:, pp. 117–121
- "Studies in Modern Syriac", in Journal of Semitic Studies 6, 1961, pp. 1–32
- "Aramaic, Syriac, and Ge'ez", in: Journal of Semitic Studies 9, 1964, pp. 1–10
- "Egyptian Tenses", The Israel Academy of Sciences and Humanities, Vol. II, No. 5. 1965
- E.Y. Kutscher (ed.), Collected Papers by H.J. Polotsky Magnes Press, Jerusalem 1971
- "Les transpositions du verbe en égyptien classique", in Israel Oriental Studies 6, 1976, pp. 1–50
- "A Point of Arabic Syntax: The Indirect Attribute", in Israel Oriental Studies 8, 1978, pp. 159–174.
- "Verbs with two Objects in Modern Syriac (Urmi)", in Israel Oriental Studies 9, 1979, pp. 204–227.
- Grundlagen des koptischen Satzbaus, Scholars Press, Decatur, Ga., 1987, ISBN 1-55540-076-0
- "Incorporation in Modern Syriac", in G. Goldenberg & Sh. Raz (eds.), Semitic and Cushitic studies. Harrassowitz Wiesbaden 1994, pp. 90–102.
- "Notes on Neo-Syriac Grammar", in Israel Oriental Studies 16, 1996, pp. 11–48.

== See also ==
- List of Israel Prize recipients
