= Verena Lepper =

Verena M. Lepper (born 1973 in Mönchengladbach) is a German Egyptologist and Semitist.

== Life ==
After graduating from Kaiser-Karls-Gymnasium in 1992, the daughter of the Aachen city archive director Herbert Lepper studied Egyptology, Semitic studies, languages and cultures of the Christian Orient as well as Old Testament sciences in Bonn, Cologne, Tuebingen and Oxford. She completed her doctoral studies at the universities of Bonn and Harvard. From 1993 to 2004 she was a scholarship holder of the German Academic Scholarship Foundation and received her doctorate in 2005 from the University of Bonn with a thesis on the Westcar Papyrus. She then worked as a postdoctoral fellow at the universities of Bonn, Harvard, and Oxford, including as part of the project the Aramaeo-Jewish Community of Elephantine funded by the German Research Foundation (DFG). Since 2008, Lepper has been the curator of the Egyptian-Oriental papyrus collection of the Egyptian Museum and Papyrus Collection of Berlin. Since the summer semester of 2011, she has also been a lecturer in Egyptology at the Free University of Berlin, and in February 2013 she was appointed honorary professor for Egyptian and Oriental papyri and manuscripts of the theological faculty of the Humboldt University of Berlin.

In August 2025, the J. Paul Getty Museum announced the appointment of Prof. Lepper to the position of Anissa and Paul John Balson II Senior Curator of Antiquities. Prof. Lepper will oversee the Getty Villa Museum’s antiquities collection, programming, and curatorial staff.

Lepper's research focuses on Egyptian and Oriental papyrus research, literature, religion, and language as well as the history of art, culture, and science. She has published numerous books and essays on these topics. At the end of 2014, Lepper received an ERC Starting Grant worth 1.5 million euros for five years from the European Research Council (ERC) for her research project Localizing 4000 Years of Cultural History. Texts and Scripts from Elephantine Island in Egypt. With ten project employees, she carried out interdisciplinary research in collaboration with the technical and natural sciences. The project found its conclusion in the exhibition Elephantine. Island of the Millennia as a special exhibition of the Egyptian Museum and Papyrus Collection – Berlin State Museums in cooperation with the Arab-German Young Academy of Sciences and Humanities (AGYA) in April 2024.

At the Humboldt University of Berlin, in cooperation with the state museums in Berlin, she also founded a New Institute for Ancient Near Eastern and Hellenistic Religious History (IAHRG), on whose board she serves.

From 2006 to 2011, Lepper was a member of the Young Academy at the Berlin-Brandenburg Academy of Sciences and the German National Academy of Sciences Leopoldina. As part of the 2008-2009 program, she was an associate of the Stiftung Neue Verantwortung, Berlin. From 2009 to 2011 she was a member of the scientific advisory board on Small Academic Disciplines of the German Rectors' Conference (HRK). In 2013, Lepper founded the bilateral Arab-German Young Academy of Sciences and Humanities (AGYA), which she has directed at the Berlin-Brandenburg Academy of Sciences since then. Lepper is involved in various committees for science policy and cultural diplomacy. In June 2017 she was awarded the Golden Plate Award by the Egyptian Academy of Scientific Research and Technology (ASRT) in Cairo. Since 2009 he was a Young Leader of Atlantik-Brücke and a full member since 2018. In 2011, Verena Lepper was honoured as one of the "100 Women of Tomorrow" by the "Deutschland – Land der Ideen" initiative of the Federal Government and the Federation of German Industries. She was also named "2013 Young Scientist" by the World Economic Forum in recognition of her scientific and curatorial achievements in the field of Egyptology. Lepper is a board member of the Harvard Club Berlin and a liaison lecturer at the German Studienstiftung. Visiting professorships and lectureships took her to the universities of Harvard and Princeton. She was able to realize various interdisciplinary special exhibitions nationally (Berlin, Bonn) and internationally (e.g. Abu Dhabi, Doha, Harvard).

She is a member of the Association of Scientific Catholic Student Associations Unitas.

Since August 2025, Prof. Lepper is a member of the board of the Foundation Committee of the Georg-August-University Goettingen, the central supervisory and advisory body of this university.

== Works ==
- Markus Witte, Jens Schröter & Verena Lepper (eds.): Torah, Temple, Land. Constructions of Judaism in Antiquity, Texts and Studies in Ancient Judaism;, Tübingen 2021, 320p.
- Verena M. Lepper (ed.): Cinderella, Sinbad & Sinuhe. Arabic-German narrative traditions, Berlin 2019, 360pp.
- Verena M. Lepper, Peter Deuflhard, Christoph Markschies (eds.): Spaces - Images - Cultures, publication of the Berlin-Brandenburg Academy of Sciences, De Gruyter Verlag, Berlin 2015, 205 pp.
- Verena M. Lepper (ed.): Personalities from Ancient Egypt in the New Museum;, Michael Imhof Verlag, Berlin 2014, 192 pp.
- with Roland Enmarch (ed.): Ancient Egyptian Literature. Theory and Practice; (= Proceedings of the British Academy 188) Oxford University Press / British Academy 2013, ISBN 978-0-19-726542-0
- (Ed.):Research in the papyrus collection. A celebration for the New Museum, Egyptian and Oriental Papyri and Manuscripts of the Egyptian Museum and Papyrus Collection Berlin, Vol. 1, Akademie Verlag, Berlin 2012, ISBN 978-3-05-006039-2
- with Ingelore Hafemann (ed.): Karl Richard Lepsius. The founder of German Egyptology, Kadmos Kulturverlag, Berlin 2012, ISBN 978-3-86599-176-8
- (Ed.), Text: Richard Parkinson, Photographs: Lisa Baylis: Four 12th Dynasty Literary Papyri (Pap. Berlin P. 3022-5). A photographic Record, Akademie Verlag, Berlin 2012, ISBN 978-3-05-005856-6
- with Christina Hanus among others: Trailblazers of Egyptology. Carl Richard Lepsius 1810-1884, State Museums in Berlin, Berlin 2010, ISBN 978-3-88609-691-6
- Investigations on pWestcar. A philological and literary (re-)analysis; with an audio Mp3 file of the performance of the text on CD-ROM&, Harrassowitz Verlag, Wiesbaden 2008, ISBN 978-3-447-05651-9 (= dissertation)
- with Leo Depuydt (ed.): H. J. Polotsky: Scripta posteriora on Egyptian and Coptic, Seminar for Egyptology and Coptology, Göttingen 2007
- (Ed.): "After Polotsky". New research and trends in Egyptian and Coptic linguistics, Seminar for Egyptology and Coptology, Göttingen 2006
