= Miriam Lichtheim =

Turkish-born American-Israeli egyptologist (1914–2004)

- מרים ליכטהיים
- Born: May 3, 1914; Constantinople, Ottoman Empire
- Died: March 27, 2004 (aged 89); Jerusalem, Israel
- Citizenship: Palestinian, 1935–1948; Israeli, 1948– American, 1950–
- Occupations: Egyptologist; academic; librarian; translator
- Father: Richard Lichtheim
- Relatives: George Lichtheim (brother)

Academic background
- Education: Hebrew University; Oriental Institute, University of Chicago

Academic work
- Institutions: Yale University; University of California, Los Angeles; Hebrew University of Jerusalem

Miriam Lichtheim (Hebrew: מרים ליכטהיים ; 3 May 1914 – 27 March 2004) was an American-Israeli Egyptologist, academic, librarian, and translator.

== Biography ==
Miriam Lichtheim was born on May 3, 1914 in Constantinople, Ottoman Empire (now Istanbul, Turkey) to Richard Lichtheim and Irene Lichtheim (née Hafter). Lichtheim's father, born in Berlin to a German-Jewish family, was a politician, diplomat, and Zionist. Lichtheim's mother was born in Constantinople to a Greek speaking Sephardic Jewish family. Lichtheim's older brother was George Lichtheim, a British Marxist journalist.

From 1913 to 1917, Miriam's father Richard Lichtheim was the successor to Victor Jacobson, representative of the Zionist World Organization in Istanbul. Due to suspicions of espionage, the Lichtheim family returned to Germany in 1919 following the end of World War I.

In 1934, the family emigrated to Mandatory Palestine. On 26 December 1935, Lichtheim became a naturalised Palestinian citizen. Lichtheim studied under Hans Jakob Polotsky in the Hebrew University in Jerusalem. In a paper of recollections about her teacher, she recalls that, at the beginning of the year, in Polotsky's Egyptian class there were four students; at the end, only she remained. During Miriam's time at the Hebrew University, her father Richard became the representative of the World Zionist Organisation at the League of Nations, and relocated to Geneva with Irene. They would return in 1946 following the end of World War II and the independence of Israel.

After completing her studies, Miriam travelled to the United States in 1941 where she studied and received a PhD in Egyptology from the University of Chicago Oriental Institute. She worked as an academic librarian first at Yale University, and then at the University of California, Los Angeles, where she was Near East Bibliographer and Lecturer until her retirement in 1974. Lichtheim became a naturalised American citizen on 15 August 1950.

In 1982 she returned to Israel, where she taught at her old school the Hebrew University of Jerusalem. She died in 2004.

== Works ==
In 1973, she published the first volume of the Ancient Egyptian Literature (abbr. AEL), annotated translations of Old and Middle Kingdom texts. In this work, she describes the genesis and evolution of different literary genres in Egypt, based on ostraca, inscriptions engraved in stone, and texts of papyri. In 1976, the second volume of AEL containing New Kingdom texts appeared, followed in 1980 by the third dealing with the first millennium BCE literature. These widely used anthologies became classics in the field of Egyptology, portraying the evolution of literature in ancient Egypt.

== Publications (selection) ==
- With Elizabeth Stefanski, 1952: Coptic Ostraca from Medinet Habu. Oriental Institute Publications 71. Chicago: The University of Chicago Press.
- 1963: "Ancient Egypt: A survey of current historiography", The American Historical Review 69 (1), 30–46. DOI: 10.2307/1904412.
- 1973–1980 (and reprints): Ancient Egyptian literature. A book of readings, 3 volumes, The University of California Press Volume 1, Volume 2 & Volume 3
- 1983: Late Egyptian wisdom literature in the international context: a study of Demotic instructions. Orbis Biblicus et Orientalis 52. Freiburg (Schweiz); Göttingen: Universitätsverlag; Vandenhoeck & Ruprecht.
- 1976: Ancient Egyptian Literature: Volume II: The New Kingdom, The University of California Press, 1976
- 1980: Ancient Egyptian Literature: Volume III: The Late Period The University of California Press. 1980
- 1988: Ancient Egyptian autobiographies chiefly of the Middle Kingdom: A study and an anthology. Orbis Biblicus et Orientalis 84. Freiburg (Schweiz); Göttingen: Universitätsverlag; Vandenhoeck & Ruprecht.
- 1992: Maat in Egyptian Autobiographies and Related Studies. Orbis Biblicus et Orientalis 120. Freiburg (Schweiz); Göttingen: Universitätsverlag; Vandenhoeck & Ruprecht.
- 1997: Moral Values in Ancient Egypt. Orbis Biblicus et Orientalis 155. Freiburg (Schweiz); Göttingen: Universitätsverlag; Vandenhoeck & Ruprecht.
- 1999: Telling it Briefly: A Memoir of My Life. Freiburg (Schweiz): Universitätsverlag.
