= Kurt Sethe =

German Egyptologist (1869–1934)

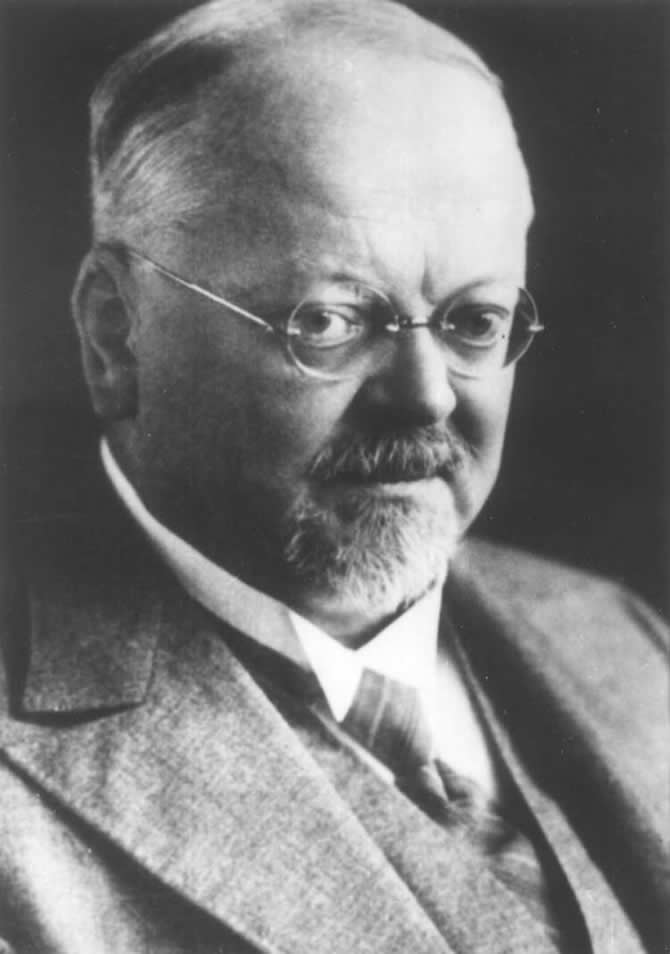
Kurt Heinrich Sethe (circa 1920).

Kurt Heinrich Sethe (30 September 1869 – 6 July 1934) was a German Egyptologist and philologist from Berlin. He was a student of Adolf Erman. Sethe collected numerous texts from Egypt during his visits there and edited the Urkunden des ægyptischen Altertums which is a standard catalogue of Ancient Egyptian literature and text.

== Career ==
Among Sethe's many contributions to Egyptology, two are singled out by Gardiner (p. 433): "...the pronunciation of Middle Egyptian... The chief authorities to be consulted are Sethe's great work on the Egyptian verb, and a much later brilliant article entitled Die Vokalisation des Ägyptischen in Zeitschrift der deutschen morgenländischen Gesellschaft" (1923). Actually, Sethe was the first one to put forth a systematic theory of the Egyptian verb; it was no easy accomplishment, since the inflection of the Egyptian verb was done mainly by changing the vowels, and the Egyptians only wrote consonants.

Among Sethe's students were Hans Jakob Polotsky and Alan Gardiner. Sethe's anthology, Aegyptische Lesestuecke, is still used by some beginners in the study of the language. Sethe also published a comprehensive collection of Egyptian epigraphy, which he called Urkunden der Aegyptologie.
