= Henni von Halle =

German Egyptologist (1878–1964)

- Born: Henriette Emma Gertrud von Mossner; 1 January 1878; Berlin, German Empire
- Died: 2 January 1964 (aged 86); Nußloch, West Germany
- Occupation: Egyptologist
- Spouse: Ernst von Halle
- Children: 3
- Parents: Walther von Mossner (father); Meta Giebert (mother)

Henriette "Henni" Emma Gertrud von Halle (née von Mossner) was a German Egyptologist.

== Biography ==
Henni von Halle was born in Berlin on 1 January 1878 to Walther von Mossner, Prussian general of cavalry and former aide-de-camp to Wilhelm II, and Meta Giebert. She married Ernst von Halle (née Levy) (born 1808, died 28 June 1909), Professor of Political Economy in Berlin, and they had two sons and a daughter.

Henni von Halle taught herself the ancient Egyptian language, which is attested to in the letter she first wrote to Adolf Erman in 1914, where she asked for the recommendation of a teacher or a textbook to continue her studies. His response was at first curt, but he later recommended his student Amalie Hertz as a teacher. She also attended seminars at the universities in Berlin, Strasbourg and Heidelberg. In 1915, Erman invited von Halle to work on his Wörterbuch der ägyptischen Sprache, which she continued to work on with Erman and Hermann Grapow until 1933. She also worked with Wilhelm Spiegelberg, copying Theban ostraca and graffiti.

In 1920, with rising inflation, von Halle had to sell her house in Berlin and undertook several jobs on different Egyptology projects. From December 1922 and July 1925 she worked for Abraham Shalom Yahuda. From 1 August 1925 to November 1928, she was employed by Hermann Ranke on Die ägyptischen Personennamen. In late 1928, she moved back to Berlin and is recorded sporadically in the payment records of Die ägyptischen Personennamen from 1929 to 1933.

After 1933, she is not found in the archive records. She stayed in Berlin until December 1943, then returned to Heidelberg and died in Nußloch on 2 January 1964.

While she did not publish anything on her own, both Erman and Ranke laud her work in their prefaces. Erman also dedicated Aegyptisches handwörterbuch to her and Caroline Ransom Williams, though the two women seem to have never met. She was frequently added to lists of German Egyptologists and was referred to as an Egyptologist by Erman; however, von Halle never referred to herself as such.

== See also ==
- Wörterbuch der ägyptischen Sprache
- Adolf Erman
