= Egyptian language =

Extinct language that was spoken and written in Egypt

Egyptian
r Z1 n km m t O49
r n km.t
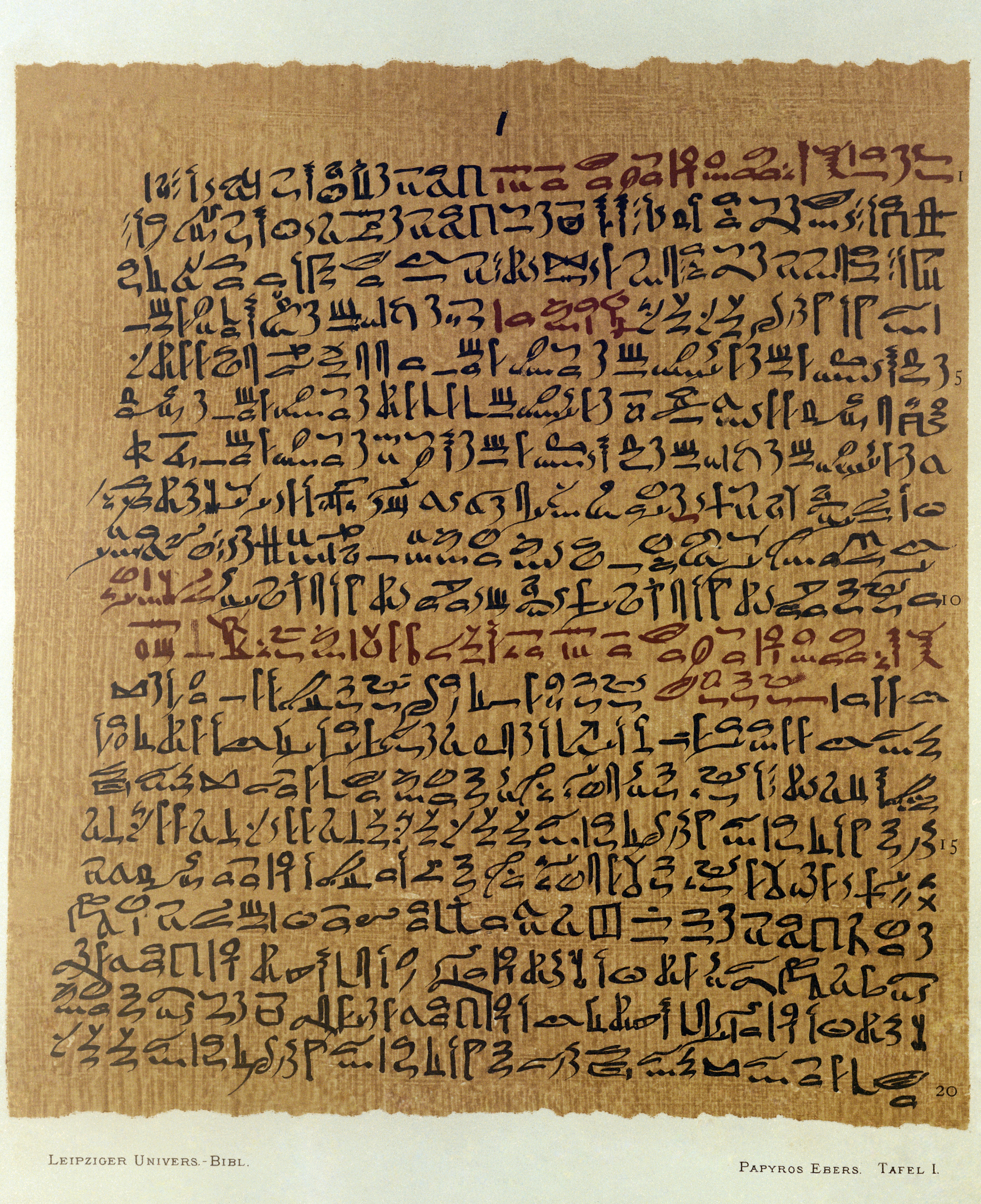
- Ebers Papyrus detailing treatment of asthma (written in hieratic)
- Region: Originally, throughout ancient Egypt and parts of Nubia (especially during the times of the Nubian kingdoms)
- Ethnicity: Ancient Egyptians
- Era: Late fourth millennium BC – 19th century AD (Note: The language may have survived in isolated pockets in Upper Egypt as late as the 19th century, according to Quibell, James Edward (1901). "When did Coptic become extinct?". Zeitschrift für ägyptische Sprache und Altertumskunde. 39: 87. In the village of Pi-Solsel (Az-Zayniyyah, El Zenya or Al Zeniya north of Luxor), passive speakers were recorded as late as the 1930s, and traces of traditional vernacular Coptic reported to exist in other places such as Abydos and Dendera, see Vycichl, Werner (1936). "Pi-Solsel, ein Dorf mit koptischer Überlieferung" [Pi-Solsel, a village with Coptic tradition] (PDF). Mitteilungen des Deutschen Archäologischen Instituts, Abteilung Kairo (in German). 6: 169–175.) (with the extinction of Coptic); still used as the liturgical language of the Coptic Orthodox and Coptic Catholic Churches
- Language family: Afro-Asiatic: Egyptian
- Dialects: ?Upper †; ?Lower †; Coptic dialects †
- Writing system: Hieroglyphs, cursive hieroglyphs, Hieratic, Demotic and Coptic (later, occasionally, Arabic script in government translations and Latin script in scholars' transliterations and several hieroglyphic dictionaries)

Language codes
- ISO 639-2: egy (also cop for Coptic)
- ISO 639-3: egy (also cop for Coptic)
- Glottolog: egyp1246
- Linguasphere: 11-AAA-a

The Egyptian language, or ancient Egyptian (r n kmt; (Note: Whence the designation Kemic for Egypto-Coptic with km.t */kū́m˘t/ "black land, Egypt", as opposed to ṭšr.t "red land, desert". Proposed by Schenkel (1990:1). Note that the name r n km.t is only attested in versions of the Story of Sinuhe and appears to have been a literary invention.) 'speech of Egypt'), is an extinct branch of the Afro-Asiatic language family that was spoken in Egypt. It is one of the earliest known written languages, first recorded in the hieroglyphic script in the late 4th millennium BC, and the longest-attested human language with a written record spanning over 5,000 years. Its classical form, known as "Middle Egyptian," was the vernacular language of the Middle Kingdom of ancient Egypt, and remained the literary language of Egypt until its Christianisation during the Roman period. It is known today from a large corpus of surviving texts, which were deciphered in the early 19th century.

By the time of classical antiquity, the spoken language had evolved into Demotic. By the Roman and Byzantine eras, the language later further diversified into various Coptic dialects written in the Greek alphabet. These were eventually supplanted by Arabic after the Arab conquest of Egypt, although Bohairic Coptic remains in use as the liturgical language of the Coptic Orthodox and Coptic Catholic churches.

== Classification ==
The Egyptian language branch belongs to the Afroasiatic language family. Among the typological features of Egyptian that are typically Afroasiatic are its fusional morphology, nonconcatenative morphology, a series of emphatic consonants, a three-vowel system /a i u/, a nominal feminine suffix *-at, a nominal prefix m-, an adjectival suffix -ī and characteristic personal verbal affixes. Of the other Afroasiatic branches, linguists have variously suggested that the Egyptian language shares its greatest affinities with Berber and Semitic languages, particularly Arabic (which is spoken in Egypt today) and Hebrew. However, other scholars have argued that the Egyptian language shared closer linguistic ties with northeastern African regions.

There are two theories that seek to establish the cognate sets between Egyptian and Afroasiatic, the traditional theory and the neuere Komparatistik, founded by Semiticist Otto Rössler. According to the neuere Komparatistik, in Egyptian, the Proto-Afroasiatic voiced consonants */d z ð/ developed into pharyngeal ⟨ꜥ⟩ /ʕ/: Egyptian ꜥr.t 'portal', Semitic dalt 'door'. The traditional theory instead disputes the values given to those consonants by the neuere Komparatistik, instead connecting ⟨ꜥ⟩ with Semitic /ʕ/ and /ɣ/. Both schools agree that Afroasiatic */l/ merged with Egyptian ⟨n⟩, ⟨r⟩, ⟨ꜣ⟩, and ⟨j⟩ in the dialect on which the written language was based, but it was preserved in other Egyptian varieties. They also agree that original */k g ḳ/ palatalise to ⟨ṯ j ḏ⟩ in some environments and are preserved as ⟨k g q⟩ in others.

The Egyptian language has many biradical and perhaps monoradical roots, in contrast to the Semitic preference for triradical roots. Egyptian is probably more conservative, and Semitic likely underwent later regularizations converting roots into the triradical pattern.

Although Egyptian is the oldest Afroasiatic language documented in written form, its morphological repertoire is very different from that of the rest of the Afroasiatic languages in general, and Semitic languages in particular. There are multiple possibilities: perhaps Egyptian had already undergone radical changes from Proto-Afroasiatic before it was recorded; or the Afroasiatic family has so far been studied with an excessively Semitocentric approach; or, as G. W. Tsereteli suggests, Afroasiatic is a sprachbund, rather than a true genetic language family.

== History ==
The Egyptian language can be grouped thus:

- Egyptian
  - Earlier Egyptian, Older Egyptian, or Classical Egyptian
    - Old Egyptian
      - Early Egyptian, Early Old Egyptian, Archaic Old Egyptian, Pre-Old Egyptian, or archaic Egyptian
      - standard Old Egyptian
    - Middle Egyptian
  - Later Egyptian
    - Late Egyptian
    - Demotic Egyptian
    - Coptic

The Egyptian language is conventionally grouped into six major chronological divisions:

- Archaic Egyptian (before c. 2600 BC), the reconstructed language of the Early Dynastic Period,
- Old Egyptian (c. 2600 – c. 2000 BC), the language of the Old Kingdom,
- Middle Egyptian (c. 2000 – c. 1350 BC), the language of the Middle Kingdom to early New Kingdom and continuing on as a literary language into the 4th century AD,
- Late Egyptian (c. 1350 – c. 700 BC), Amarna period to Third Intermediate Period,
- Demotic Egyptian (c. 700 BC – c. 400 AD), the vernacular of the Late Period, Ptolemaic and early Roman Egypt,
- Coptic (after c. 200 AD), the vernacular at the time of Christianisation, and the liturgical language of Egyptian Christianity.

Old, Middle, and Late Egyptian were all written using both the hieroglyphic and hieratic scripts. Demotic is the name of the script derived from the hieratic beginning in the 7th century BC.

The Coptic alphabet was derived from the Greek alphabet, with adaptations for Egyptian phonology. It was first developed in the Ptolemaic period, and gradually replaced the Demotic script in about the 4th to 5th centuries of the Christian era.

Diagram showing the use of the various lects of Egyptian by time period and linguistic register

=== Old Egyptian ===
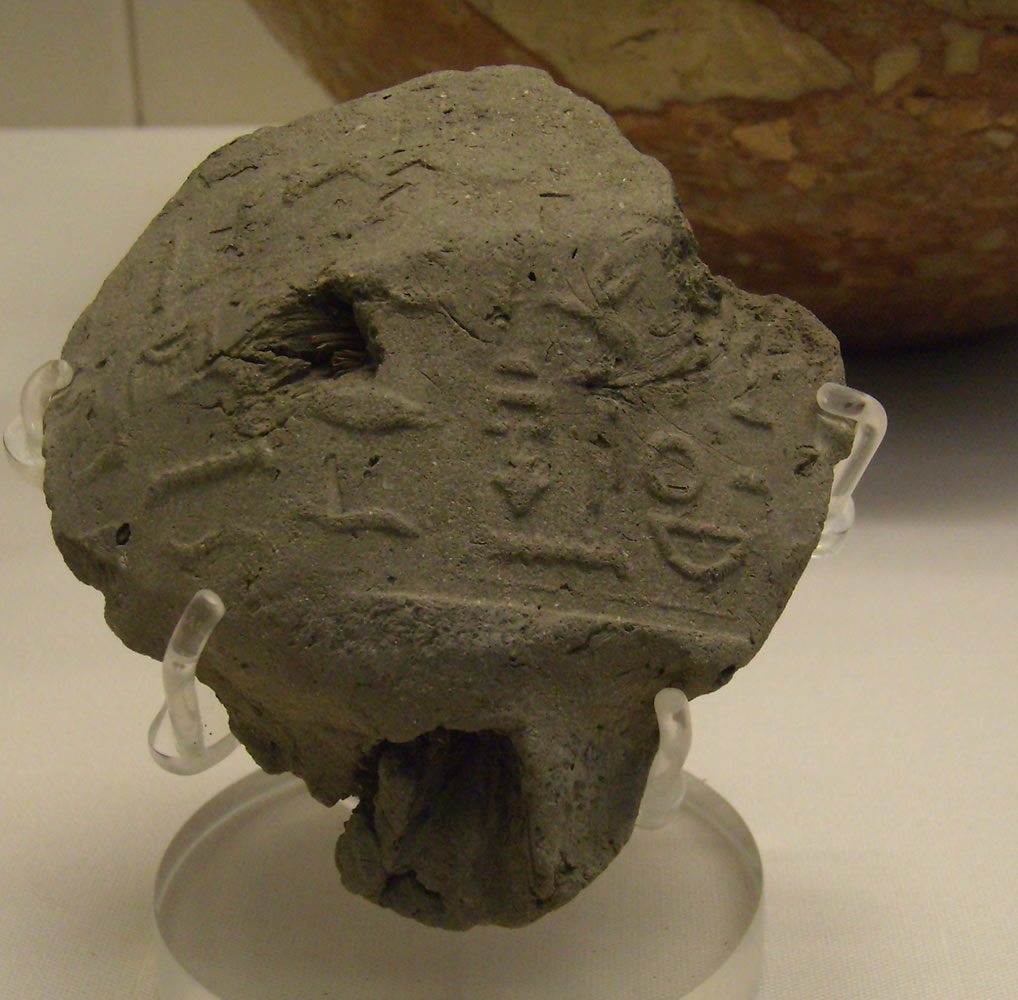
Seal impression from the tomb of Seth-Peribsen, containing the oldest known complete sentence in Egyptian, c. 2690 BC

The term "Archaic Egyptian" is sometimes reserved for the earliest use of hieroglyphs, from the late fourth through the early third millennia BC. At the earliest stage, around 3300 BC, hieroglyphs were not a fully developed writing system, being at a transitional stage of proto-writing; over the time leading up to the 27th century BC, grammatical features such as nisba formation can be seen to occur.

Old Egyptian is dated from the oldest known complete sentence, including a finite verb, which has been found. Discovered in the tomb of Seth-Peribsen (dated c. 2690 BC), the seal impression reads:

| d D n f | N19 n | G38 f | M23 L2 t t | O1 F34 s n |
| d(m)ḏ.n.f | tꜣ-wj n | zꜣ.f | nsw.t-bj.t(j) | pr-jb.sn(j) |
| unite.PRF.he | land.two for | son.his | sedge-bee | house-heart.their |
"He has united the Two Lands for his son, Dual King Peribsen."

Extensive texts appear from about 2600 BC. An early example is the Diary of Merer. The Pyramid Texts are the largest body of literature written in this phase of the language. One of its distinguishing characteristics is the tripling of ideograms, phonograms, and determinatives to indicate the plural. Overall, it does not differ significantly from Middle Egyptian, the classical stage of the language, though it is based on a different dialect.

In the period of the 3rd dynasty (c. 2650 – c. 2575 BC), many of the principles of hieroglyphic writing were regularized. From that time on, until the script was supplanted by an early version of Coptic (about the third and fourth centuries), the system remained virtually unchanged. Even the number of signs used remained constant at about 700 for more than 2,000 years.

=== Middle Egyptian ===
Middle Egyptian was spoken for about 700 years, beginning around 2000 BC, during the Middle Kingdom and the subsequent Second Intermediate Period. As the classical variant of Egyptian, Middle Egyptian is the best-documented variety of the language, and has attracted the most attention by far from Egyptology. While most Middle Egyptian is seen written on monuments by hieroglyphs, it was also written using a cursive variant, and the related hieratic.

Middle Egyptian first became available to modern scholarship with the decipherment of hieroglyphs in the early 19th century. The first grammar of Middle Egyptian was published by Adolf Erman in 1894, surpassed in 1927 by Alan Gardiner's work. Middle Egyptian has been well-understood since then, although certain points of the verbal inflection remained open to revision until the mid-20th century, notably due to the contributions of Hans Jakob Polotsky.

The Middle Egyptian stage is taken to have ended around the 14th century BC, giving rise to Late Egyptian. This transition was taking place in the later period of the Eighteenth Dynasty of Egypt (known as the Amarna Period).

==== Egyptien de tradition ====
Original Old Egyptian and Middle Egyptian texts were still used after the 14th century BCE. And an emulation of predominately Middle Egyptian, but also with characteristics of Old Egyptian, Late Egyptian and Demotic, called "Égyptien de tradition" or "Neo-Middle Egyptian" by scholars, was used as a literary language for new texts since the later New Kingdom in official and religious hieroglyphic and hieratic texts in preference to Late Egyptian or Demotic. Égyptien de tradition as a religious language survived until the Christianisation of Roman Egypt in the 4th century.

=== Late Egyptian ===
Late Egyptian was spoken for about 650 years, beginning around 1350 BC, during the New Kingdom of Egypt. Late Egyptian succeeded but did not fully supplant Middle Egyptian as a literary language, and was also the language of the New Kingdom administration.

Texts written wholly in Late Egyptian date to the Twentieth Dynasty of Egypt and later. Late Egyptian is represented by a large body of religious and secular literature, comprising such examples as the Story of Wenamun, the love poems of the Chester–Beatty I papyrus, and the Instruction of Any. Instructions became a popular literary genre of the New Kingdom, which took the form of advice on proper behavior. Late Egyptian was also the language of New Kingdom administration.

Late Egyptian is not completely distinct from Middle Egyptian, as many "classicisms" appear in historical and literary documents of this phase. Some scholars use the term "Medio-Late Egyptian" to describe an early form of Late Egyptian featuring many Middle Egyptian forms and syntactic elements and retaining a generally Middle Egyptian orthography, as used in e.g. the Boundary Stelae of Akhenaten and the Tale of the Doomed Prince. However, the difference between Middle and Late Egyptian is greater than the difference between Middle and Old Egyptian. Originally a synthetic language, Egyptian by the Late Egyptian phase had become an analytic language. The relationship between Middle Egyptian and Late Egyptian has been described as being similar to that between Latin and Italian.

- Written Late Egyptian was seemingly a better representative than Middle Egyptian of the spoken language in the New Kingdom and beyond: weak consonants ꜣ, w, j, as well as the feminine ending .t were increasingly dropped, apparently because they stopped being pronounced.
- The demonstrative pronouns pꜣ (masc.), tꜣ (fem.), and nꜣ (pl.) were used as definite articles.
- The old form sḏm.n.f (he heard) of the verb was replaced by sḏm-f which had both prospective (he shall hear) and perfective (he heard) aspects. The past tense was also formed using the auxiliary verb jr (make), as in jr.f saḥa.f (he has accused him).
- Adjectives as attributes of nouns are often replaced by nouns.

The Late Egyptian stage is taken to have ended around the 8th century BC, giving rise to Demotic.

=== Demotic ===
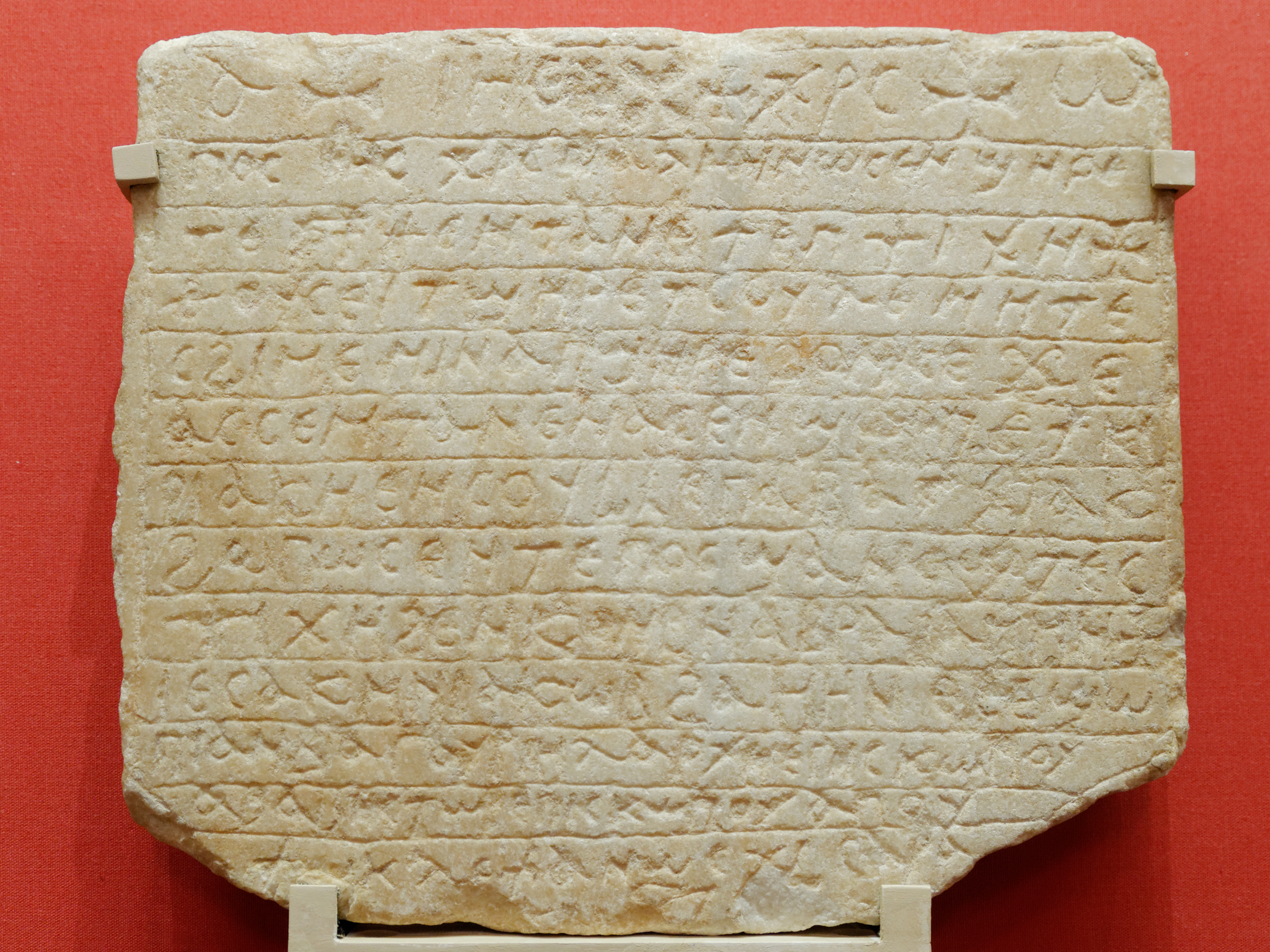
10th century stela with Coptic inscription, in the Louvre

Demotic is a later development of the Egyptian language written in the Demotic script, following Late Egyptian and preceding Coptic, the latter of which it shares much with. In the earlier stages of Demotic, such as those texts written in the early Demotic script, it probably represented the spoken idiom of the time. However, as its use became increasingly confined to literary and religious purposes, the written language diverged more and more from the spoken form, leading to significant diglossia between the late Demotic texts and the spoken language of the time, similar to the use of classical Middle Egyptian during the Ptolemaic Period.

=== Coptic ===
Coptic is the name given to the late Egyptian vernacular when it was written in a Greek-based alphabet, the Coptic alphabet; it flourished from the time of Early Christianity (c. 31/33–324), but Egyptian phrases written in the Greek alphabet first appeared during the Hellenistic period c. 3rd century BC, with the first known Coptic text, still pagan (Old Coptic), from the 1st century AD.

Coptic survived into the medieval period, but by the 16th century was dwindling rapidly due to the persecution of Coptic Christians under the Mamluks. It probably survived in the Egyptian countryside—spoken by Muslims and Christians alike—as a spoken language for several centuries after that. Coptic survives as the liturgical language of the Coptic Orthodox Church and the Coptic Catholic Church.

== Dialects ==
Some evidence of dialectal variation in Egyptian is found in as early as the 3rd millennium BC. However, because the hieroglyphic script is inherently conservative and most hieroglyphic Egyptian texts are written in a literary prestige register rather than the vernacular speech variety of their author, the dialectical differences are not apparent in written Egyptian until the adoption of the Coptic alphabet. Nevertheless, it is clear that these differences existed before the Coptic period. In one Late Egyptian letter (dated c. 1200 BC), a scribe jokes that his colleague's writing is incoherent like "the speech of a Delta man with a man of Elephantine."

Recently, some evidence of internal dialects has been found in pairs of similar words in Egyptian that, based on similarities with later dialects of Coptic, may be derived from northern and southern dialects of Egyptian. Written Coptic has five major dialects, which differ mainly in graphic conventions, most notably the southern Saidic dialect, the main classical dialect, and the northern Bohairic dialect, currently used in Coptic Church services.

== Phonology ==
While the consonantal phonology of the Egyptian language may be reconstructed, the exact phonetics is unknown, and there are varying opinions on how to classify the individual phonemes. In addition, because ancient Egyptian is recorded over a full 2,000 years, the Archaic and Late stages being separated by the amount of time that separates Old Latin from Modern Italian, significant phonetic changes must have occurred during that lengthy time frame.

Phonologically, Egyptian contrasted labial, alveolar, palatal, velar, uvular, pharyngeal, and glottal consonants. Egyptian also contrasted voiceless and emphatic consonants, as with other Afroasiatic languages, but exactly how the emphatic consonants were realised is unknown. Early research had assumed that the opposition in stops was one of voicing, but it is now thought to be either one of tenuis and emphatic consonants, as in many Semitic languages, or one of aspirated and ejective consonants, as in many Cushitic languages. (Note: See Peust (1999), for a review of the history of thinking on the subject; his reconstructions of words are nonstandard.)

Since vowels were not written until Coptic, reconstructions of the Egyptian vowel system are much more uncertain and rely mainly on evidence from Coptic and records of Egyptian words, especially proper nouns, in other languages/writing systems.

The actual pronunciations reconstructed by such means are used only by a few specialists in the language. For all other purposes, the Egyptological pronunciation is used, but it often bears little resemblance to what is known of how Egyptian was pronounced.

=== Old Egyptian ===
==== Consonants ====
The following consonants are reconstructed for Archaic (before 2600 BC) and Old Egyptian (2686–2181 BC), with IPA equivalents in square brackets if they differ from the usual transcription scheme:

Early Egyptian consonants
| | | Labial | Alveolar | Post- alveolar | Palatal | Velar | Uvular | Pharyn- geal | Glottal |
|---|---|---|---|---|---|---|---|---|---|
| Nasal | | m | n | | | | | | |
| Plosive | voiceless | p | t | | ṯ [c] | k | | | ʔ |
| Plosive | voiced | b | | | | | | | |
| Plosive | ejective | | d [tʼ] | | ḏ [cʼ] | g [kʼ] | q [qʼ] | | |
| Fricative | voiceless | f | s | š [ʃ] | ẖ [ç] | | ḫ [χ] | ḥ [ħ] | h |
| Fricative | voiced | | | | | | | Ꜥ [ʕ] | |
| Fricative | ejective | | z [sʼ] | | | | | | |
| Approximant | | w | l | | j | | | | |
| Trill | | | r | | | | ꜣ [ʀ] | | |
Note: The following consonants traditionally transcribed as voiced are likely to have been unvoiced ejectives: d, z, ḏ, g. The same applies to the consonant q.

/l/ has no independent representation in the hieroglyphic orthography, and it is frequently written as if it were /n/ or /r/. That is probably because the standard for written Egyptian is based on a dialect in which /l/ had merged with other sonorants. Also, the rare cases of /ʔ/ occurring are not represented. The phoneme /j/ is written as ⟨j⟩ in the initial position (⟨jt⟩ = */ˈjaːtVj/ 'father') and immediately after a stressed vowel (⟨bjn⟩ = */ˈbaːjin/ 'bad') and as ⟨jj⟩ word-medially immediately before a stressed vowel (⟨ḫꜥjjk⟩ = */χaʕˈjak/ 'you will appear') and are unmarked word-finally (⟨jt⟩ = /ˈjaːtVj/ 'father').

=== Middle Egyptian ===
In Middle Egyptian (2055–1650 BC), a number of consonantal shifts take place. By the beginning of the Middle Kingdom period, /z/ and /s/ had merged, and the graphemes ⟨s⟩ and ⟨z⟩ are used interchangeably. In addition, /j/ had become /ʔ/ word-initially in an unstressed syllable (⟨jwn⟩ /jaˈwin/ > */ʔaˈwin/ "colour") and after a stressed vowel (⟨ḥjpw⟩ */ˈħujpVw/ > /ˈħeʔp(Vw)/ '[the god] Apis').

=== Late Egyptian ===
In Late Egyptian (1069–700 BC), the phonemes d ḏ g gradually merge with their counterparts t ṯ k (⟨dbn⟩ */ˈdiːban/ > Akkadian transcription ti-ba-an 'dbn-weight'). Also, ṯ ḏ often become /t d/, but they are retained in many lexemes; ꜣ becomes /ʔ/; and /t r j w/ become /ʔ/ at the end of a stressed syllable and eventually null word-finally: ⟨pḏ.t⟩ */ˈpiːɟat/ > Akkadian transcription -pi-ta 'bow'.

=== Demotic ===
==== Phonology ====
The most important source of information about Demotic phonology is Coptic. The consonant inventory of Demotic can be reconstructed on the basis of evidence from the Coptic dialects. Demotic orthography is relatively opaque. The Demotic "alphabetical" signs are mostly inherited from the hieroglyphic script, and due to historical sound changes they do not always map neatly onto Demotic phonemes. However, the Demotic script does feature certain orthographic innovations, such as the use of the sign h̭ for /ç/, which allow it to represent sounds that were not present in earlier forms of Egyptian.

The Demotic consonants can be divided into two primary classes: obstruents (stops, affricates and fricatives) and sonorants (approximants, nasals, and semivowels). Voice is not a contrastive feature; all obstruents are voiceless and all sonorants are voiced. Stops may be either aspirated or tenuis (unaspirated), although there is evidence that aspirates merged with their tenuis counterparts in certain environments.

The following table presents the consonants of Demotic Egyptian. The reconstructed value of a phoneme is given in IPA transcription, followed by a transliteration of the corresponding Demotic "alphabetical" sign(s) in angle brackets ⟨ ⟩.

Demotic Egyptian consonants
| | | Labial | Alveolar | | Postalv. | Palatal | Velar | Pharyng. | Glottal |
|---|---|---|---|---|---|---|---|---|---|
| Nasal | | /m/ | /n/ | | | | | | |
| Obstruent | aspirate | /pʰ/ ⟨p⟩ | /tʰ/ ⟨t ṯ⟩ | | /t͡ʃʰ/ ⟨ṯ⟩ | /cʰ/ ⟨k⟩ | /kʰ/ ⟨k⟩ | | |
| Obstruent | tenuis | | /t/ ⟨d ḏ t ṯ ṱ⟩ | | /t͡ʃ/ ⟨ḏ ṯ⟩ | /c/ ⟨g k q⟩ | /k/ ⟨q k g⟩ | | |
| Obstruent | fricative | /f/ ⟨f⟩ | /s/ ⟨s⟩ | | /ʃ/ ⟨š⟩ | /ç/ ⟨h̭ ḫ⟩ | /x/ ⟨ẖ ḫ⟩ | /ħ/ ⟨ḥ⟩ | /h/ ⟨h⟩ |
| Approximant | | /β/ ⟨b⟩ | /r/ ⟨r⟩ | /l/ ⟨l r⟩ | | /j/ ⟨y ı͗⟩ | /w/ ⟨w⟩ | /ʕ/ ⟨ꜥ⟩ (Note: /ʕ/ was lost near the end of the Ptolemaic period.) | |

Demotic–Coptic sound correspondences
| Demotic spelling | Demotic phoneme | Coptic reflexes | | | | | | | | |
| Demotic spelling | Demotic phoneme | Old Coptic (Note: The term Old Coptic refers to any Coptic texts produced before the standardization of the Coptic alphabet and the emergence of the major literary dialects. These texts exhibit a variety of orthographic and dialectal features and notably make use of several letters of Demotic origin which are not found in the standard Coptic script. The minor dialects P and I are sometimes grouped under the Old Coptic umbrella, however, strictly speaking Dialect I is written with a modified version of the Sahidic alphabet which it shares with Akhmimic, rather than a genuine Old Coptic system.) | Bohairic | Fayyumic | Mesokemic | Sahidic | Dialect P | Lycopolitan | Dialect I | Akhmimic |
|---|---|---|---|---|---|---|---|---|---|---|
| m | */m/ | ⲙ /m/ | ⲙ /m/ | | | | | | | |
| n | */n/ | ⲛ, ⲻ, ⲳ /n/ | ⲛ /n/ | | | | | | | |
| p | */pʰ/ | ⲡ /p/ | ⲫ /pʰ/ | ⲡ /p/ | ⲡ /p/ | ⲡ /p/ | ⲡ /p/ | ⲡ /p/ | ⲡ /p/ | ⲡ /p/ |
| t, ṯ | */tʰ/ | ⲧ /t/ | ⲑ /tʰ/ | ⲧ /t/ | ⲧ /t/ | ⲧ /t/ | ⲧ /t/ | ⲧ /t/ | ⲧ /t/ | ⲧ /t/ |
| ṯ | */t͡ʃʰ/ | ⳗ, ⳙ /t͡ʃ/ | ϭ /t͡ʃʰ/ | ϫ /t͡ʃ/ | ϫ /t͡ʃ/ | ϫ /t͡ʃ/ | ϫ /t͡ʃ/ | ϫ /t͡ʃ/ | ϫ /t͡ʃ/ | ϫ /t͡ʃ/ |
| k | */cʰ/ | ϭ /c/ | ϭ /t͡ʃʰ/ | ϭ /c/ | ϭ /c/ | ϭ /c/ | ⲕ /c/ | ϭ /c/ | ϭ /c/ | ϭ /c/ |
| k | */kʰ/ | ⲹ, ⲕ /k/ | ⲭ /kʰ/ | ⲕ /k/ | ⲕ /k/ | ⲕ /k/ | ⲹ /k/ | ⲕ /k/ | ⲕ /k/ | ⲕ /k/ |
| p | *[p] (Note: [p] is an allophone of /pʰ/ in Demotic.) | ⲡ /p/ | ⲡ /p/ | | | | | | | |
| d, ḏ, t, ṯ, ṱ | */t/ | ⲧ /t/ | ⲧ /t/ | | | | | | | |
| ḏ | */t͡ʃ/ | ⳗ, ⳙ /t͡ʃ/ | ϫ /t͡ʃ/ | | | | | | | |
| g, k, q | */c/ | ⳛ, ϭ, ⲕ /c/ | ϫ /t͡ʃ/ | ϭ /c/ | ϭ /c/ | ϭ /c/ | ⲕ /c/ | ϭ /c/ | ϭ /c/ | ϭ /c/ |
| q, k, g | */k/ | ⲹ, ⲕ /k/ | ⲕ /k/ | ⲕ /k/ | ⲕ /k/ | ⲕ /k/ | ⲹ /k/ | ⲕ /k/ | ⲕ /k/ | ⲕ /k/ |
| f | */f/ | ϥ /f/ | ϥ /f/ | | | | | | | |
| s | */s/ | ⲥ /s/ | ⲥ /s/ | | | | | | | |
| š | */ʃ/ | ϣ, ⳅ, ⳇ /ʃ/ | ϣ /ʃ/ | | | | | | | |
| h̭, ḫ | */ç/ | ⳓ, ⳋ /ç~ʃ/ | ϣ /ʃ/ | ϣ /ʃ/ | ϣ /ʃ/ | ϣ /ʃ/ | ⳋ /ç/ | ϣ /ʃ/ | ⳃ, ϣ /ç~ʃ/ | ⳉ /x/ |
| ẖ, ḫ | */x/ | ϧ /x/ | ϧ /x/ | ϩ /h/ | ϩ /h/ | ϩ /h/ | ϧ /x/ | ϩ /h/ | ⳉ /x/ | ⳉ /x/ |
| ḥ | */ħ/ | ⳕ, ϩ, ⳍ /ħ~h/ | ϩ /h/ | | | | | | | |
| h | */h/ | ⳏ /h/ | ϩ /h/ | | | | | | | |
| b | */β/ | ⲃ /β/ | ⲃ /β/ | | | | | | | |
| r | */r/ | ⲣ /r/ | ⲣ /r/ | ⲗ /l/, ⲣ /r/ | ⲣ /r/ | ⲣ /r/ | ⲣ /r/ | ⲣ /r/ | ⲣ /r/ | ⲣ /r/ |
| l, r | */l/ | ⲗ /l/ | ⲗ /l/ | | | | | | | |
| y, ı͗ | */j/ | (ⲉ)ⲓ /j/ | (ⲉ)ⲓ /j/ | | | | | | | |
| w | */w/ | (ⲟ)ⲩ /w/ | (ⲟ)ⲩ /w/ | | | | | | | |
| ꜥ | */ʕ/ | ⲵ, ∅ /ʔ~∅/ | ∅ | | | | | | | |

=== Coptic ===
More changes occur in the 1st millennium BC and the first centuries AD, leading to Coptic (1st or 3rd – c. 19th centuries AD). In Sahidic ẖ ḫ ḥ had merged into ϣ š (most often from ḫ) and ϩ /h/ (most often ẖ ḥ). Bohairic and Akhmimic are more conservative and have a velar fricative /x/ (ϧ in Bohairic, ⳉ in Akhmimic). Pharyngeal *ꜥ had merged into glottal /ʔ/ after it had affected the quality of the surrounding vowels. /ʔ/ is not indicated orthographically unless it follows a stressed vowel; then, it is marked by doubling the vowel letter (except in Bohairic): Akhmimic ⳉⲟⲟⲡ /xoʔp/, Sahidic and Lycopolitan ϣⲟⲟⲡ šoʔp, Bohairic ϣⲟⲡ šoʔp 'to be' < ḫpr.w */ˈχapraw/ 'has become'. (Note: There is evidence of Bohairic having a phonemic glottal stop: Loprieno (1995:44).) The phoneme ⲃ /b/ was probably pronounced as a fricative [β], becoming ⲡ /p/ after a stressed vowel in syllables that had been closed in earlier Egyptian (compare ⲛⲟⲩⲃ < */ˈnaːbaw/ 'gold' and ⲧⲁⲡ < */dib/ 'horn'). The phonemes /d g z/ occur only in Greek loanwords, with rare exceptions triggered by a nearby /n/: ⲁⲛⲍⲏⲃⲉ/ⲁⲛⲥⲏⲃⲉ < ꜥ.t n.t sbꜣ.w 'school'.

Earlier *d ḏ g q are preserved as ejective t' c' k' k' before vowels in Coptic. Although the same graphemes are used for the pulmonic stops (⟨ⲧ ϫ ⲕ⟩), the existence of the former may be inferred because the stops ⟨ⲡ ⲧ ϫ ⲕ⟩ /p t c k/ are allophonically aspirated [pʰ tʰ cʰ kʰ] before stressed vowels and sonorant consonants. In Bohairic, the allophones are written with the special graphemes ⟨ⲫ ⲑ ϭ ⲭ⟩, but other dialects did not mark aspiration: Sahidic ⲡⲣⲏ, Bohairic ⲫⲣⲏ 'the sun'. (Note: In other dialects, the graphemes are used only for clusters of a stop followed by /h/ and were not used for aspirates: see Loprieno (1995:248).)

Thus, Bohairic does not mark aspiration for reflexes of older *d ḏ g q: Sahidic and Bohairic ⲧⲁⲡ */dib/ 'horn'. Also, the definite article ⲡ is unaspirated when the next word begins with a glottal stop: Bohairic ⲡ + ⲱⲡ > ⲡⲱⲡ 'the account'.

The consonant system of Coptic is as follows:

Coptic consonants
| | | Labial | Dental | Palatal | Velar | Glottal |
|---|---|---|---|---|---|---|
| Nasal | | ⲙ m | ⲛ n | | | |
| Plosive | voiceless | ⲡ (ⲫ) p (pʰ) | ⲧ (ⲑ) t (tʰ) | ϫ (ϭ) c (cʰ) | ⲕ (ⲭ) k (kʰ) | (Note: Various orthographic representations; see above.) ʔ |
| Plosive | ejective | | ⲧ tʼ | ϫ cʼ | ⲕ kʼ | |
| Plosive | voiced | | ⲇ d | | ⲅ ɡ | |
| Fricative | voiceless | ϥ f | ⲥ s | ϣ ʃ | (ϧ, ⳉ) (x) | ϩ h |
| Fricative | voiced | ⲃ β | ⲍ z | | | |
| Approximant | | (ⲟ)ⲩ w | ⲗ l | (ⲉ)ⲓ j | | |
| Trill | | | ⲣ r | | | |

=== Vowels ===
Here is the vowel system reconstructed for earlier Egyptian:

Earlier Egyptian vowel system
| | Front | Back |
|---|---|---|
| Close | i iː | u uː |
| Open | a aː | |

Vowels are always short in unstressed syllables (⟨tpj⟩ = */taˈpij/ 'first') and long in open stressed syllables (⟨rmṯ⟩ = */ˈraːmac/ 'man'), but they can be either short or long in closed stressed syllables (⟨jnn⟩ = */jaˈnan/ 'we', ⟨mn⟩ = */maːn/ 'to stay').

In the Late New Kingdom, after Ramses II, around 1200 BC, */ˈaː/ changes to */ˈoː/ (like the Canaanite shift), ⟨ḥrw⟩ '(the god) Horus' */ħaːra/ > */ħoːrə/ (Akkadian transcription: -ḫuru). */uː/, therefore, changes to */eː/: ⟨šnj⟩ 'tree' */ʃuːn(?)j/ > */ʃeːnə/ (Akkadian transcription: -sini).

In the Early New Kingdom, short stressed */ˈi/ changes to */ˈe/: ⟨mnj⟩ "Menes" */maˈnij/ > */maˈneʔ/ (Akkadian transcription: ma-né-e). Later, probably 1000–800 BC, a short stressed */ˈu/ changes to */ˈe/: ⟨ḏꜥn.t⟩ "Tanis" */ˈɟuʕnat/ was borrowed into Hebrew as *ṣuʕn but would become transcribed as ⟨ṣe-e'-nu/ṣa-a'-nu⟩ during the Neo-Assyrian Empire.

Unstressed vowels, especially after a stress, become */ə/: ⟨nfr⟩ 'good' */ˈnaːfir/ > */ˈnaːfə/ (Akkadian transcription -na-a-pa). */iː/ changes to */eː/ next to /ʕ/ and /j/: ⟨wꜥw⟩ 'soldier' */wiːʕiw/ > */weːʕə/ (earlier Akkadian transcription: ú-i-ú, later: ú-e-eḫ).

Egyptian vowel system c. 1000 BC
| | Front | Central | Back |
|---|---|---|---|
| Close | iː | | |
| Mid | e eː | ə | oː |
| Open | a | | |

In Sahidic and Bohairic Coptic, Late Egyptian stressed */ˈa/ becomes */ˈo/ and */ˈe/ becomes /ˈa/, but are unchanged in the other dialects:

- ⟨sn⟩ */san/ 'brother'
  Sahidic and Bohairic ⟨son⟩
  Akhmimic, Lycopolitan and Fayyumic ⟨san⟩
- ⟨rn⟩ 'name' */rin/ > */ren/
  Sahidic and Bohairic ⟨ran⟩
  Akhmimic, Lycopolitan and Fayyumic ⟨ren⟩

However, in the presence of guttural fricatives, Sahidic and Bohairic preserve */ˈa/, and Fayyumic renders it as ⟨e⟩:

- ⟨ḏbꜥ⟩ 'ten thousand' */cʼaˈbaʕ/
  Sahidic, Akhmimic and Lycopolitan ⟨tba⟩
  Bohairic ⟨tʰba⟩
  Fayyumic ⟨tbe⟩

In Akhmimic and Lycopolitan, */ˈa/ becomes /ˈo/ before etymological /ʕ, ʔ/:

- ⟨jtrw⟩ 'river' */ˈjatraw/ > */jaʔr(ə)/
  Sahidic ⟨eioor(e)⟩
  Bohairic ⟨ior⟩
  Akhmimic ⟨ioore, iôôre⟩
  Fayyumic ⟨iaal, iaar⟩

Similarly, the diphthongs */ˈaj/, */ˈaw/, which normally have reflexes /ˈoj/, /ˈow/ in Sahidic and are preserved in other dialects, are in Bohairic ⟨ôi⟩ (in non-final position) and ⟨ôou⟩ respectively:

- "to me, to them"
  Sahidic ⟨eroi, eroou⟩
  Akhmimic and Lycopolitan ⟨arai, arau⟩
  Fayyumic ⟨elai, elau⟩
  Bohairic ⟨eroi, erôou⟩

Sahidic and Bohairic preserve */ˈe/ before /ʔ/ (etymological or from lenited /t r j/ or tonic-syllable coda /w/),: Sahidic and Bohairic ⟨ne⟩ /neʔ/ 'to you (fem.)' < */ˈnet/ < */ˈnic/. */e/ may also have different reflexes before sonorants, near sibilants and in diphthongs.

Old */aː/ surfaces as /uː/ after nasals and occasionally other consonants: ⟨nṯr⟩ 'god' */ˈnaːcar/ > /ˈnuːte/ ⟨noute⟩ /uː/ has acquired phonemic status, as is evidenced by minimal pairs like 'to approach' ⟨hôn⟩ /hoːn/ < */ˈçaːnan/ ẖnn vs. 'inside' ⟨houn⟩ /huːn/ < */ˈçaːnaw/ ẖnw. An etymological */uː/ > */eː/ often surfaces as /iː/ next to /r/ and after etymological pharyngeals: ⟨hir⟩ < */χuːr/ 'street' (Semitic loan).

Most Coptic dialects have two phonemic vowels in unstressed position. Unstressed vowels generally became /ə/, written as ⟨e⟩ or null (⟨i⟩ in Bohairic and Fayyumic word-finally), but pretonic unstressed /a/ occurs as a reflex of earlier unstressed */e/ near an etymological pharyngeal, velar or sonorant ('to become many' ⟨ašai⟩ < ꜥšꜣ */ʕiˈʃiʀ/) or an unstressed */a/. Pretonic [i] is underlyingly /əj/: Sahidic 'ibis' ⟨hibôi⟩ < h(j)bj.w */hijˈbaːj?w/.

Thus, the following is the Sahidic vowel system c. AD 400:

Sahidic vowel system c. 400 AD
| | Stressed | | Unstressed |
| | Front | Back | Central |
|---|---|---|---|
| Close | iː | uː | |
| Mid | e eː | o oː | ə |
| Open | a | | |

=== Phonotactics ===
Earlier Egyptian has the syllable structure CV(ː)(C) in which V is long in open stressed syllables and short elsewhere. In addition, CVːC or CVCC can occur in word-final, stressed position. However, CVːC occurs only in the infinitive of biconsonantal verbal roots, CVCC only in some plurals.

In later Egyptian, stressed CVːC, CVCC, and CV become much more common because of the loss of final dentals and glides.

=== Stress ===
Earlier Egyptian stresses one of the last two syllables. According to some scholars, that is a development from a stage in Proto-Egyptian in which the third-last syllable could be stressed, which was lost as open posttonic syllables lost their vowels: */ˈχupiraw/ > */ˈχupraw/ 'transformation'.

=== Egyptological pronunciation ===
As a convention, Egyptologists make use of an "Egyptological pronunciation" in English: the consonants are given fixed values, and vowels are inserted according to essentially arbitrary rules. Two of these consonants known as Alef and Ayin are generally pronounced as the vowel /ɑː/. Yodh is pronounced /iː/, w /uː/. Between other consonants, /ɛ/ is then inserted. Thus, for example, the Egyptian name Ramesses is most accurately transliterated as rꜥ-ms-sw ("Ra is the one who bore him") and pronounced as /rɑmɛssu/.

In transcription, ⟨a⟩, ⟨i⟩, and ⟨u⟩ all represent consonants. For example, the name Tutankhamun (1341–1323 BC) was written in Egyptian as twt-ꜥnḫ-jmn ("living image of Amun"). Experts have assigned generic sounds to these values as a matter of convenience, which is an artificial pronunciation and should not be mistaken for how Egyptian was ever pronounced at any time. So although twt-ꜥnḫ-ı͗mn is pronounced /tuːtɑːnximɛn/ in modern Egyptological pronunciation, in his lifetime, it was likely to be pronounced something like *[təˈwaːtəʔ ˈʕaːnəχ ʔaˈmaːnəʔ], transliterable as *təwā́təʾ-ʿā́nəx-ʾamā́nəʾ.

== Writing systems ==
Most surviving texts in the Egyptian language are written on stone in hieroglyphs. The native name for Egyptian hieroglyphic writing is zẖꜣ n mdw-nṯr ("writing of the gods' words"). In antiquity, most texts were written on the quite perishable medium of papyrus though a few have survived that were written in hieratic and (later) demotic. There was also a form of cursive hieroglyphs, used for religious documents on papyrus, such as the Book of the Dead of the Twentieth Dynasty; it was simpler to write than the hieroglyphs in stone inscriptions, but it was not as cursive as hieratic and lacked the wide use of ligatures. Additionally, there was a variety of stone-cut hieratic, known as "lapidary hieratic". In the language's final stage of development, the Coptic alphabet replaced the older writing system.

Hieroglyphs are employed in two ways in Egyptian texts: as ideograms to represent the idea depicted by the pictures and, more commonly, as phonograms to represent their phonetic value.

As the phonetic realization of Egyptian currently is not known with certainty, Egyptologists use a system of transliteration to denote each sound that could be represented by a uniliteral hieroglyph.

Egyptian scholar Gamal Mokhtar noted that the inventory of hieroglyphic symbols derived from "fauna and flora used in the signs [which] are essentially African", reflecting the local wildlife of North Africa, the Levant and southern Mediterranean. In "regards to writing, we have seen that a purely Nilotic, hence [North] African origin not only is not excluded, but probably reflects the reality" that the geographical location of Egypt is, of course, in Africa.

== Morphology ==
Egyptian is fairly typical for an Afroasiatic language in that most of its vocabulary is built around roots of three consonants, though there are sometimes only two consonants in the root: rꜥ(w) ([riːʕa], "sun"—the [ʕ] is thought to have been something like a voiced pharyngeal fricative). Larger roots are also common and can have up to five consonants: sḫdḫd ("be upside-down").

Vowels and other consonants are added to the root to derive different meanings, as Arabic, Hebrew, and other Afroasiatic languages still do. However, because vowels and sometimes glides are not written in any Egyptian script except Coptic, reconstructing the actual forms of words can be difficult. Thus, orthographic stp ("to choose"), for example, can represent the stative (whose endings can be left unexpressed), the imperfective forms or even a verbal noun ("a choosing").

=== Nouns ===
Egyptian nouns can be masculine or feminine (the latter is indicated, as with other Afroasiatic languages, by adding a -t) and singular or plural (-w / -wt), or dual (-wj / -tj).

Articles, both definite and indefinite, do not occur until Late Egyptian but are used widely thereafter.

=== Pronouns ===
Egyptian has three different types of personal pronouns: suffix, enclitic (called "dependent" by Egyptologists) and independent pronouns. A number of verbal endings can also be added to the infinitive to form the stative and are regarded by some linguists as a "fourth" set of personal pronouns. They bear close resemblance to their Semitic counterparts. The three main sets of personal pronouns are as follows:

Personal pronouns
| | | | Suffix | Dependent | Independent |
|---|---|---|---|---|---|
| 1st person | singular | | .j or .ı͗ | wj or wı͗ | jnk or ı͗nk |
| 1st person | plural | | .n | n | jnn or ı͗nn |
| 2nd person | singular | masc. | .k | ṯw | ntk |
| 2nd person | singular | fem. | .ṯ | ṯn | ntṯ |
| 2nd person | plural | | .ṯn | ṯn | ntṯn |
| 3rd person | singular | masc. | .f | sw | ntf |
| 3rd person | singular | fem. | .s | sj | nts |
| 3rd person | plural | | .sn | sn | ntsn |

Demonstrative pronouns have separate masculine and feminine singular forms and common plural forms for both genders:

Demonstrative pronouns
| Singular | | Plural | Meaning |
| Masc. | Fem. | Plural | Meaning |
|---|---|---|---|
| pn | tn | nn | this, that, these, those |
| pf | tf | nf | that, those |
| pw | tw | nw | this, that, these, those (archaic) |
| pꜣ | tꜣ | nꜣ | this, that, these, those (colloquial [earlier] & Late Egyptian) |

Finally, interrogative pronouns bear a close resemblance to their Semitic and Berber counterparts:

Interrogative pronouns
| Pronoun | Meaning | Dependency |
|---|---|---|
| mj or mı͗ | who / what | Dependent |
| ptr | who / what | Independent |
| jḫ | what | Dependent |
| jšst or ı͗šst | what | Independent |
| zy | which | Independent & Dependent |

=== Verbs ===
Egyptian verbs have finite and non-finite forms.

Finite verbs convey person, tense/aspect, mood and voice. Each is indicated by a set of affixal morphemes attached to the verb: For example, the basic conjugation is sḏm ("to hear") is sḏm.f ("he hears").

Non-finite verbs occur without a subject and are the infinitive, the participles and the negative infinitive, which Egyptian Grammar: Being an Introduction to the Study of Hieroglyphs calls "negatival complement". There are two main tenses/aspects in Egyptian: past and temporally-unmarked imperfective and aorist forms. The latter are determined from their syntactic context.

=== Adjectives ===
Adjectives agree in gender and number with the nouns they modify:

z nfr
man good.MASC
"[the] good man"

zt nfrt
woman good.FEM
"[the] good woman"

Attributive adjectives in phrases are after the nouns they modify: nṯr ꜥꜣ ("[the] great god").

However, when they are used independently as a predicate in an adjectival phrase, as ꜥꜣ nṯr ("[the] god [is] great", lit. "great [is the] god"), adjectives precede the nouns they modify.

=== Prepositions ===
Egyptian makes use of prepositions.

| m | "in, as, with, from" |
| n | "to, for" |
| r | "to, at" |
| jn or ı͗n | "by" |
| ḥnꜥ | "with" |
| mj or mı͗ | "like" |
| ḥr | "on, upon" |
| ḥꜣ | "behind, around" |
| ẖr | "under" |
| tp | "atop" |
| ḏr | "since" |

=== Adverbs ===
Adverbs, in Egyptian, may appear at the end of a sentence. For example:

zı͗.n nṯr ı͗m
went god there
"[the] god went there"

Adverbs may also modify prepositions, in which case they precede the preposition they modify:

ḥrw r
apart regarding
"apart from"

Adverbs may also appear after adjectives to modify them:

ı͗qr wrt
excellent very
"very excellent"

Here are some common Egyptian adverbs:

| jm or ı͗m | "there" |
| ꜥꜣ | "here" |
| ṯnj or ṯnı͗ | "where" |
| zy-nw | "when" (lit. "which moment") |
| mj-jḫ or mı͗-ı͗ḫ | "how" (lit. "like-what") |
| r-mj or r-mı͗ | "why" (lit. "for what") |
| ḫnt | "before" |

== Syntax ==
Old Egyptian, Classical Egyptian, and Middle Egyptian have verb-subject-object as the basic word order. For example, the equivalent of "he opens the door" would be wn s ꜥꜣ ("opens he [the] door"). The so-called construct state combines two or more nouns to express the genitive, as in Semitic and Berber languages. However, that changed in the later stages of the language, including Late Egyptian, Demotic and Coptic.

The early stages of Egyptian have no articles, but the later forms use pꜣ, tꜣ and nꜣ.

As with other Afroasiatic languages, Egyptian uses two grammatical genders: masculine and feminine. It also uses three grammatical numbers: singular, dual and plural. However, later Egyptian has a tendency to lose the dual as a productive form.

== Legacy ==
The Egyptian language survived through the Middle Ages and into the early modern period in the form of the Coptic language. Coptic survived past the 16th century only as an isolated vernacular and as a liturgical language for the Coptic Orthodox and Coptic Catholic Churches. Coptic also had an enduring effect on Egyptian Arabic, which replaced Coptic as the main daily language in Egypt; the Coptic substratum in Egyptian Arabic appears in certain aspects of syntax and to a lesser degree in vocabulary and phonology.

In antiquity, Egyptian exerted some influence on Classical Greek, so that a number of Egyptian loanwords into Greek survive into modern usage. Examples include:

- ebony (Egyptian hbnj, via Greek and then Latin)
- ivory (Egyptian ꜣbw, via Latin)
- natron (Egyptian nṯrj, via Greek)
- lily (Egyptian ḥrrt, Coptic hlēri, via Greek)
- ibis (Egyptian hbj, via Greek)
- oasis (Egyptian wḥꜣt, via Greek)
- barge (Egyptian bꜣjr, via Greek))
- possibly cat (Note: Possibly the precursor of Coptic šau ("tomcat") suffixed with feminine -t, but some authorities dispute this, e.g. Huehnergard, John (2007). "Qiṭṭa: Arabic Cats". Classical Arabic Humanities in Their Own Terms. pp. 407–418. doi:10.1163/ej.9789004165731.i-612.89. ISBN 978-90-04-16573-1..)
- pharaoh (Egyptian pr ꜥꜣ, lit. "great house", via Hebrew and Greek)

The Hebrew Bible also contains some words, terms, and names that are thought by scholars to be Egyptian in origin. An example of this is Zaphnath-Paaneah, the Egyptian name given to Joseph.

The etymological root of "Egypt" is the same as Copts, ultimately from the Late Egyptian name of Memphis, Hikuptah, a continuation of Middle Egyptian ḥwt-kꜣ-ptḥ (lit. "temple of the ka (soul) of Ptah").

== See also ==
- Thesaurus Linguae Aegyptiae
- Ancient Egyptian literature
- Coptic language
- Egyptian Arabic
- Egyptian hieroglyphs
- Egyptian numerals
- Hieratic
- Transliteration of ancient Egyptian

== Bibliography ==
- Allen, James P. (2000). Middle Egyptian: An Introduction to the Language and Culture of Hieroglyphs. Cambridge University Press. ISBN 978-0-521-65312-1.
- Allen, James P. (2014). Middle Egyptian: An Introduction to the Language and Culture of Hieroglyphs, Third Edition. Cambridge University Press. ISBN 978-1-107-66328-2.
- Allen, James P. (2013). The Ancient Egyptian Language: An Historical Study. Cambridge University Press. ISBN 978-1-107-66467-8.
- Christidēs, Anastasios-Phoivos; Arapopoulou, Maria; Chritē, Maria (2007). A History of Ancient Greek: From the Beginnings to Late Antiquity. Cambridge University Press. ISBN 978-0-521-83307-3.
- Haspelmath, Martin (2001). Language Typology and Language Universals: An International Handbook. Walter de Gruyter. ISBN 3-11-017154-6.
- Bard, Kathryn A. (1999). Encyclopedia of the Archaeology of Ancient Egypt. Routledge. ISBN 0-415-18589-0.
- Callender, John B. (1975). Middle Egyptian. Undena Publications. ISBN 978-0-89003-006-6.
- Loprieno, Antonio (1995). Ancient Egyptian: A Linguistic Introduction. Cambridge: Cambridge University Press. ISBN 978-0-521-44384-5.
- Meyers, Eric M. (1997). The Oxford Encyclopedia of Archaeology in the Near East.
- Satzinger, Helmut (2008). "What happened to the voiced consonants of Egyptian?" (PDF). Vol. 2. Acts of the X International Congress of Egyptologists. pp. 1537–1546. Archived (PDF) from the original on 15 August 2014.
- Schenkel, Wolfgang (1990). Einführung in die altägyptische Sprachwissenschaft. Darmstadt: Wissenschaftliche Buchgesellschaft.
- Schenkel, Wolfgang (2012). Tübinger Einführung in die klassisch-ägyptische Sprache und Schrift, 7th rev. ed. Tübingen: Pagina.
- Vycichl, Werner (1983). Dictionnaire Étymologique de la Langue Copte. Leuven. ISBN 9782-7247-0096-1.
- Vycichl, Werner (1990). La Vocalisation de la Langue Égyptienne. Cairo: IFAO. ISBN 9782-7247-0096-1.
- Takács, Gábor (2011). "Semitic-Egyptian Relations". In Weninger, Stefan (ed.). The Semitic Languages: An International Handbook. de Gruyter Mouton.
- Allen, James P. (2020). Ancient Egyptian Phonology. Cambridge University Press. doi:10.1017/9781108751827. ISBN 978-1-108-48555-5. S2CID 216256704.
- Rubin, Aaron D. (1 August 2013). "Egyptian and Hebrew". In Khan, Geoffrey (ed.). Encyclopedia of Hebrew Language and Linguistics. Vol. 1. Leiden: Brill. p. 791. ISBN 978-90-04-17642-3. Archived from the original on 12 April 2023.
- Mattessich, Richard (2002). "The oldest writings, and inventory tags of Egypt". Accounting Historians Journal. 29 (1): 195–208. doi:10.2308/0148-4184.29.1.195. JSTOR 40698264. S2CID 160704269. Archived from the original on 31 December 2019.

== Literature ==
=== Overviews ===
- Allen, James P., The Ancient Egyptian Language: An Historical Study, Cambridge University Press, 2013. ISBN 978-1-107-03246-0 (hardback), ISBN 978-1-107-66467-8 (paperback).
- Loprieno, Antonio, Ancient Egyptian: A Linguistic Introduction, Cambridge University Press, 1995. ISBN 0-521-44384-9 (hardback), ISBN 0-521-44849-2 (paperback).
- Peust, Carsten (1999). Egyptian Phonology: An Introduction to the Phonology of a Dead Language. Peust & Gutschmidt. doi:10.11588/diglit.1167. ISBN 3-933043-02-6.
- Vergote, Jozef, "Problèmes de la «Nominalbildung» en égyptien", Chronique d'Égypte 51 (1976), pp. 261–285.
- Vycichl, Werner, La Vocalisation de la Langue Égyptienne, IFAO, Cairo, 1990. ISBN 9782-7247-0096-1.

=== Grammars ===
- Allen, James P., Middle Egyptian: An Introduction to the Language and Culture of Hieroglyphs, first edition, Cambridge University Press, 1999. ISBN 0-521-65312-6 (hardback) ISBN 0-521-77483-7 (paperback).
- Beylage, Peter, Middle Egyptian, Eisenbrauns, 2018. ISBN 978-1575069777
- Borghouts, Joris F., Egyptian: An Introduction to the Writing and Language of the Middle Kingdom, two vols., Peeters, 2010. ISBN 978-9-042-92294-5 (paperback).
- J. Cerny, S. Israelit-Groll, C. Eyre, A Late Egyptian Grammar, 4th, updated edition – Biblical Institute; Rome, 1984
- Collier, Mark, and Manley, Bill, How to Read Egyptian Hieroglyphs: A Step-by-Step Guide to Teach Yourself, British Museum Press (ISBN 0-7141-1910-5) and University of California Press (ISBN 0-520-21597-4), both 1998.
- Gardiner, Sir Alan H., Egyptian Grammar: Being an Introduction to the Study of Hieroglyphs, Griffith Institute, Oxford, 3rd ed. 1957. ISBN 0-900416-35-1.
- Hoch, James E., Middle Egyptian Grammar, Benben Publications, Mississauga, 1997. ISBN 0-920168-12-4.
- Junge, Friedrich, Late Egyptian Grammar: An Introduction, Griffith Institute, Oxford, 2005. ISBN 0-900416-858
- Selden, Daniel L., Hieroglyphic Egyptian: An Introduction to the Language and Literature of the Middle Kingdom, University of California Press, 2013. ISBN 978-0-520-27546-1 (hardback).

=== Dictionaries ===
- Erman, Adolf; Grapow, Hermann (1926–1961). Wörterbuch der ägyptischen Sprache [Dictionary of the Egyptian Language] (in German). Berlin: Akademie-Verlag. ISBN 978-3-05-002264-2.
- Faulkner, Raymond O., A Concise Dictionary of Middle Egyptian, Griffith Institute, Oxford, 1962. ISBN 0-900416-32-7 (hardback).
- Lesko, Leonard H., A Dictionary of Late Egyptian, 2nd ed., 2 vols., B. C. Scribe Publications, Providence, 2002 et 2004. ISBN 0-930548-14-0 (vol.1), ISBN 0-930548-15-9 (vol. 2).
- Shennum, David, English-Egyptian Index of Faulkner's Concise Dictionary of Middle Egyptian, Undena Publications, 1977. ISBN 0-89003-054-5.
- Bonnamy, Yvonne and Sadek, Ashraf-Alexandre, Dictionnaire des hiéroglyphes: Hiéroglyphes-Français, Actes Sud, Arles, 2010. ISBN 978-2-7427-8922-1.
- Vycichl, Werner, Dictionnaire Étymologique de la Langue Copte, Peeters, Leuven, 1984. ISBN 2-8017-0197-1.
- de Vartavan, Christian, Vocalised Dictionary of Ancient Egyptian (Open Access), Projectis Publishing, London, 2022. ISBN 978-1-913984-16-8. [Free PDF download: https://www.academia.edu/101048552/Vocalised_Dictionary_of_Ancient_Egyptian_Open_Access_]

=== Online dictionaries ===
- The Beinlich Wordlist, an online searchable dictionary of ancient Egyptian words (translations are in German).
- Thesaurus Linguae Aegyptiae, an online service available from October 2004 which is associated with various German Egyptological projects, including the monumental Altägyptisches Wörterbuch of the Berlin-Brandenburgische Akademie der Wissenschaften (Berlin-Brandenburg Academy of Sciences and Humanities, Berlin, Germany).
- Mark Vygus Dictionary 2018, a searchable dictionary of ancient Egyptian words, arranged by glyph.

Important Note: The old grammars and dictionaries of E. A. Wallis Budge have long been considered obsolete by Egyptologists, even though these books are still available for purchase.

More book information is available at Glyphs and Grammars.
