= Thesaurus Linguae Aegyptiae =

The Thesaurus Linguae Aegyptiae is an online dictionary and text corpus of the Egyptian language developed by the Research Centre for Primary Sources of the Ancient World at the Berlin-Brandenburg Academy of Sciences and Humanities (BBAW) in Berlin, Germany. Intended to be a complete documentation of the Egyptian lexicon, it encompasses varied meanings of words in different texts over 3000 years of linguistic history. The dictionary is entirely based on primary source material, including inscriptions from temple walls, roads, tombs, papyri, and potsherds from religious, legal, administrative, and literary texts. The Thesaurus Linguae Aegyptiae is publicly available on the internet. It is a publication of two academy's projects at the Berlin-Brandenburg Academy of Sciences and Humanities and the Saxon Academy of Sciences and Humanities.

== History ==
The Thesaurus Linguae Aegyptiae is modelled and built upon the Wörterbuch der aegyptischen Sprache (English: Dictionary of the Egyptian Language) begun by Adolf Erman in 1897 at the Prussian Academy of Sciences. His novel approach was to first create a comprehensive index of all primary source materials then available, rather than to start a dictionary on selected excerpts. This method built an Ancient Egyptian lexicography that is still important today. Between 1897–1940, with the participation of more than 80 domestic and foreign Egyptologists, the majority of known Egyptian texts was recorded and archived. The original Dictionary of the Egyptian Language (13 volumes, Leipzig-Berlin) appeared between 1926 and 1931, with revised editions until 1963. Other notable Egyptologists who contributed to the dictionary include Kurt Heinrich Sethe (1869–1934) and Hermann Grapow (1885–1967). At over 16,000 entries and over 1.5 million words, this monumental work remains the largest printed dictionary of Ancient Egyptian in existence.

By 1940 work on the Wörterbuch der aegyptischen Sprache was largely complete and work concentrated on research of the word files and indexes over the next 50 years. Since then, the amount of known texts discovered in pharaonic Egypt more than doubled and neither the dictionary nor the text files it was built upon represented the current state of research. The resumption of work on a new ancient Egyptian dictionary therefore became a priority among international Egyptologists. In 1993, a project to update the dictionary began at the Berlin-Brandenburg Academy of Sciences and Humanities and created the Thesaurus Linguae Aegyptiae.
