= Paul Erman =

German physicist

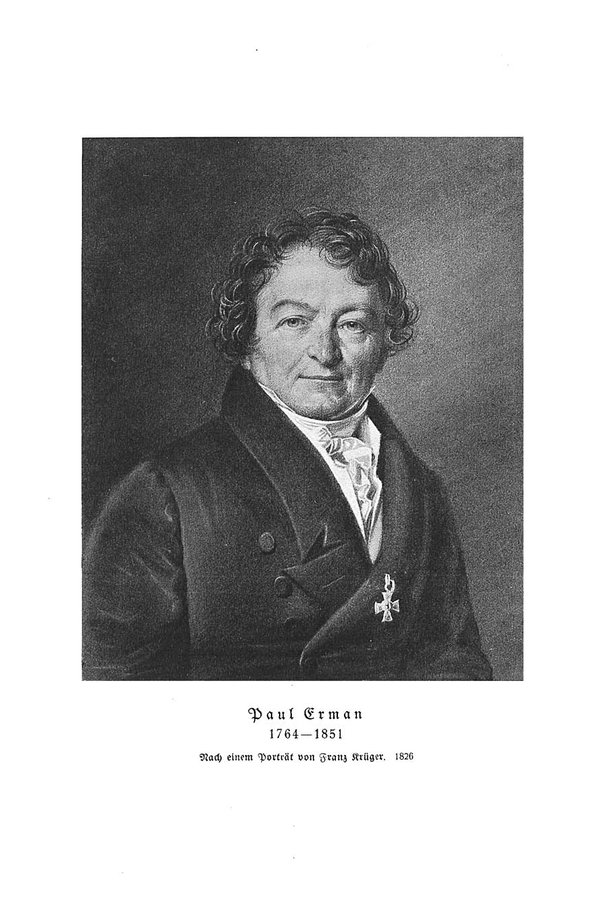
Paul Erman

Paul Erman (29 February 1764 – 11 October 1851) was a German physicist from Berlin, Brandenburg and a Huguenot of the fourth generation. His work was mainly concerned with electricity and magnetism, though he also made some contributions to optics and physiology.

According to Alexander von Humboldt, he was regarded by French scientists as the "first physicist of Germany." Max Planck considered him the first physicist to lecture on theory in Berlin.

== Life ==
He was the son of the historian Jean Pierre Erman (1735–1814), author of Histoire des réfugiés.

Erman became teacher of science successively at the French gymnasium (Französisches Gymnasium Berlin) in Berlin, and at the military academy, and on the foundation of the University of Berlin in 18 months he was chosen professor of physics.

Erman died in Berlin. He had a son, Georg Adolf Erman who was a physicist, and a grandson Johann Peter Adolf Erman, known as an Egyptologist.

== Work ==
Erman wrote a memoir in 1806 on the properties of materials to conduct electricity. He classified materials in 5 classes:

1. perfect conductors,
2. perfect non-conductors,
3. imperfect conductors,
4. positive conductors,
5. and negative conductors

Positive and negative conductors refers to bodies that cannot conduct electricity but can discharge a single positively- or negatively-charged electrode. Erman also studied the conduction of flames, for him hydrocarbon-based flames were positive conductors and sulfur flames were negative conductors. William Thomas Brande repeated the experiments in 1814, interpreting them under Humphry Davy's electrochemichal theory.

In 1807, Erman wrote two papers about unreproducibility of many of Johann Wilhelm Ritter's experiments and found flaws in many of his theories about electricity and matter. Erman conclusions were largely uncontested. As a respected physicist, Erman’s criticism is said to have contributed to a decline in interest in magnetochemistry for several years.

In 1808, he and Paul Ludwig Simon considered that sodium and potassium were not true metals but metal-like elements. They proposed the term metalloid instead (the term has caused confusion historically, see origin and use of the term metalloid).

== Awards ==
In 1806, Erman became the first and one of the four recipients of the Galvanism Prize awarded by Napoleon. Alongside he received 3000 French francs for his research.

He was elected member of the Fellow of the Royal Society of London in 1827.
