= Georg Adolf Erman =

German physicist (1806–1877)

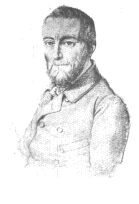
- Born: Berlin, Germany
- Children: Adolf Erman
- Relatives: Friedrich Bessel (father-in-law)

Georg Adolf Erman (12 May 1806 – 12 July 1877) was a German physicist.

Erman was born in Berlin as the son of Paul Erman. He studied natural science at the universities of Berlin and Königsberg, spent from 1828 to 1830 in a journey round the world, an account of which he published in Reise um die Erde durch Nordasien und die beiden Ozeane (1833–1848). The magnetic observations he made during his travels were utilized by Carl Friedrich Gauss in his theory of terrestrial magnetism. He was appointed professor of physics at Berlin in 1839, and died there in 1877.

From 1841 to 1865 he edited the Archiv für wissenschaftliche Kunde von Russland, and in 1874 he published, with H. J. R. Petersen, Die Grundlagen der Gauss'schen Theorie und die Erscheinungen des Erdmagnetismus im Jahre 1829.

Erman married, Marie Bessel, daughter of Friedrich Bessel, and they were the parents of Johann Peter Adolf Erman.
