= Wörterbuch der ägyptischen Sprache =

German-language dictionary of the Egyptian language

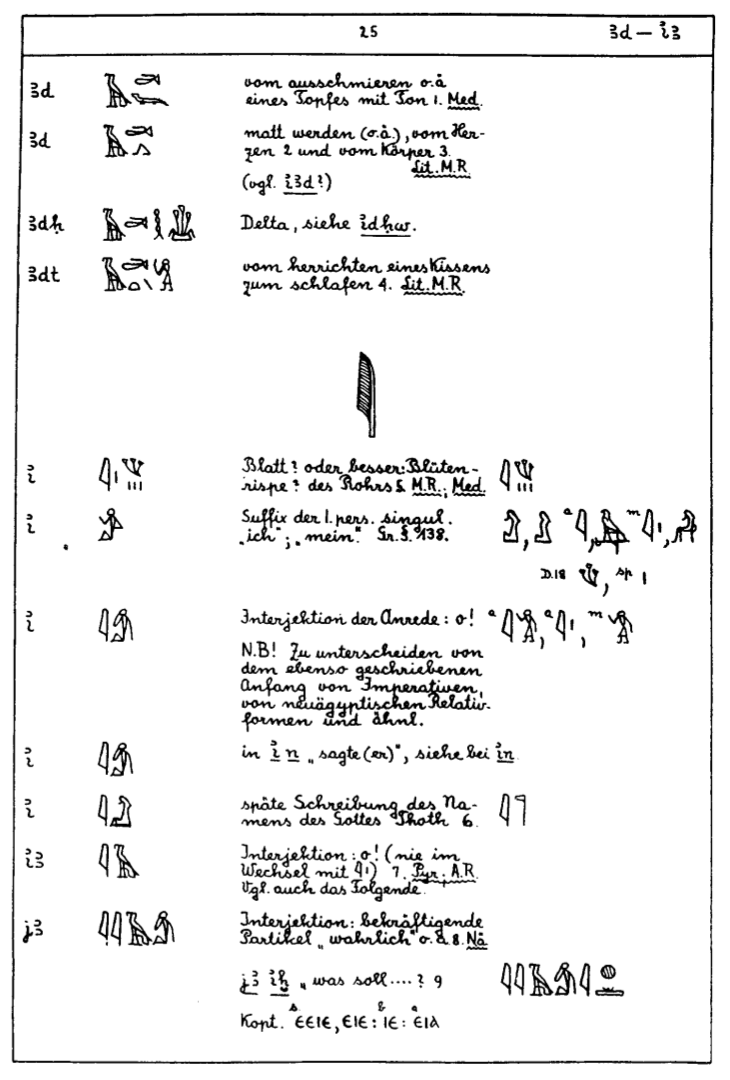
Sample page from the Wörterbuch, showing words beginning with hieroglyphs G1 (𓄿 Egyptian vulture, phonetic value alef, ꜣ) and M17 (𓇋 reed, phonetic value yod, ꞽ)

The Wörterbuch der aegyptischen Sprache (Dictionary of the Egyptian Language), abbreviated Wb. in bibliographic references, is a large German-language dictionary of the Egyptian language published between 1926 and 1961 by Adolf Erman and Hermann Grapow. It is a comprehensive work encompassing 3,000 years of linguistic history, including Old, Middle, and Late Egyptian as well as hieroglyphic inscriptions of the Classical Greco-Roman period. The dictionary contains approximately 16,000 headwords in five main volumes, two secondary volumes, and five volumes of primary source references. It is therefore the largest and most complete printed dictionary of Ancient Egyptian in existence.

The work began in 1897 as a research project at the Prussian Academy of Sciences in Berlin. The dictionary is also known as the "Berlin Dictionary". Interrupted by both World War I and World War II, the first volumes were published in 1926 and the final volume released in 1961. Today the dictionary forms the basis of the new Thesaurus Linguae Aegyptiae, a comprehensive update of the original and an online digitization project being conducted under the auspices of the Berlin-Brandenburg Academy of Sciences and Humanities since 1993.

== History ==
The project was launched in 1897 by Adolf Erman during the reign of Wilhelm II and supported with 120,000 Reichsmark. The project was undertaken at scientific Academies in Berlin, Göttingen, Leipzig and Munich elected by a Commission. Although cooperative international work was interrupted by World War I, the number of archived source texts had grown to 1,374,806 by 1918. Erman and Grapow published an intermediate result of the work as the "Egyptian Concise Dictionary" in 1921. In 1926 the five main volumes, financed by John Davison Rockefeller Jr. and autographed by the Danish Egyptologist Wolja Erichsen, were published.

== Literature ==
- Adolf Erman, Hermann Grapow (eds.): Wörterbuch der aegyptischen Sprache. 7 vols. Leipzig & Berlin 1926–1961.
- Adolf Erman, Hermann Grapow: Das Wörterbuch der ägyptischen Sprache. Zur Geschichte eines großen wissenschaftlichen Unternehmens der Akademie. Berlin 1953.
- Wolfgang Kosack: Wörterbuch der ägyptischen Sprache. Herausgegeben von Adolf Erman und Hermann Grapow. Erweitert, korrigiert und ergänzt von Wolfgang Kosack. 5 Bände, 5644 Seiten. Christoph Brunner, Nunningen 2018, ISBN 978-3-906206-40-0.
