= Hedwig Fechheimer =

German Egyptologist and art historian

Hedwig Jenny Fechheimer née Brühl also known as Hedwig Simon (1 June 1871 – 31 August 1942) was a German art historian and Egyptologist. She wrote two books on Egyptian sculpture Die Plastik der Aegypter (1914) and Kleinplastik der Ägypter (1921). She committed suicide in 1942 to avoid being sent to a concentration camp by the Nazi government.

== Early life and education ==
Brühl was born in Berlin to merchant Isidor and Bertha Brühl and grew up in Leipzig and trained to become a teacher in Breslau from 1892 to 1893. An older sister died young and a younger brother Ernst became a chemist. She joined the University of Berlin to study art history and philosophy, but only as a guest student and it was not until 1908 that women were allowed to graduate from universities. She is considered to belong to the so-called Berlin School of Egyptologists which included Adolf Erman. She was able to attend the lectures of Erman through the influence of her friend Emilie Cohen, the wife of Ludwig Borchardt, known for finding the Nefertiti Bust. The Berlin school chose to study Egyptian text and linguistics rather than to accumulate artefacts like the British and French Egyptologists. They produced the Wörterbuch der Altägyptische Sprache [Dictionary of Ancient Egyptian] and founded the Zeitschrift für Ägyptische Sprache und Altertumskunde [Journal of Egyptian Language and Archaeology] in 1863.

== Career ==
She wrote a few articles in Kunst und Künstler published by Bruno Cassirer. In her first book Die Plastik der Aegypter she examined cubism in Egyptian art. By 1923 it sold 26,000 copies. She was a friend of Carl Einstein but held contrarian views on Egyptian art. She argued against teleology in art history.

Fechheimer was a member of the commission on Egyptian artefacts at the Staatliche Museen zu Berlin and in this position she supported a return of the bust of Nefertiti to Egypt.

== Personal life ==
She married Sigfried Fechheimer on November 17, 1903, but he died from tuberculosis just the next year, and then she married Richard Simon in 1917. After the death of Simon, around 1920, she lived with her sister Margot (Margarete). After the rise of Nazi power she was persecuted as a Jew. In 1941, she and her sister were forced to vacate their home in Berlin-Wilmersdorf. They then lived for some time at Heilbronner Street and when deportation to a concentration camp became inescapable, she and her sister committed suicide on August 31, 1942. She was 71 at the time of her death.

== Legacy ==
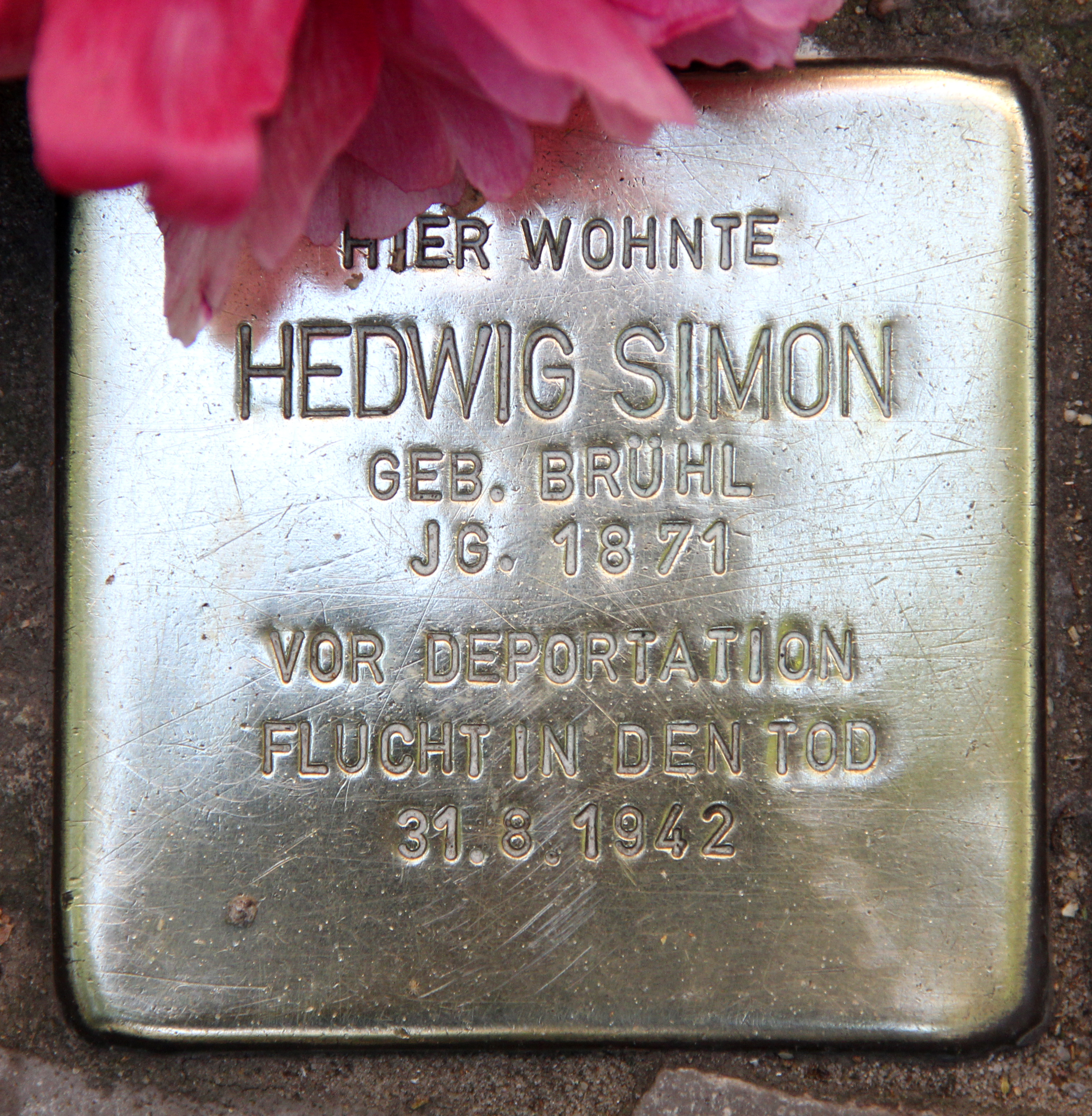
Stolperstein memorial

A Stolperstein now stands before their home at Helmstedter Strasse and a plaque marks the home since 2015.
