= Origin and use of the term metalloid =

Etymology of a term

The origin and usage of the term metalloid is convoluted. Its origin lies in attempts, dating from antiquity, to describe metals and to distinguish between typical and less typical forms. It was first applied to metals that floated on water (lithium, sodium and potassium), and then more popularly to nonmetals. Only recently, since the mid-20th century, has it been widely used to refer to elements with intermediate or borderline properties between metals and nonmetals.

== Pre-1800 ==
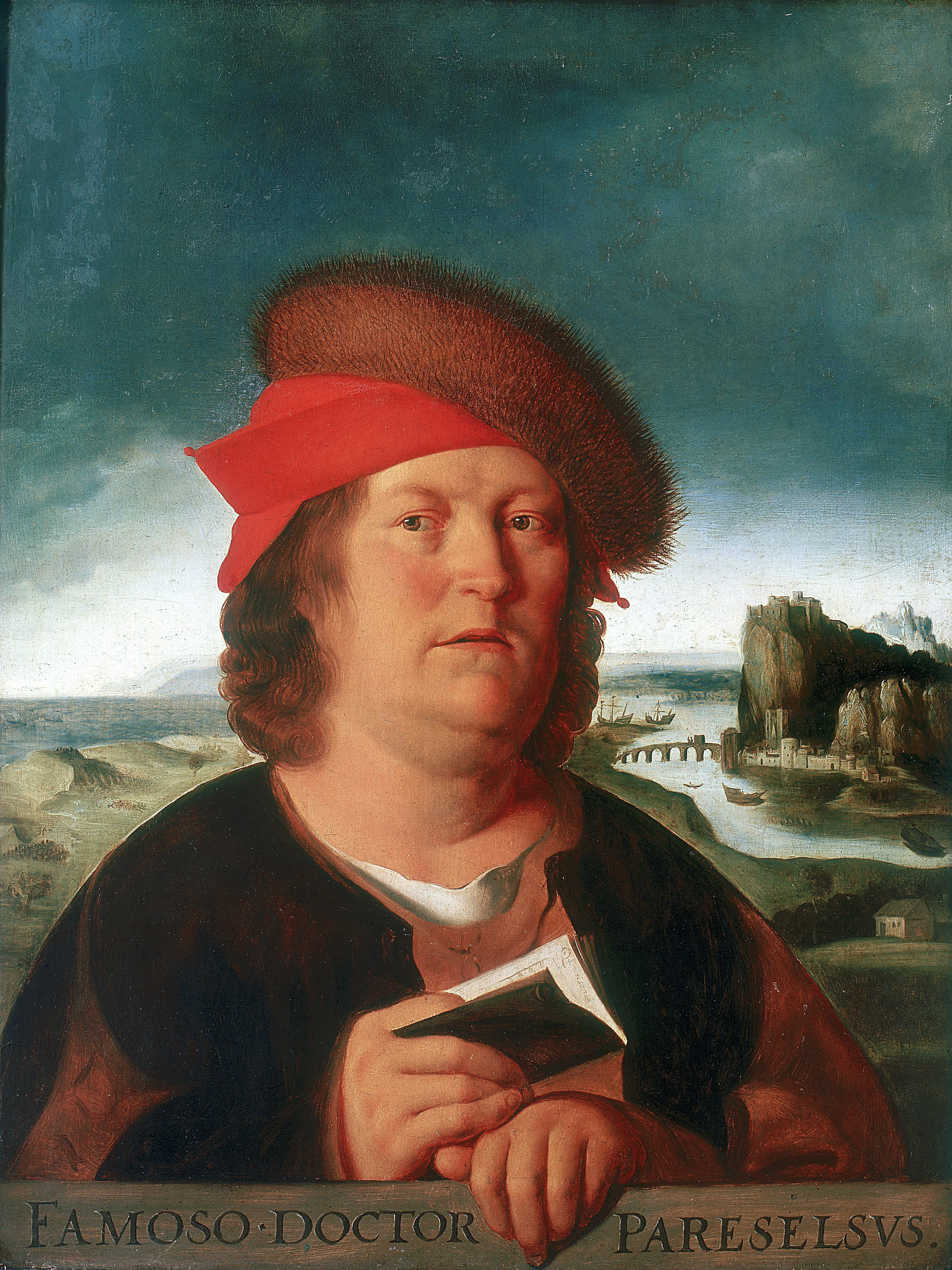
Paracelsus (1493–1541), German-Swiss physician, iatrochemist, philosopher, astrologer and commentator as to the nature and properties of metals. He referred to zinc and bismuth as 'bastard' copper, and 'bastard' tin, respectively. Portrait by Quentin Massys

Ancient conceptions of metals as solid, fusible and malleable substances can be found in Plato's Timaeus (c. 360 BCE) and Aristotle's Meteorology.

More sophisticated classification arrangements were proposed by Pseudo-Geber (in the Geber corpus, c. 1310), Paracelsus (De Natura Rerum libri nonem, 1525–6; and later works), Basil Valentine (Conclusiones, 1624), and Boerhaave (Elementa Chemiæ, 1733). They attempted to separate the more characteristic metals from substances having those characteristics to a lesser degree. Such substances included zinc, antimony, bismuth, stibnite, pyrite and galena. These were all then called semimetals or bastard metals.

In 1735, Brandt proposed to make the presence or absence of malleability the principle of this classification. On that basis he separated mercury from the metals. The same view was adopted by Vogel (1755, Institutiones Chemiæ) and Buffon (1785, Histoire Naturelle des Minéraux). In the interim, Braun had observed the solidification of mercury by cold in 1759–60. This was confirmed by Hutchins and Cavendish in 1783. The malleability of mercury then became known, and it was included amongst the metals.

In 1789, Fourcroy highlighted the weakness of this distinction between metals and semimetals. He said it was evident from the fact that

between the extreme malleability of gold and the singular fragility of arsenic, other metals presented only imperceptible gradations of this character, and because there was probably no greater difference between the malleability of gold and that of lead, which was considered to be a metal, than there was between lead and zinc, which was classed among semi-metals, while in the substances intermediate between zinc and arsenic the differences were slight.

This idea of a semimetal, as a brittle (and thereby imperfect) metal, was gradually discarded after 1789 with the publication of Lavoisier's 'revolutionary' Elementary Treatise on Chemistry. (Note: In its first seventeen years, Lavoisier's work was republished in twenty-three editions and six languages, and carried his 'new chemistry' across Europe and America.)

== 1800–1959 ==
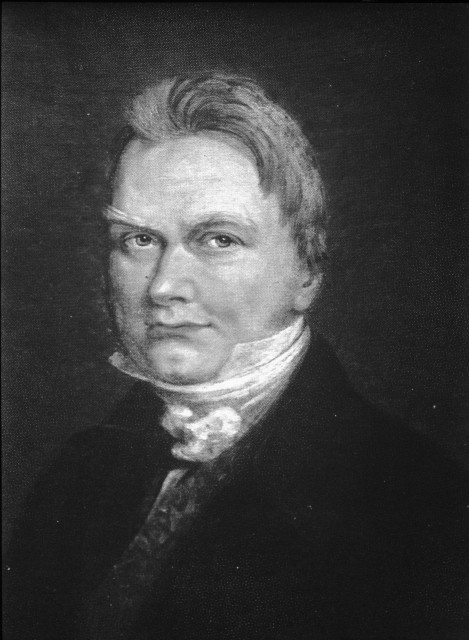
Jöns Jacob Berzelius (1779–1848), Swedish chemist who popularized the use of the word metalloid to refer to nonmetallic chemical elements

In 1808, Erman and Simon suggested using the term metalloid to refer to the newly discovered elements sodium and potassium. These elements were lighter than water and many chemists did not regard them as proper metals. Erman and Simon's proposal may have been made '[in] an attempt to revive this old distinction between metals and substances resembling metals'. Their suggestion was ignored by the chemical community.

In 1811, Berzelius referred to nonmetallic elements as metalloids, in reference to their ability to form oxyanions. A common oxyanion of sulfur, for example, is the sulfate ion SO^{2−}_{4}. Many metals can do the same. Chromium, for instance, can form the chromate ion CrO^{2−}_{4}. Berzelius' terminology was widely adopted although it was subsequently regarded by some commentators as counterintuitive, misapplied, incorrect or invalid. In 1825, in a revised German edition of his Textbook of Chemistry, Berzelius subdivided the metalloids into three classes. These were: constantly gaseous 'gazolyta' (hydrogen, nitrogen, oxygen); real metalloids (sulfur, phosphorus, carbon, boron, silicon); and salt-forming 'halogenia' (fluorine, chlorine, bromine, iodine).

In 1844, Jackson gave the meaning of 'metalloid' as 'like metals, but wanting some of their properties.' In 1845, in A dictionary of science, literature and art, Berzelius' classification of the elementary bodies was represented as: I. gazolytes; II. halogens; III. metalloids ('resemble the metals in certain aspects, but are in others widely different'); and IV. metals.

In 1864, calling nonmetals 'metalloids' was still sanctioned 'by the best authorities' even though this did not always seem appropriate. The greater propriety of applying the word metalloid to other elements, such as arsenic, had been considered.

By as early as 1866, some authors were instead using the term nonmetal, rather than metalloid, to refer to nonmetallic elements. In 1875, Kemshead observed that the elements had been subdivided into two classes—'non-metals or metalloids, and metals.' He added that '[t]he former term, although not so convenient, because a compound word, is more correct, and is now universally employed.'

In 1876, Tilden protested against, 'the [still] too common though illogical practice of giving the name metalloid to such bodies as oxygen, chlorine or fluorine'. He instead divided the elements into ('basigenic') true metals, metalloids ('imperfect metals') and ('oxigenic') nonmetals.

As late as 1888, classifying the elements into metals, metalloids, and nonmetals, rather than metals and metalloids, was still regarded as peculiar and potentially confusing.

Beach, writing in 1911, explained it this way:

Metalloid (Gr. "metal-like"), in chemistry, any nonmetallic element. There are 13, namely, sulfur, phosphorus, fluorin[e], chlorin[e], iodine, bromine, silicon, boron, carbon, nitrogen, hydrogen, oxygen, and selenium. The distinction between the metalloids and the metals is slight. The former, excepting selenium and phosphorus, do not have a "metallic" lustre; they are poorer conductors of heat and electricity, are generally not reflectors of light and not electropositive; that is, no metalloid fails of all these tests. The term seems to have been introduced into modern usage instead of nonmetals for the very reason that there is no hard and fast line between metals and nonmetals, so that "metal-like" or "resembling metals" is a better description of the class than the purely negative "nonmetals". Originally it was applied to the nonmetals which are solid at ordinary temperature.

In or around 1917, the Missouri Board of Pharmacy wrote that:

A metal may be said to differ from a metalloid [that is, a nonmetal] in being an excellent conductor of heat and electricity, in reflecting light more or less powerfully and in being electropositive. A metalloid may possess one or more of these characters, but not all of them ... Iodine is most commonly given as an example of a metalloid because of its metallic appearance.

We may notice that the distinction between metals and non-metals is not a sharply defined one—the one class shades off into the other. In the case of copper and carbon the balance of evidence is clear enough, but in some cases (e.g. arsenic) there is just about as much to be said on one side as on the other, and it is impossible to decided whether the element is a metal or non-metal. Such elements are often called metalloids.

— Littler W 1935, Elementary Chemistry, G Bell and Sons, London, p. 337

During the 1920s, the two meanings of the word metalloid appeared to be undergoing a transition in popularity. Writing in A Dictionary of Chemical Terms, Couch defined 'metalloid' as an old, obsolescent term for 'nonmetal.' (Note: Couch also commented that there was, 'no sharp line of demarcation between metals and nonmetals as many of the latter class possess some metallic properties' [italics added].) In contrast, Webster's New International Dictionary noted that use of the term metalloid to refer to nonmetals was the norm. Its application to elements resembling the typical metals in some way only, such as arsenic, antimony and tellurium, was recorded merely on a 'sometimes' basis.

Use of the term metalloid subsequently underwent a period of great flux up to 1940. Consensus as to its application to intermediate or borderline elements did not occur until the ensuing years, between 1940 and 1960.

In 1947, Pauling included a reference to metalloids in his classic and influential textbook, General chemistry: An introduction to descriptive chemistry and modern chemical theory. He described them as 'elements with intermediate properties ... occupy[ing] a diagonal region [on the periodic table], which includes boron, silicon, germanium, arsenic, antimony, tellurium, and polonium.'

In 1959 the International Union of Pure and Applied Chemistry (IUPAC) recommended that '[t]he word metalloid should not be used to denote nonmetals' although it was still being used in this sense (around that time) by, for example, the French.

== 1960–present ==
In 1969, the classic and authoritative Hackh's Chemical Dictionary included entries for both 'metalloid' and 'semimetal'. The latter term was described as obsolete.

In 1970, IUPAC recommended abandoning the term metalloid because of its continuing inconsistent use in different languages. They suggested using the terms metal, semimetal and nonmetal instead. Despite this recommendation, use of the term 'metalloid' increased dramatically. Google Ngram Viewer showed a fourfold increase in the use of the word 'metalloid' (as compared to 'semimetal') in the American English corpus from 1972 to 1983. There was a sixfold increase in the British English corpus from 1976 to 1983. As at 2011, the difference in usage across the English corpus was around 4:1 in favour of 'metalloid'.

The most recent IUPAC publications on chemical nomenclature (the "Red Book", 2005) and terminology (the "Gold Book", 2006–) do not include any recommendations as to the usage or non-usage of the terms metalloid or semimetal. (Note: The "Gold Book" contains one reference to semimetals in the physics-based sense (see 'semiconductor-metal transition') and one reference in the chemistry based sense (see 'organometallic compounds'). The latter entry notes that 'traditional metals and semi-metals' can form such compounds, as can 'boron, silicon, arsenic and selenium'.)

Use of the term semimetal when discussing the periodic table, rather than metalloid, has recently been discouraged. This is because the former term 'has a well defined and quite distinct meaning' in band structure, where a semimetal is an element or a compound where the highest occupied and lowest unoccupied bands overlap in terms of energy, but have different momenta. This often results in only a small number of charge carriers, for instance the densities in the elemental semimetals carbon (as graphite, in the direction of its planes), arsenic, antimony and bismuth are 3×10^{18} cm^{−3}, 2 ×10^{20} cm^{−3}, 5×10^{19} cm^{−3} and 3×10^{17} cm^{−3} respectively. In contrast, the room-temperature concentration of charge carriers in metals usually exceeds 10^{22} cm^{−3}.

References to 'metalloid' as being outdated have also been described as 'nonsense' noting that 'it accurately describes these weird in-between elements'.
