= Werner Vycichl =

Austro-Hungarian philologist (1909–1999)

Werner Vycichl (Prague, Bohemia, 20 January 1909 – Geneva, Switzerland, 23 September 1999) was an Austro-Hungarian philologist, linguist, and scholar in Berberology, Coptology, and Egyptology, as well as in the areas of Ancient Egyptian, Berber, and Hamito-Semitic (Afroasiatic) comparative linguistics.

Born in Prague, Bohemia (in the present-day Czech Republic), he began his studies in 1928 with the Institute for Egyptology and Africanistic at the University of Vienna, completing his dissertation on a Hausa Dialect in 1932.

From 1934 to 1938 he carried out fieldwork in Zeniya, Egypt where he studied and recorded the pronunciation of Coptic by Copts in the area near Luxor, later collaborating with William Worrel in the production of "Popular Traditions of the Coptic Language" in 1934.

From 1948, he resided in Paris. In 1960, he settled with his family in Geneva, Switzerland, where, from 1973 to 1980, he was titular professor of Egyptology and Hamito-Semitic (Afroasiatic) Languages at the University of Fribourg. After publishing numerous scholarly articles in the various topics of his expertise, in 1978 Vycichl was instrumental in the founding of the Société Égyptologique de Genève.

He published his magnum opus the Dictionnaire Étymologique de la Langue Copte in 1983. This was followed by a work dedicated specifically to the topic of the vocalization of Ancient Egyptian, La vocalisation de la langue égyptienne. Vycichl was honored in 2004 with a volume published in his memory, edited by Gábor Takács. Here, the editor referred to him as the "last great representative of the old generation of Egypto-Semitic and Afro-Asiatic (Semito-Hamitic) comparative linguists".

== Works ==
- Vycichl, Werner (1983). Dictionnaire étymologique de la langue copte. Leuven: Peeters. ISBN 978-2-8017-0197-3.
- Vycichl, Werner (1990). La vocalisation de la langue égyptienne. Bibliothèque d'Étude. Vol. 16. Cairo: Institut français d'archéologie orientale.
