= Adolf Erman =

German Egyptologist and lexicographer (1854–1937)

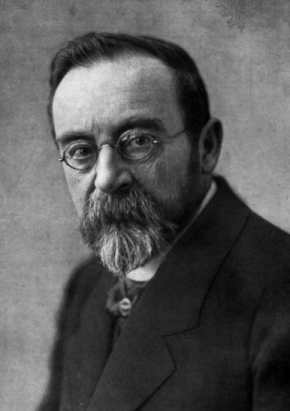
- Born: October 31, 1854; Berlin, Germany
- Died: June 26, 1937 (aged 82); Berlin, Germany
- Father: Georg Adolf Erman
- Relatives: Paul Erman (grandfather); Friedrich Bessel (grandfather)
- Scientific career
- Fields: Egyptology
- Institutions: Humboldt University of Berlin
- Notable students: Hermann Grapow; James Henry Breasted; Hedwig Fechheimer

Johann Peter Adolf Erman (German: [ɛɐ̯ˈmãː]; 31 October 1854 – 26 June 1937) was a German Egyptologist and lexicographer.

== Education ==
Born in Berlin, he was the son of the physicist Georg Adolf Erman and grandson of the physicist Paul Erman and the astronomer Friedrich Wilhelm Bessel.

Educated at Leipzig and Berlin, he became associate professor of Egyptology at the University of Berlin in 1883 and full professor in 1892. In 1885 he was appointed director of the Egyptian department at the royal museum. In 1934 he was excluded from the faculty of the university because he was, according to the Nazi ideology, one quarter Jewish. As his family had converted to Protestantism in 1902, he and his family were not persecuted by the Nazi Party, but they all lost their positions.

== Career ==
Erman and his school at Berlin had the difficult task of recovering the grammar of the Egyptian language and spent thirty years of special study on it. The greater part of Egyptian texts after the Middle Kingdom having been written in what was even then practically a dead language, as dead as Latin was to the medieval monks in Italy who wrote and spoke it, Erman selected for special investigation those texts which really represented the growth of the language at different periods, and, as he passed from one epoch to another, compared and consolidated his results.

The Neuägyptische Grammatik (1880) dealt with texts written in the vulgar dialect of the New Kingdom (Dyns. XVIII to XX). Next followed, in the Zeitschrift für ägyptische Sprache und Alterthumskunde, studies on the Old Kingdom inscription of Unas, and the Middle Kingdom contracts of Assiut, as well as on an Old Coptic text of the 3rd century CE. At this point a papyrus of stories written in the popular language of the Middle Kingdom provided Erman with a stepping-stone from Old Egyptian to the Late Egyptian of the Neuägyptische Grammatik, and gave the connections that would bind solidly together the whole structure of Egyptian grammar (see Sprache des Papyrus Westcar, 1889). The very archaic Pyramid Texts enabled him to sketch the grammar of the earliest known form of Egyptian (Zeitschrift d. Deutsch. Morgenl. Gesellschaft, 1892), and in 1894 he was able to write a little manual of Egyptian for beginners (Ägyptische Grammatik, 4th ed., 1928), centering on the language of the standard inscriptions of the Middle and New Kingdoms, but accompanying the main sketch with references to earlier and later forms.

=== Pupils ===
Erman's pupils include James Henry Breasted, America's first Professor of Egyptology with his numerous works including his History of Egypt from the Earliest Times Down to the Persian Conquest (1905) and Georg Steindorff's little Koptische Grammatik (1894, ed. 1904), improving greatly on Stern's standard work in regard to phonology and the relationship of Coptic forms to Egyptian, and Sethe's Das Ägyptische Verbum (1899). The latter is an extensive monograph on the verb in Egyptian and Coptic by a brilliant and laborious philologist. Owing to the very imperfect notation of sound in the writing, the highly important subject of the verbal roots and verbal forms was perhaps the obscurest branch of Egyptian grammar when Sethe first attacked it in 1895. The subject has been reviewed by Erman, Die Flexion des Aegyptischen Verbums in the Sitzungsberichte of the Berlin Academy, 1900. The Berlin school, having settled the main lines of the grammar, next turned its attention to lexicography. It devised a scheme, founded on that for the Latin Thesaurus of the Berlin Academy, which almost mechanically sorts the whole number of occurrences of every word in any text examined. In 1897, Erman, working together with Sethe, Hermann Grapow and other coworkers from all over the world, started to catalogue all the words from all the known Egyptian texts available; the result was an ensemble of about 1,500,000 datasheets that form the basis for the masterpiece of the ancient Egyptian lexicography, the famous Wörterbuch der ägyptischen Sprache, whose first five volumes were published between 1926 and 1931. The complete edition of this gigantic dictionary comprises a total of twelve volumes.

== Death and legacy ==
Erman said that the so-called pseudo-participle(also known as old perfective or stative) had been, in meaning and in form, a rough analogue of the Semitic perfect, though the original employment of the pseudo-participle was almost obsolete in the time of the earliest known texts. Erman died in Berlin.

== Works ==
- Life in Ancient Egypt, translated by H. M. Tirard (London, 1894; online version at the Internet Archive) (the original Aegypten und aegyptisches Leben im Altertum, 2 vols., was published in 1885/1887 at Tübingen)
- Neuägyptische Grammatik. 1880
- Sprache des Papyrus Westcar. 1889
- Zeitschrift der Deutschen Morgenländischen Gesellschaft. 1892
- Egyptian grammar : with table of signs, bibliography, exercises for reading and glossar, 1894 (online version at the Internet Archive)
- Ägyptische Grammatik, 2nd ed.. 1902
- Die Flexion des ägyptischen Verbums in the Sitzungsberichte
- Die aegyptische Religion. Berlin 1905; Translated by A. S. Griffith: A Handbook of Egyptian Religion with 130 illustrations. Published in the original German edition as a handbook, by the General Verwaltung of the Berlin Imperial Museums.
- Das Verhältnis der ägyptischen zu den semitischen Sprachen (Zeitschrift der deutschen morgenländischen Gesellschaft, 1892); Zimmern, Vergi. Gram., 1898;
- Flexion des Aegyptischen Verbums (Sitzungsberichte d. Ben. Akad., 1900).
- Die Literatur der Aegypter, 1923. English translation by Aylward M. Blackman published as The Literature of the Ancient Egyptians, London, Methuen & Co., 1927; reprinted as The Ancient Egyptians: A Sourcebook of their Writings, introduction to the Torchbook edition by William Kelly Simpson, New York, Harper & Row, 1966.

== See also ==
- List of Egyptologists
- Michael Ventris
