= Berlin-Brandenburg Academy of Sciences and Humanities =

German academic society

Berlin-Brandenburgische Akademie der Wissenschaften
- Abbreviation: BBAW
- Formation: 1700 (founded); 1752 (Royal Society); 1918 (Prussian Academy); 1992 (modern charter)
- Legal status: independent, corporation under public law
- Headquarters: Jägerstrasse 22/23; D-10117 Berlin, Germany
- Coordinates: 52°30′50″N 13°23′39″E
- Official language: German
- President: Christoph Markschies
- Vice-Presidents: Julia Fischer; Ulrike Kuhlmann
- Main organ: Board of Directors
- Staff: 450
- Website: www.bbaw.de/en

The Berlin-Brandenburg Academy of Sciences and Humanities (German: Berlin-Brandenburgische Akademie der Wissenschaften), abbreviated BBAW, is the official academic society for the natural sciences and humanities for the German states of Berlin and Brandenburg. Housed in three locations in and around Berlin, Germany, the BBAW is the largest non-university humanities research institute in the region.

The BBAW was constituted in 1992 by formal treaty between the governments of Berlin and Brandenburg on the basis of several older academies, including the historic Prussian Academy of Sciences from 1700 and East Germany's Academy of Sciences of the German Democratic Republic from 1946. By this tradition, past members include the Brothers Grimm, Wilhelm and Alexander von Humboldt, Lise Meitner, Theodor Mommsen, Albert Einstein, and Max Planck.

Today the BBAW operates as a public law corporation (German: Körperschaft des öffentlichen Rechts) in cooperation with the German National Academy of Sciences, and has over 300 fellows and 250 additional staff members. Its elected scientific membership has included 78 Nobel laureates.

The BBAW operates several subsidiary research centers. Projects include compiling large dictionaries; editing texts from ancient, medieval, and modern history; and editing the classical literature from diverse fields. Notable examples include Inscriptiones Graecae, the Corpus Inscriptionum Latinarum, the German Dictionary (German: Deutsches Wörterbuch), the Ancient Egyptian Dictionary (Altägyptisches Wörterbuch), the bibliography of works by Alexander von Humboldt, and a scholarly edition of the works of Ludwig Feuerbach.

== History ==
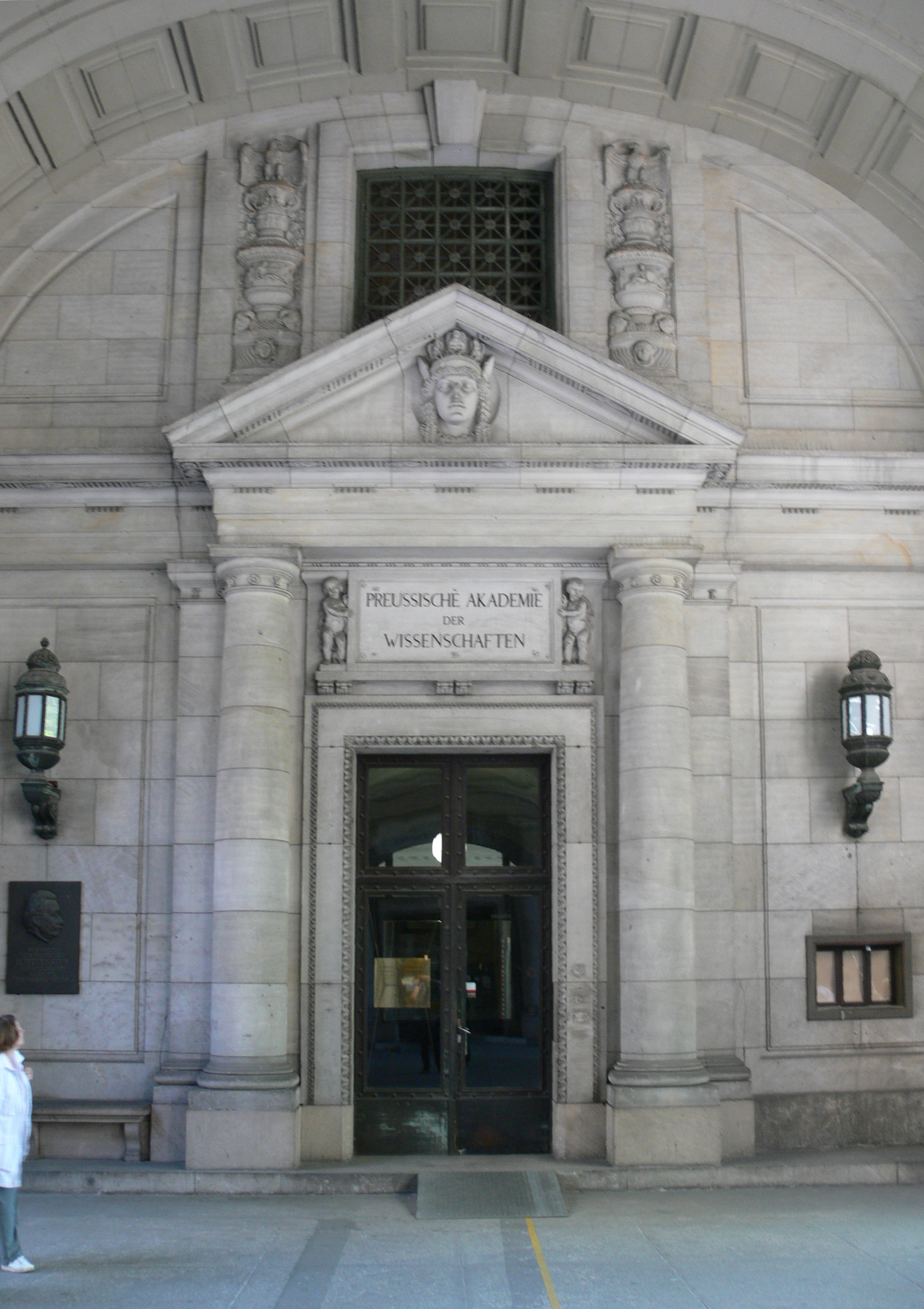
Entrance to the old Prussian Academy of Sciences at the Berlin State Library located Unter den Linden 8. Today the building hosts historical projects of the BBAW and its library.

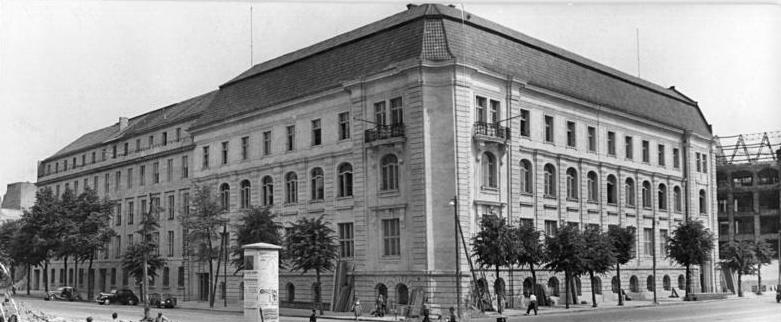
The German Academy of Sciences at Berlin or DAW (1950), later Academy of Sciences of the GDR or ADW.

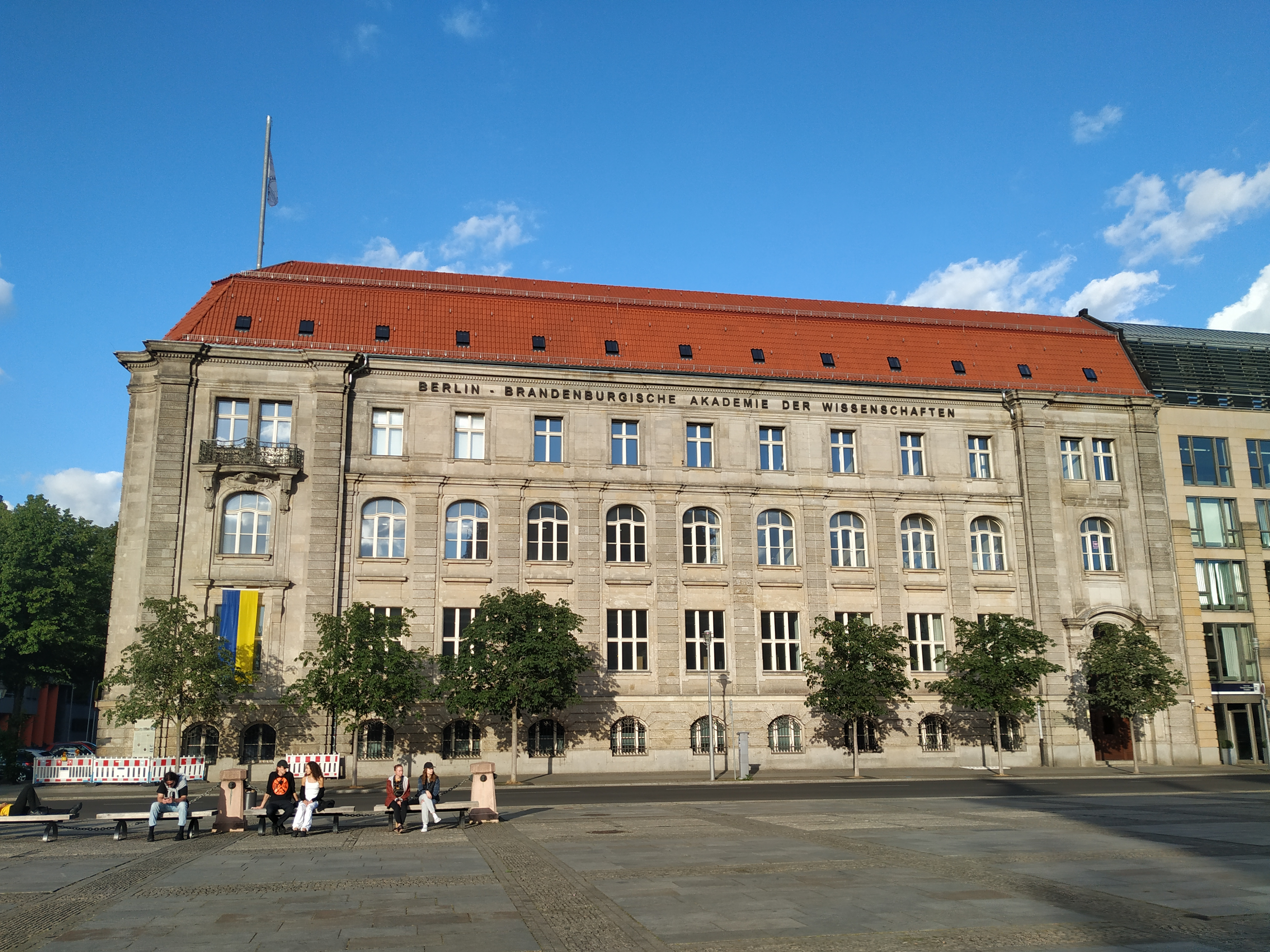
The modern BBAW headquarters in the historic building of the AdW at Gendarmenmarkt in Berlin-Mitte (2022)

=== Society of Sciences (1700–52) ===
The roots of the BBAW can be traced to the Society of Sciences of the Elector of Brandenburg (German: Kurfürstlich Brandenburgische Sozietät der Wissenschaften), founded in 1700 by Gottfried Wilhelm Leibniz under the patronage of Frederick I of Prussia. The institution was created on the principle of uniting the natural sciences and the humanities, making it a prototype for other academies across Europe. The rise of the field of physics can be genealogically traced to this period of the Academy, as well as modern European mathematics.

=== Royal Academy (1752–1812) ===
Under Frederick the Great, an enthusiastic patron, the Academy rose to even wider significance. In 1752 it merged with the Nouvelle Société Littéraire to form the Royal Academy of Sciences (German: Königliche Akademie der Wissenschaften). The new Academy attracted prominent scientists and philosophers, including Immanuel Kant, who were able publish writings which would have been censored elsewhere in Europe. While it was an important center in the Age of Enlightenment, due to its royal patronage the Academy did not enjoy complete freedom. Political writings in its Proceedings throughout the 18th century argued the merits of monarchies over republics, warned against the French Revolution, and defended Prussia against accusations that it was despotic.

=== Royal Prussian Academy (1812-1918) ===
Around 1812 the academy was officially renamed Royal Prussian Academy of Sciences. The von Humboldt brothers reorganized the Academy along more open lines. Prominent critical thinkers such as Theodor Mommsen, Friedrich Wilhelm Joseph Schelling, Friedrich Schleiermacher were all active members for many decades.

=== Prussian Academy (1918–33) ===
With the collapse of the German monarchy in 1918, the Royal Academy was renamed the Prussian Academy of Sciences (German: Preußische Akademie der Wissenschaften). During this period it rose to international fame and its members included top academics in their fields such as Albert Einstein, Max Planck, Hermann Diels, and Ernst Bloch.

=== Nazi Germany (1933–45) ===
During the Nazi period, as with all institutions across Germany, the Academy became subject to the "Law for the Restoration of the Professional Civil Service." As a result, Jewish employees and political opponents were expelled. Albert Einstein resigned in 1933 before he could be expelled and Max Planck, the Academy's president, was coerced to publicly support nationalist socialism. However, despite initial resistance, over time the Academy and many of its scientists became willing tools of the Nazis. New statutes in 1938 reorganized the Academy according to the Führer principle, causing Planck to resign his presidency in protest. The mathematician Theodor Vahlen, proponent of the anti-Semitic Deutsche Mathematik movement, was appointed provisionally president by the Reich Ministry of Education. In 1939 Vahlen was reconfirmed by the Ministry as acting President, but not elected by the Plenum of the Academy. Vahlen resigned in 1943 and withdrew to Prague. A presidential election in accordance with the statutes had still not taken place by the end of the war. By war's end the Academy's reputation was damaged and many of its prominent scientists were stigmatized. Planck died in 1947.

=== End of war and new beginning (1945) ===
During the war academy members had still continued their monthly meetings despite bombing of Berlin. However, many members, especially those of the natural sciences, had left Berlin and moved to the western parts of Germany. The remaining 16 members met in June 1945, elected a new president, talked about a new statute, performed denazification by excluding members tightly connected to the old regime, and started negotiations with the Berlin Magistrat, the Soviet Military Administration in Germany (SMAD) and the SMAD's German counterpart DZVV (Deutsche Zentralverwaltung für Volksbildung), which was responsible for the eastern part of Berlin (belonging to the Soviet Zone of Occupation), where the building of the PAW was located.

=== Modern history (1946–present) ===
Negotiations of the Academy with the SMAD were successful. It was re-established upon the SMAD Order No. 187 of July 1, 1946, Leibniz's 300th birthday under a new name with a new structure and role: the Academy was to become the most eminent scientific institution in Germany and for all parts of Germany. Institutes were added to the Academy and new ones founded. Re-opened by the Russians in 1946 with the new name German Academy of Sciences at Berlin (German: Deutsche Akademie der Wissenschaften zu Berlin), in 1949 it moved to the former Prussian Maritime Trade Company building on the Gendarmenmarkt. The number of members in additional more applied classes was increased from 70 to 120 and the number of staff members from 130 (1946) to 1,500 (1951).

In 1972 the Academy was renamed the Academy of Sciences of the German Democratic Republic (German: Akademie der Wissenschaften der DDR) or AdW, by which time it had over 400 members and 24,000 employees. The society of scholars with about 130 ordinary members and the research institutes existed side by side. The about 93 institutes of the academy were merged into 43 central and other institutes. 1969 the function "as a bridge to West-Germany" was ended and all members not being citizens of the GDR became non-voting external members.

After German reunification the AdW was dissolved in December 1991 as part of the German Unification Treaty of October 3, 1991 due to its controversial role in support of the East German regime.

In August 1992, the BBAW was constituted by an interstate treaty between the landtags of Berlin and Brandenburg using the original model of the old Prussian Academy. According to the treaty the society of the members of the AdW was separated from the rest of the academy. Institutes of the Academy were evaluated and in part taken over by other institutions, in part dissolved. Buildings, traditional projects, archives and libraries were continued by the BBAW. Today its headquarters are located at the former AdW building, with special projects conducted at the old Prussian Academy on the Unter den Linden. It also has a third office in Potsdam.

== Research ==
=== Research projects ===
The academy sponsors a variety of interdisciplinary, long-term and externally funded projects. These include large German and foreign-language dictionaries; historical-critical publications of ancient, medieval, and modern texts; and editing and interpreting the classical literature by scholars from diverse academic fields. In 2012 the BBAW was home to 47 major projects, the most notable include:

- Alexander von Humboldt Research Project (German: Alexander-von-Humboldt-Forschung): a research initiative is focused on Alexander von Humboldt's correspondence and diaries written during his famous journey to America (1799–1804).
- Corpus Inscriptionum Latinarum
- The Dictionary of Ancient Egyptian (German: Altägyptisches Wörterbuch): A 3000-year corpus publicly available online and continuously updated.
- The German Dictionary (German: Deutsches Wörterbuch), begun by the Brothers Grimm
- The Goethe Dictionary (German: Goethe-Wörterbuch): A conceptual history project that interprets the works of Goethe, containing 3.2 million quotations and 93,000 headwords
- Inscriptiones Graecae: collects and edits all of Europe's ancient Greek inscriptions
- The Complete Works of Marx and Engels (German: Marx-Engels-Gesamtausgabe)
- Monumenta Germaniae Historica: publishes source materials for the constitutional history of the Holy Roman Empire from the 14th century
- Schleiermacher: Critical Edition of the Complete Works (German: Schleiermacher: Kritische Gesamtausgabe): The official edition of Friedrich Schleiermacher's correspondence has been edited by the BBAW since 1979

=== Research centers ===
The Academy has established a number of research centres over time, including centres for basic research, language and history. Each seeks to pool expertise from various fields with the goal of improving cooperation between university and non-university institutions and stimulating regional and international research innovation. In 2012 the BBAW operated three such centers:

- Zentrum Grundlagenforschung Alte Welt: a centre for research of primary sources of the ancient world
- Zentrum "Preußen-Berlin": The "Prussia-Berlin" Research Centre, an amalgamation of projects on the history and culture Prussia and Berlin
- Zentrum Sprache: The Language Research Centre

== Facilities and funding ==
The BBAW operates at three locations in and around Berlin:

- Headquarters
  Jägerstrasse 22/23
  10117 Berlin
- Former Prussian Academy of Sciences building
  Unter den Linden 8
  10117 Berlin
- New building
  Am Neuen Markt 8
  14467 Potsdam

Funding for the Academy comes primarily from the states of Berlin and Brandenburg, with a significant portion of its research supported by the federal and state governments of Germany.

== Salon Sophie Charlotte ==
The Salon Sophie Charlotte is a public evening event organized by the BBAW bringing together leading academics and the general public. Being selected as an academic panelist or speaker is considered highly prestigious. The number of visitors increased over the years to up to 3000 visitors (2017) including academics, public intellectuals and politicians such as Chancellor Angela Merkel.

Eponym of the salon is Sophia Charlotte of Hanover (1668–1705), Queen consort in Prussia as wife of King Frederick I., who initiated, together with Gottfried Wilhelm Leibniz, the founding of the scientific academy in Berlin in 1700. On her estate Lietzow (Charlottenburg) near Berlin maintained Sophie Charlotte, who had a great passion for philosophy, free-spirited salons, which formed a counter-world to strict Prussia etiquette as a social meeting place for discussions, readings or musical events.

The event takes place in BBAW's academy building at Berlin's Gendarmenmarkt. Every year it is organized with a different thematic focus.

- 2006: Kick-off (Auftaktveranstaltung)
- 2007: Europe in the Middle East – The Middle East in Europe (Europa im Nahen Osten – Der Nahe Osten in Europa)
- 2008: Do you know Prussia – really? (Kennen Sie Preußen – wirklich?)
- 2009: The evolution welcomes your children (Die Evolution empfängt Ihre Kinder)
- 2010: Escape from the amazement? (Flucht vor dem Staunen?)
- 2011: Reciprocity. Patrons and donors of the sciences and the arts (Gegenliebe. Gönner und Geber der Wissenschaften und der Künste)
- 2012: Artifacts. Knowledge is art – art is knowledge (Artefakte. Wissen ist Kunst – Kunst ist Wissen)
- 2013: The science and the love (Die Wissenschaft und die Liebe)
- 2014: Europe – a place of the future (Europa – ein Zukunftsort)
- 2015: Put in the light (Ins Licht gerückt)
- 2016: Do we live in the best of all possible worlds? (Leben wir in der besten aller möglichen Welten?)
- 2017: Rebellions, revolutions or reforms? (Rebellionen, Revolutionen oder Reformen?)
- 2018: Language (Sprache)
- ...
- 2026: Resolve Conflicts!

== Medals, prizes and lectures ==
The Academy bestows a number of scientific medals and awards and is host to prestigious lectures:

=== Medals ===
- Helmholtz Medal: Awarded biennially to individuals who have made significant academic contributions to the humanities, social sciences, natural sciences, or medicine. It was first awarded on 2 June 1892 to the physiologist Emil Du Bois-Reymond, physicist Lord Kelvin, and mathematician Karl Weierstraß.
- Leibniz Medal: Awarded to individuals or groups for special services in support of scientific research. It was first awarded to the Berlin art collector James Simon, patron of archeological excavations and museums.

=== Prizes ===
- Academy Prize: An annual prize awarded for outstanding scientific achievement in any disciplinary field. It is awarded at the Academy's Leibniz Day celebration in the summer and includes 50,000 Euros.
- Prize of the Academy (endowed by the Commerzbank Foundation): Awarded biennially for outstanding scientific achievement in the area of research in legal and economic principles. It includes 30,000 Euros is conferred at a joint ceremonial session of the Academy and the Commerzbank Foundation.
- Eva and Klaus Grohe Prize of the Academy: Awarded biennially for outstanding scientific achievement by German scientists with a doctorate in the area of infectious diseases. The prize includes 20,000 Euros and is conferred at the Academy's annual Einstein Day celebration.
- Prize of the Academy (endowed by the Monika Kutzner Foundation): Awarded annually for outstanding scientific achievement in the area of cancer research. It includes 10,000 Euros and is conferred at the Academy's annual Einstein Day celebration.
- Prize of the Academy (endowed by the Peregrinus Foundation): Awarded biennially for outstanding achievements by scholars from eastern and southeastern Europe. It includes 5,100 Euros and is conferred at the Academy's annual Einstein Day celebration.
- Technical Scientific Prize: Awarded for outstanding achievement in the engineering sciences by young engineers and scientists in research or industry. It includes 10,000 Euros and is awarded at the Academy's annual Day of Engineering.
- Walter de Gruyter-Prize: Awarded biennially for outstanding achievement in a subject area covered by the publishing house Walter de Gruyter. It includes 7,500 Euros and is preferably awarded to those who are young, relative to their achievements.
- Liselotte Richter-Prize of the Leibniz-Edition Potsdam: Awarded biennially to senior school students in the province of Brandenburg and includes 1,000 Euros.

=== Lectures ===
- Paul B. Baltes Lecture: Each year a leading international scientist is selected by the Academy to present a lecture which commemorates Paul Baltes' achievements in psychological research and his contributions to psychology. The lecture series is hosted by the Free University of Berlin, the Humboldt University of Berlin, Technische Universität Berlin and the University of Potsdam in collaboration with the Max Planck Institute for Human Development, and is supported by the Margret M. and Paul B. Baltes Foundation.

== Publications ==
The Academy's Proceedings have been variously titled throughout history:

Digitized Abhandlungen issues
				1804	1805	1806	1807	1808	1809
1810	1811	1812	1813	1814	1815	1816	1817	1818	1819
1820	1821	1822	1823	1824	1825	1826	1827	1828	1829
1830	1831	1832; I II III IV	1833	1834	1835	1836	1837	1838	1839
1840	1841	1842	1843	1844	1845	1846	1847	1848	1849
1850	1851	1852	1853	1854	1855	1856	1857	1858	1859
1860	1861	1862	1863	1864	1865	1866	1867	1868	1869; I II
1870	1871	1872	1873	1874	1875	1876	1877	1878	1879
1880	1881	1882	1883	1884	1885	1886	1887	1888	1889
1890	1891	1892	1893	1894	1895	1896	1897	1898	1899/1900
	1901	1902	1903	1904	1905	1906	1907	1908; H M	1909; H M
1910; H M	1911; H M	1912; H M	1913; H M	1914; H M	1915; H M	1916; H M	1917; H M	1918; H M	1919; H M
1920; H M	1921; H M								
Legend:
H	philosophisch-historische Klasse								
M	physikalisch-mathematische Klasse								
1804-1900	Abhandlungen der königlichen Akademie der Wissenschaften zu Berlin								
1901-1917	Abhandlungen der königlich-preußischen Akademie der Wissenschaften zu Berlin								
1918-	Abhandlungen der preußischen Akademie der Wissenschaften								

- Miscellanea Berolinensia (1710–43)
- Histoire de l'académie royale des sciences et belles lettres (1745–69)
- Nouveaux mémoires de l'académie royal (1770–86)
- Sammlung der deutschen Abhandlungen (1788–1803)
- Abhandlungen der Königlich Preußischen Akademie (1804–1917)

Today the BBAW's publications appear in a wide variety of established journals, as well as its own publications such as Jahrbuch, Berichte und Abhandlungen, Debatten and the journal Gegenworte.

== See also ==
- Open access in Germany
- Leibniz Society of Sciences
