= Hermann Grapow =

German Egyptologist (1885–1967)

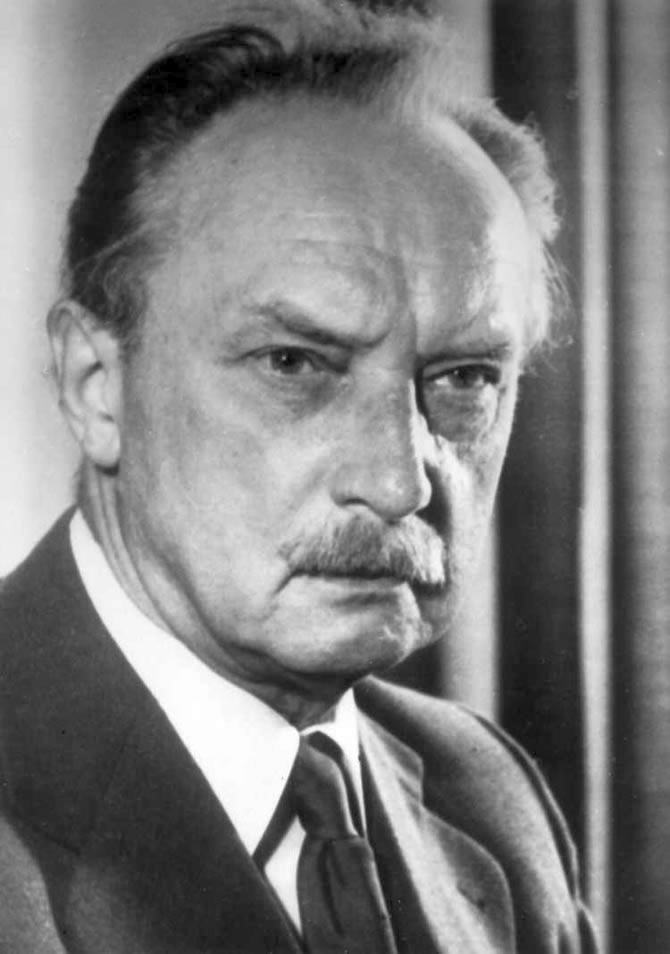
- Born: 1 September 1885; Rostock
- Died: 24 August 1967 (aged 81); Berlin
- Education: Humboldt University of Berlin
- Scientific career
- Fields: Egyptology
- Workplaces: Humboldt University of Berlin
- Notable students: Fritz Hintze

Hermann Grapow (1 September 1885 in Rostock – 24 August 1967 in Berlin) was a German Egyptologist and professor who published together with Adolf Erman the Dictionary of the Egyptian Language.

He studied Egyptology at Humboldt University of Berlin under Adolf Erman. He later taught and became a professor of Egyptology at Humboldt University.

Grapow joined the Nazi Party in 1937.

After World War II, Grapow continued to work towards the completion of the Dictionary of the Egyptian Language. After its publication, he concentrated on studying ancient Egyptian texts that dealt with medicine.

In 1947, together with Richard Hartmann and Diedrich Westermann, he founded the Institute for Oriental Research at the Berlin Academy and was appointed its director in 1956 as the successor to Richard Hartmann.

== Works ==
- Wörterbuch der ägyptischen Sprache, 7 Bände, Berlin, 1925 ff.
- Anatomie und Physiologie, Berlin, 1954
- Kranker, Krankheiten und Arzt : Vom gesunden u. kranken Ägypter, von d. Krankheiten, vom Arzt u. von d. ärztl. Tätigkeit, Berlin 1956
- Die medizinischen Texte in hieroglyphischer Umschreibung autographiert, Berlin, 1958
- Wörterbuch der ägyptischen Drogennamen, Berlin 1959 (gemeinsam mit H. v. Deines)
- Wie die alten Ägypter sich anredeten, wie sie sich grüssten und wie sie miteinander sprachen, Berlin 1960
