= Giza pyramid complex =

Archaeological site near Cairo, Egypt

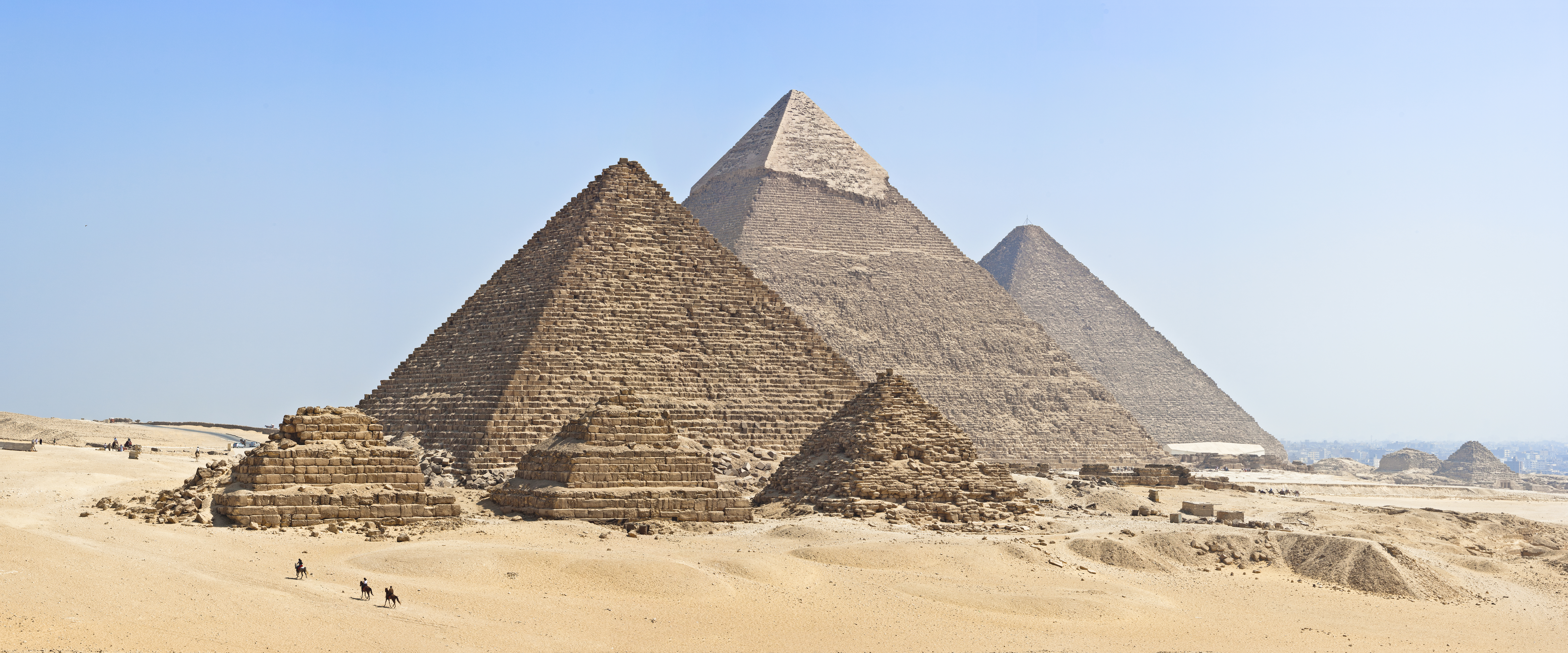
- The three main pyramids at Giza, together with subsidiary pyramids and the remains of other structures

- Location within Egypt
- 29°58′34″N 31°7′58″E
- Type: Monument
- Periods: Early Dynastic Period to Late Period
- Location: Giza, Greater Cairo, Egypt
- Region: Middle Egypt

UNESCO World Heritage Site
- Part of: "Pyramid fields from Giza to Dahshur" part of Memphis and its Necropolis – the Pyramid Fields from Giza to Dahshur
- Includes: Great Pyramid of Giza; Pyramid of Khafre; Pyramid of Menkaure; Great Sphinx of Giza; Giza West Field; Giza East Field; Cemetery GIS; Central Field, Giza
- Criteria: Cultural: i, iii, vi
- Reference: 86-002
- Inscription: 1979 (3rd Session)
- Area: 16,203.36 ha (162.0336 km^{2}; 62.5615 sq mi)

The Giza pyramid complex (also called the Giza necropolis) in Egypt is home to the Great Pyramid, the pyramid of Khafre, and the pyramid of Menkaure, along with their associated pyramid complexes and the Great Sphinx. All were built during the Fourth Dynasty of the Old Kingdom of ancient Egypt, between c. 2600 – c. 2500 BC. The site also includes several temples, cemeteries, and the remains of a workers' village.

The site is at the edge of the Western Desert, approximately 9 km (5.6 mi) west of the Nile River in the city of Giza, and about 13 km (8.1 mi) southwest of the city centre of Cairo. It forms the northernmost part of the 16,000 ha (160 km^{2}; 62 sq mi) Pyramid Fields of the Memphis and its Necropolis UNESCO World Heritage Site, inscribed in 1979. The pyramid fields include the Abusir, Saqqara, and Dahshur pyramid complexes, which were all built in the vicinity of Egypt's ancient capital of Memphis. Further Old Kingdom pyramid fields were located at the sites Abu Rawash, Zawyet El Aryan, and Meidum. Most of the limestone used to build the pyramids originates from the underlying Mokattam Formation.

The Great Pyramid and the Pyramid of Khafre are the largest pyramids built in ancient Egypt, and they have historically been common as emblems of Ancient Egypt in the Western imagination. They were popularised in Hellenistic times, when the Great Pyramid was listed by Antipater of Sidon as one of the Seven Wonders of the World. It is by far the oldest of the Ancient Wonders and the only one still in existence.

== Maadi settlements ==
The earliest settlement of the Giza plateau predates the pyramid complexes. Four jars from the Maadi culture were found at the foot of the Great Pyramid, likely from a disturbed earlier settlement. Further Maadi settlement near the site was uncovered during work on the Greater Cairo Wastewater Project. Recent reassessment of the radiocarbon dating puts the Maadi culture's eponymous settlement to c. 3800 – c. 3400 BC, which is also the likely maximum possible range for the Giza remains.

== Pyramids and Sphinx ==
Giza pyramid complex (map)

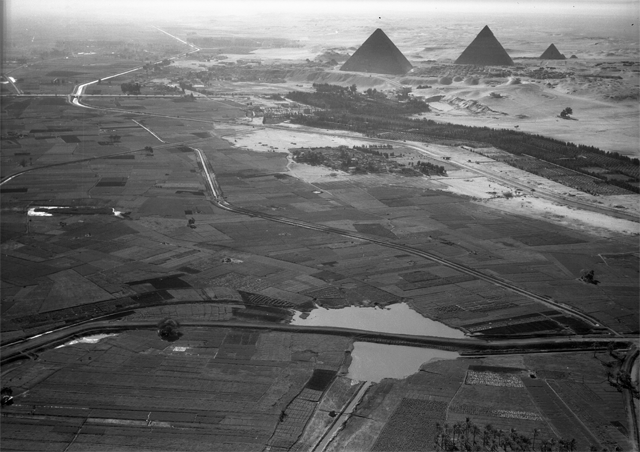
Aerial view from north of cultivated Nile valley with the pyramids in the background (1938)

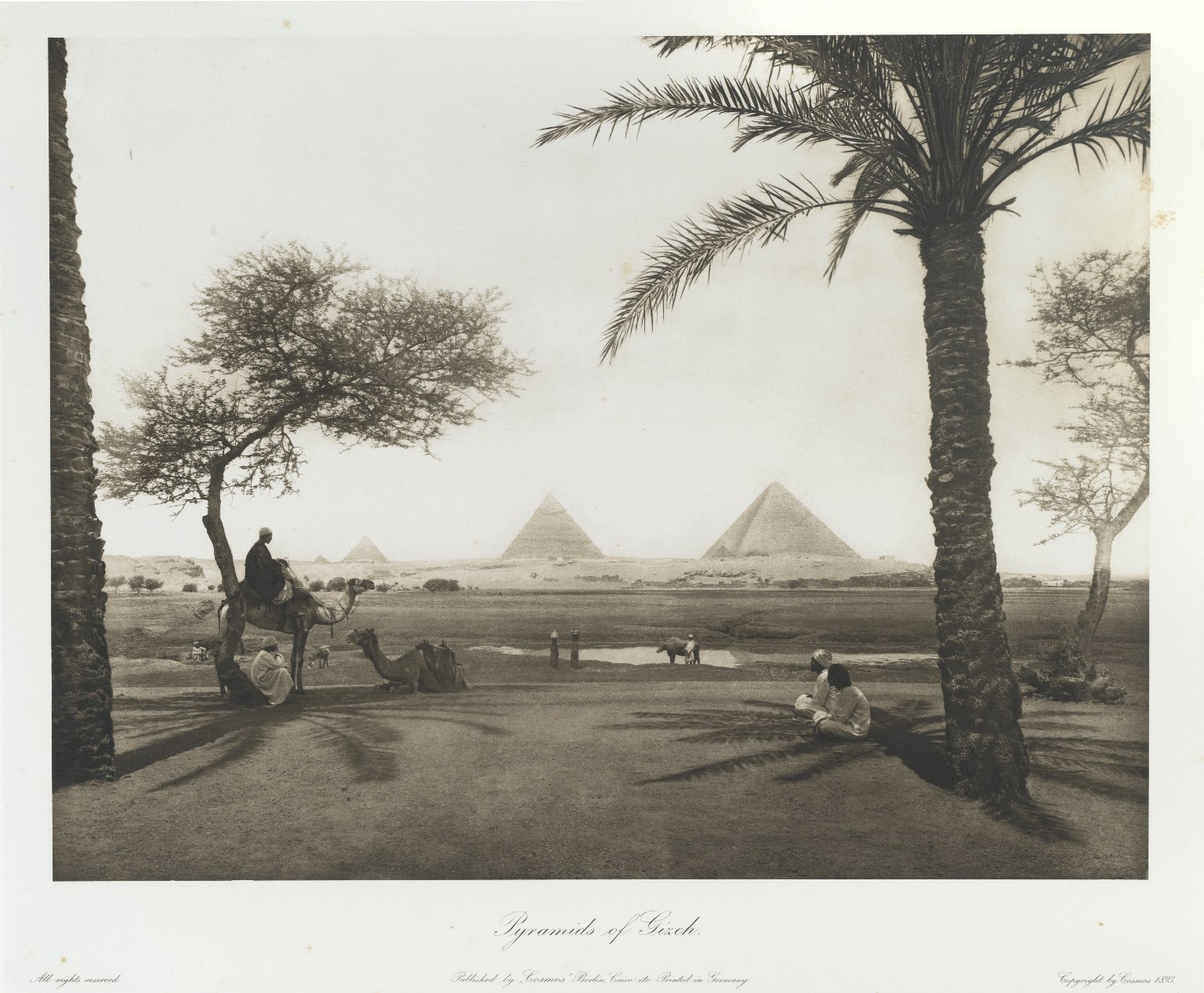
Pyramids of Ghizeh. 1893. Egypt; heliogravure after original views. Wilbour Library of Egyptology. Brooklyn Museum

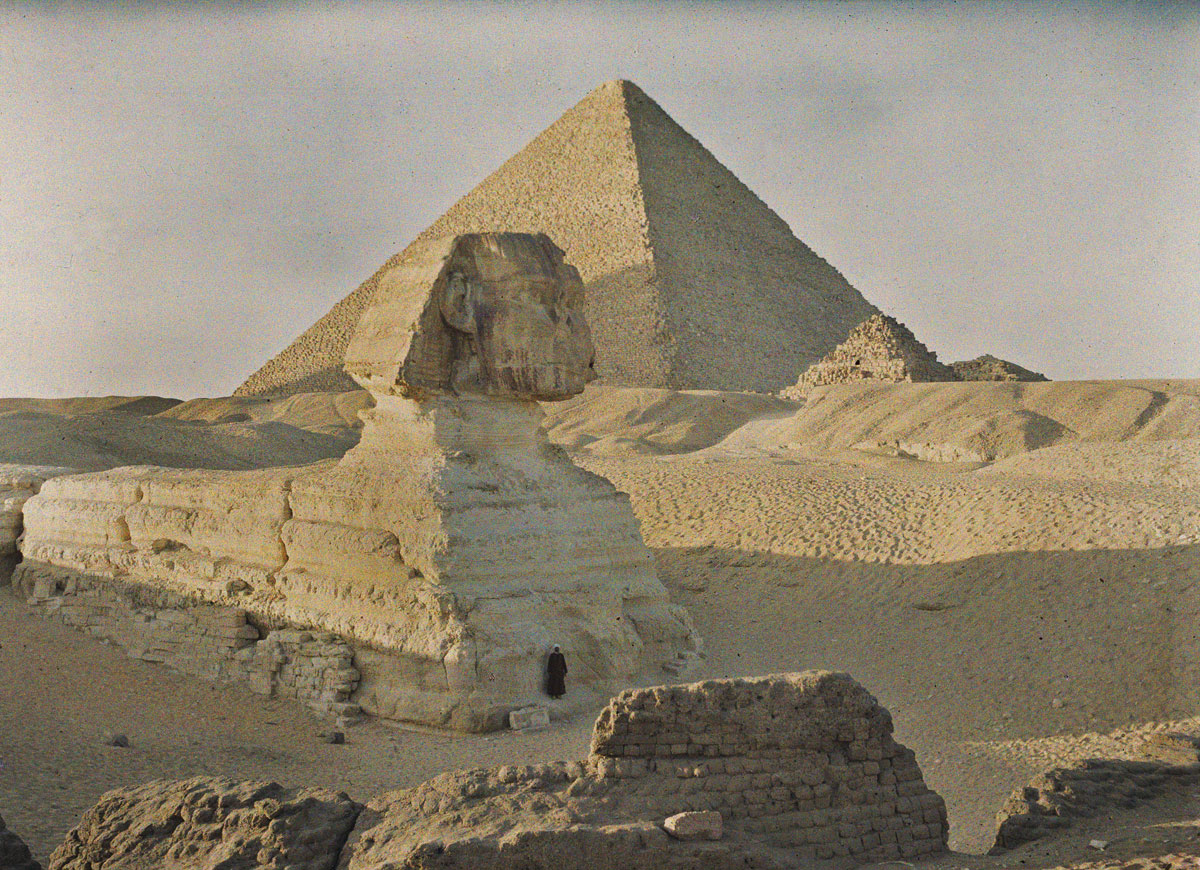
The Great Pyramid and the Great Sphinx of Giza in 1914 (Autochrome Lumière)

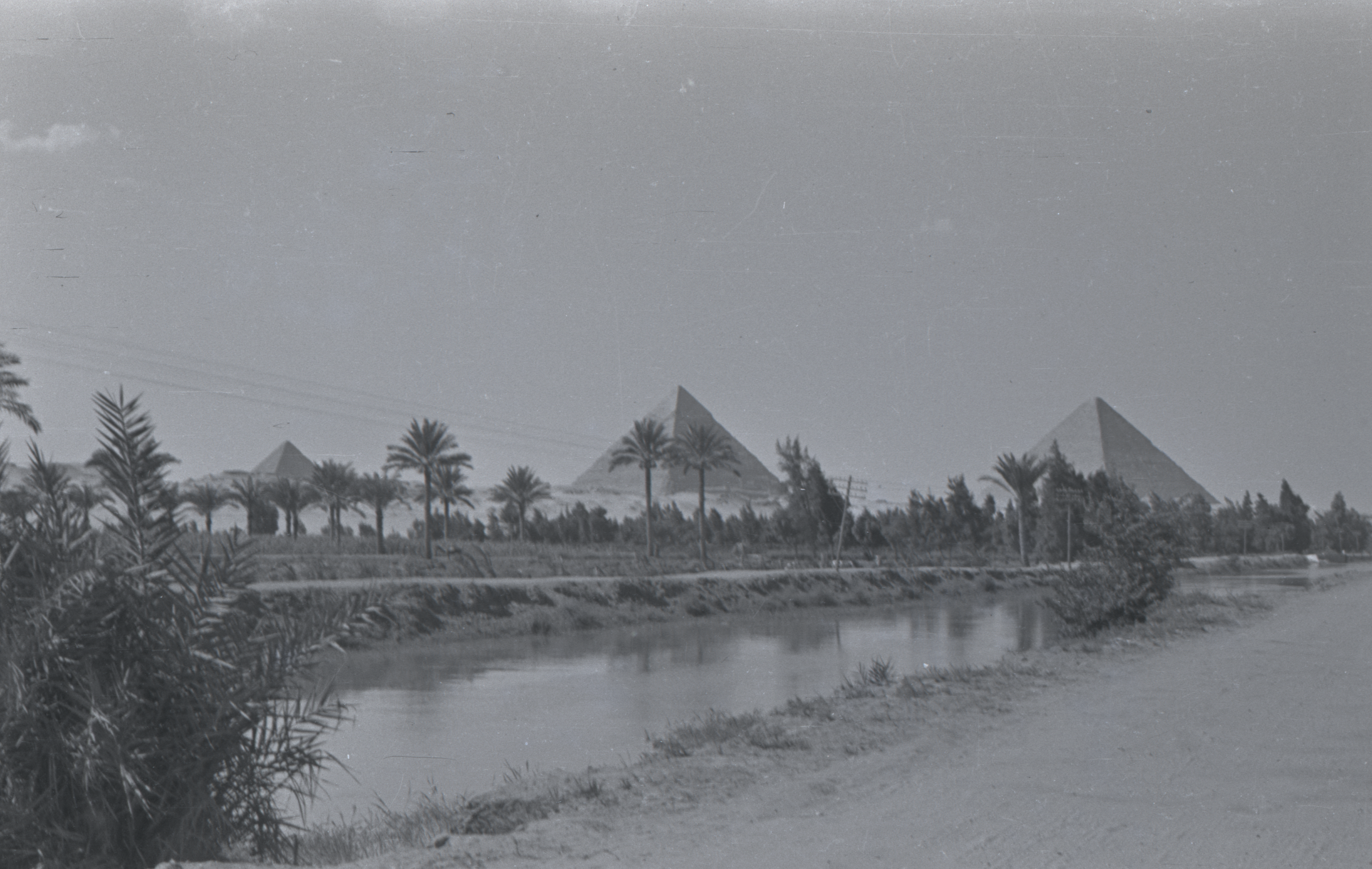
The complex in 1955

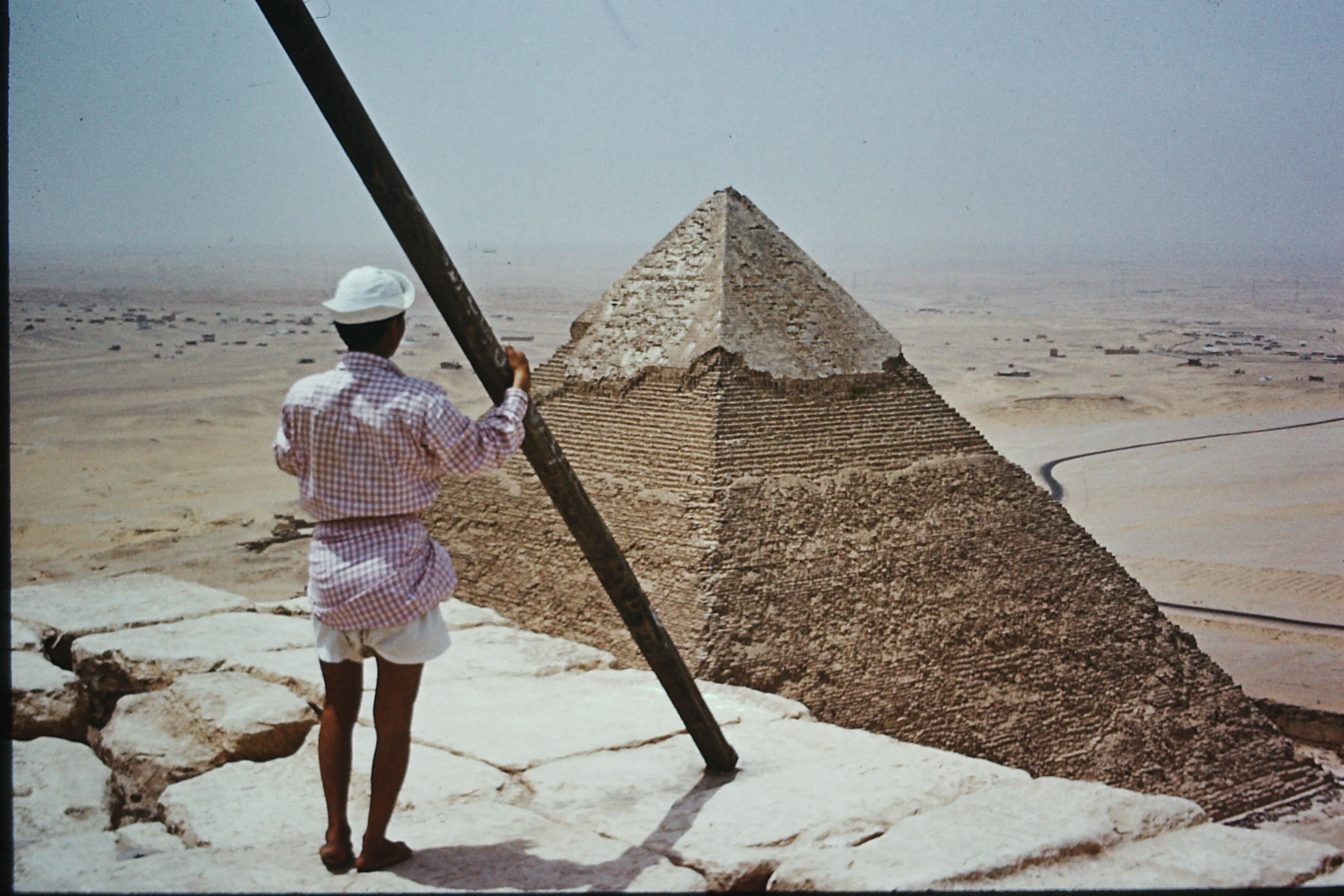
View from top of the Great Pyramid to the Pyramid of Khafre

The Giza pyramid complex consists of the Great Pyramid (also known as the Pyramid of Cheops or Khufu and constructed c. 2580 – c. 2560 BC), the slightly smaller Pyramid of Khafre (or Chephren) a few hundred metres to the south-west, and the relatively modest-sized Pyramid of Menkaure (or Mykerinos) a few hundred metres farther south-west. The Great Sphinx lies on the east side of the complex. Consensus among Egyptologists is that the head of the Great Sphinx is that of Khafre. Along with these major monuments are a number of smaller satellite edifices, known as "queens" pyramids, causeways, and temples. Besides the archaeological structures, the ancient landscape has also been investigated.

=== Khufu's complex ===
Khufu's pyramid complex consists of a valley temple, now buried beneath the village of Nazlet el-Samman; diabase paving and nummulitic limestone walls have been found but the site has not been excavated. The valley temple was connected to a causeway that was largely destroyed when the village was constructed. The causeway led to the Mortuary Temple of Khufu, which was connected to the pyramid. Of this temple, the basalt pavement is the only thing that remains. The king's pyramid has three smaller queens' pyramids (G1-a, G1-b, and G1-c) associated with it and three boat pits. The boat pits contained a ship, and the two pits on the south side of the pyramid contained intact ships when excavated. One of these ships, the Khufu ship, has been restored and was originally displayed at the Giza Solar boat museum, then subsequently moved to the Grand Egyptian Museum.

Khufu's pyramid still has a limited number of casing stones at its base. These casing stones were made of fine white limestone quarried at Tura.

=== Khafre's complex ===
Khafre's pyramid complex consists of a valley temple, the Sphinx temple, a causeway, a mortuary temple, and the king's pyramid. The valley temple yielded several statues of Khafre. Several were found in a well in the floor of the temple by Mariette in 1860. Others were found during successive excavations by Sieglin (1909–1910), Junker, Reisner, and Hassan. Khafre's complex contained five boat-pits and a subsidiary pyramid with a serdab.

Khafre's pyramid appears larger than the adjacent Khufu Pyramid by virtue of its more elevated location, and the steeper angle of inclination of its construction—it is, in fact, smaller in both height and volume. Khafre's pyramid retains a prominent display of casing stones at its apex.

=== Menkaure's complex ===
Menkaure's pyramid complex consists of a valley temple, a causeway, a mortuary temple, and the king's pyramid. The valley temple once contained several statues of Menkaure. During the 5th Dynasty, a smaller ante-temple was added on to the valley temple. The mortuary temple also yielded several statues of Menkaure. The king's pyramid, completed c. 2510 BC, has three subsidiary or queen's pyramids. Of the four major monuments, only Menkaure's pyramid is seen today without any of its original polished limestone casing.

=== Sphinx ===
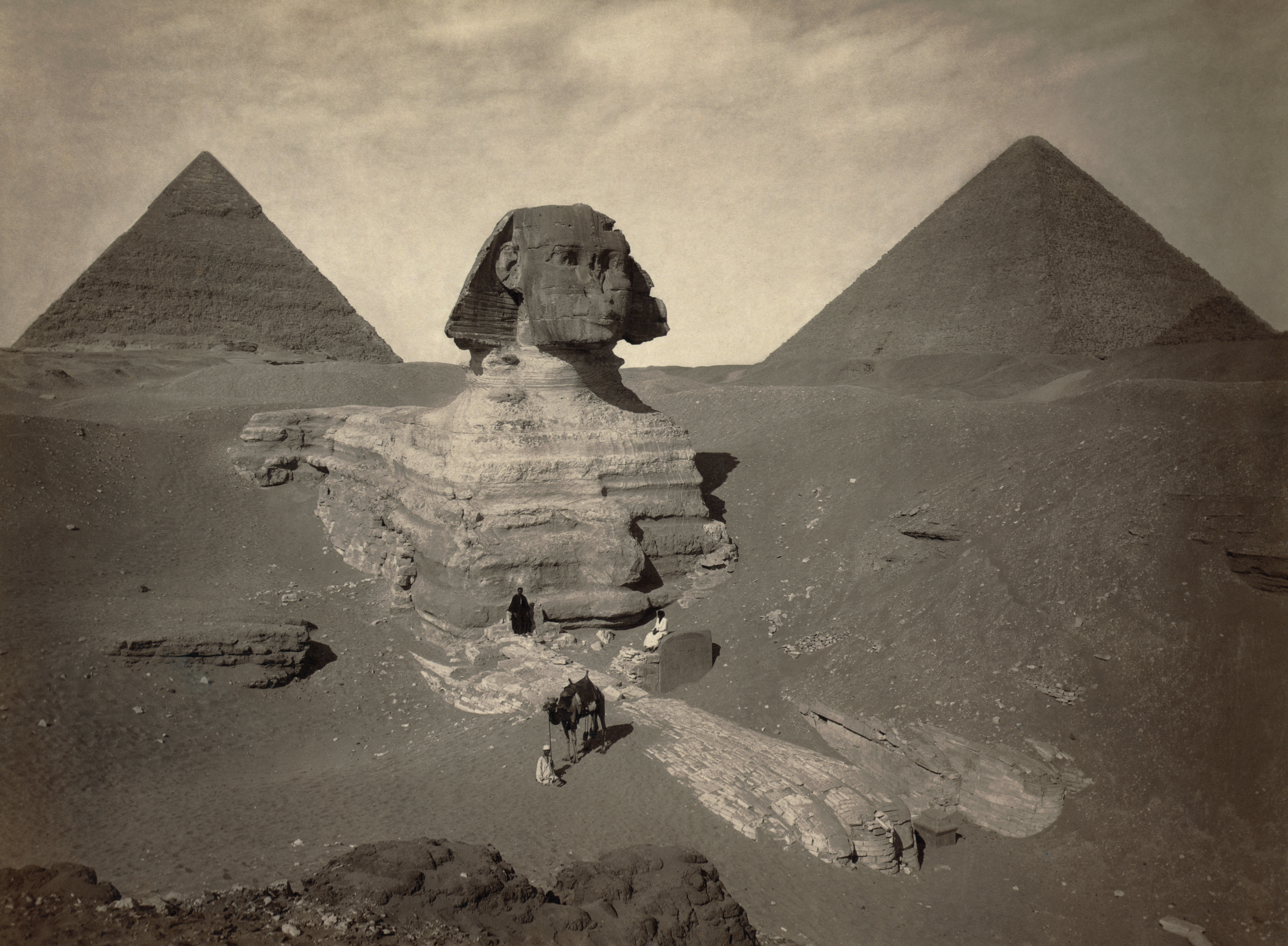
The Sphinx partially excavated, photo taken between 1867 and 1899

The Sphinx dates from the reign of king Khafre. During the New Kingdom, Amenhotep II dedicated a new temple to Hauron-Haremakhet and this structure was added onto by later rulers.

=== Tomb of Queen Khentkaus I ===
Khentkaus I was buried in Giza. Her tomb is known as LG 100 and G 8400 and is located in the Central Field, near the valley temple of Menkaure. The pyramid complex of Queen Khentkaus includes her pyramid, a boat pit, a valley temple, and a pyramid town.

== Construction ==
Most construction theories are based on the idea that the pyramids were built by moving huge stones from a quarry and dragging and lifting them into place. Disagreements arise over the feasibility of the different proposed methods by which the stones were conveyed and placed.

One likely method of transportation involved placing large slabs of stone on wooden sledges, and pushing it over ground that had been wet down with water to facilitate a smoother transfer of materials.

In building the pyramids, the architects might have developed their techniques over time. They would select a site on a relatively flat area of bedrock—not sand—which provided a stable foundation. After carefully surveying the site and laying down the first level of stones, they constructed the pyramids in horizontal levels, one on top of the other.

The Great Pyramid was a grand scale architectural project, and at the time of its construction was the tallest architectural structure in the world. 5.5 million tonnes of limestone and 8,000 tonnes of granite were used to build the pyramid, with the majority of the stone being quarried on site, and some being quarried in Tura, and transported by barge back across the Nile to the Giza plateau. Only a few exterior blocks remain in place at the bottom of the Great Pyramid. During the Middle Ages (5th century to 15th century), people may have taken the rest away for building projects in the city of Cairo.

For the softer limestone, copper tools were used to cut and chisel the slabs. For the harder granite, rough powders and sands were used to wear down the rock, and copper tools were then used to cut it.

To ensure that the pyramid remained symmetrical, the exterior casing stones all had to be equal in height and width. Workers might have marked all the blocks to indicate the angle of the pyramid wall and trimmed the surfaces carefully so that the blocks fit together. During construction, the outer surface of the stone was smooth limestone; excess stone has eroded over time.

New insights into the closing stages of the Great Pyramid building were provided by the 2013 find of Wadi el-Jarf papyri, especially the diary of inspector Merer, whose team was assigned to deliver the white limestone from Tura quarries to Giza. The journal was already published, as well as a popular account of the importance of this discovery.

Over the centuries, there has been much dispute about the amount of time and labor that went into the construction of the pyramids, with the earliest account of construction, recorded by Greek Historian Herodotus, claiming the project took 20 years, and 100,000 workers, who worked in three month shifts at a time. Modern historians posit the project took somewhere between 20 and 27 years, and somewhere between 20,000-30,000 year-round workers.

=== Purpose ===
The Khufu Pyramid Complex (also known as The Great Pyramid of Giza, the largest and oldest of the Giza Pyramids) was initially commissioned by the Egyptian Pharaoh Khufu (also widely known as Cheops, the Greek version of the name used by the Historian Herodotus). After Khufu’s death, the Khafre Pyramid was built for Khufu’s son. Finally, the Menkaure Pyramid was built for Khafre’s son. The pyramids were built as tombs for their respective Pharaohs, and a place to facilitate the Pharaohs’ ascension. A portion of the pharaoh's spirit called his ka was believed to remain with his corpse. Proper care of the remains was necessary in order for the "former Pharaoh to perform his new duties as king of the dead". It is theorized the pyramid not only served as a tomb for the pharaoh, but also as a storage pit for various items he would need in the afterlife. The people of Ancient Egypt believed that death on Earth was the start of a journey to the next world. The embalmed body of the king was entombed underneath or within the pyramid to protect it and allow his transformation and ascension to the afterlife.

The pyramids were also meant to provide a direct connection to the Egyptian sun god Ra (who was said to be the father of all pharaohs) on his daily voyage across the sky. The shape of the pyramids were supposed to symbolize the rays of the sun, and the structure was slanted to provide a direct ramp/stairway to Ra for the spirit of the deceased Pharaoh.

=== Astronomy ===
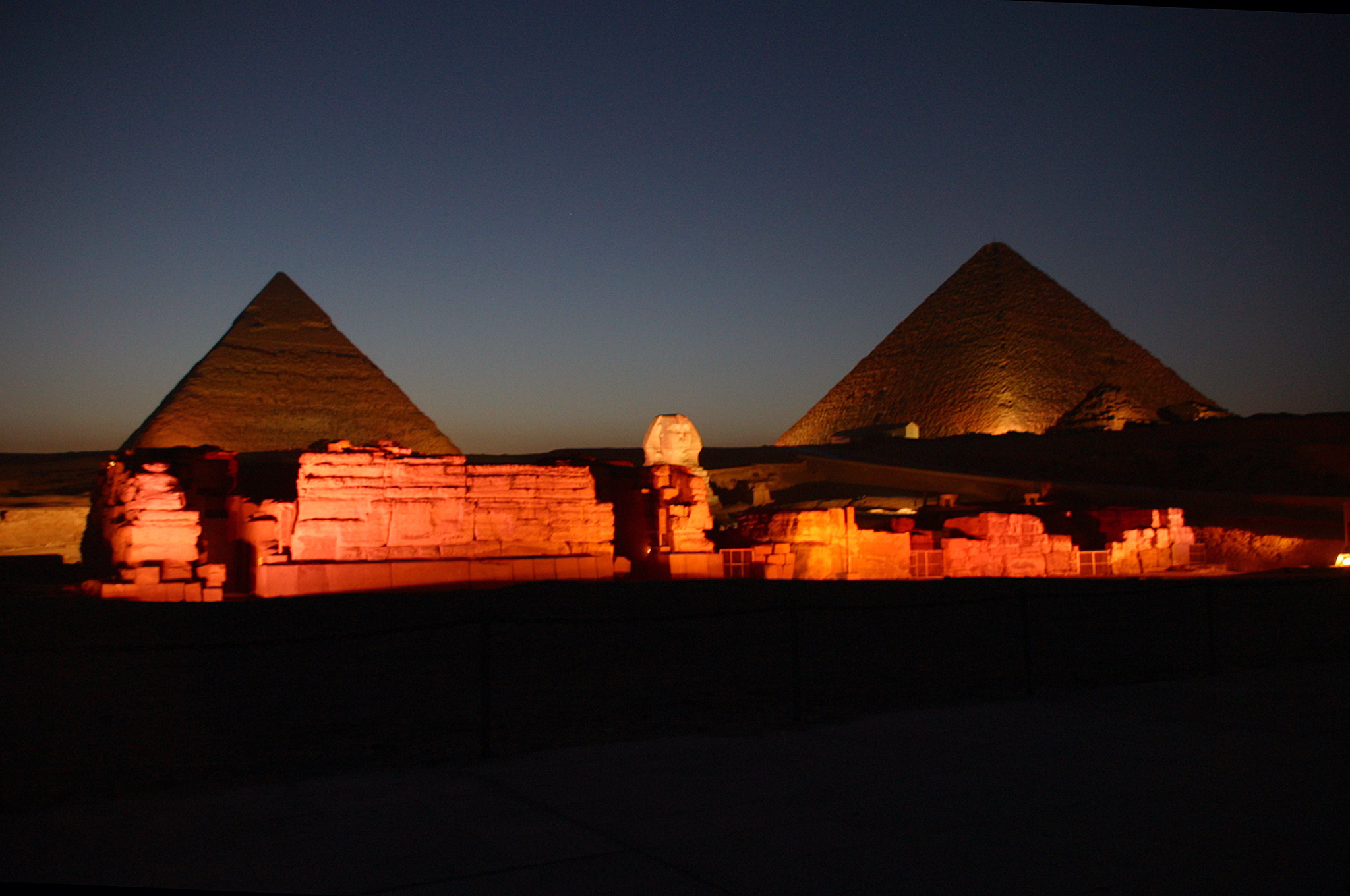
The Giza pyramid complex at night

There are several prominent theories surrounding the astronomical significance of the pyramids, which are oriented towards cardinal points within one-fifteenth of a degree. The Orion Correlation Theory posits that the pyramids directly align with the three stars of Orion’s belt. Other theories suggest that the pyramids were built to align with the sun on the day of the fall equinox, building further connection to the sun god Ra. This theory suggests that Ancient Egyptians used a gnoman—a vertical rod set on a sun dial, whose shadow indicates the time of day—to track the movement of the sun on the equinox.

== Workers' village ==
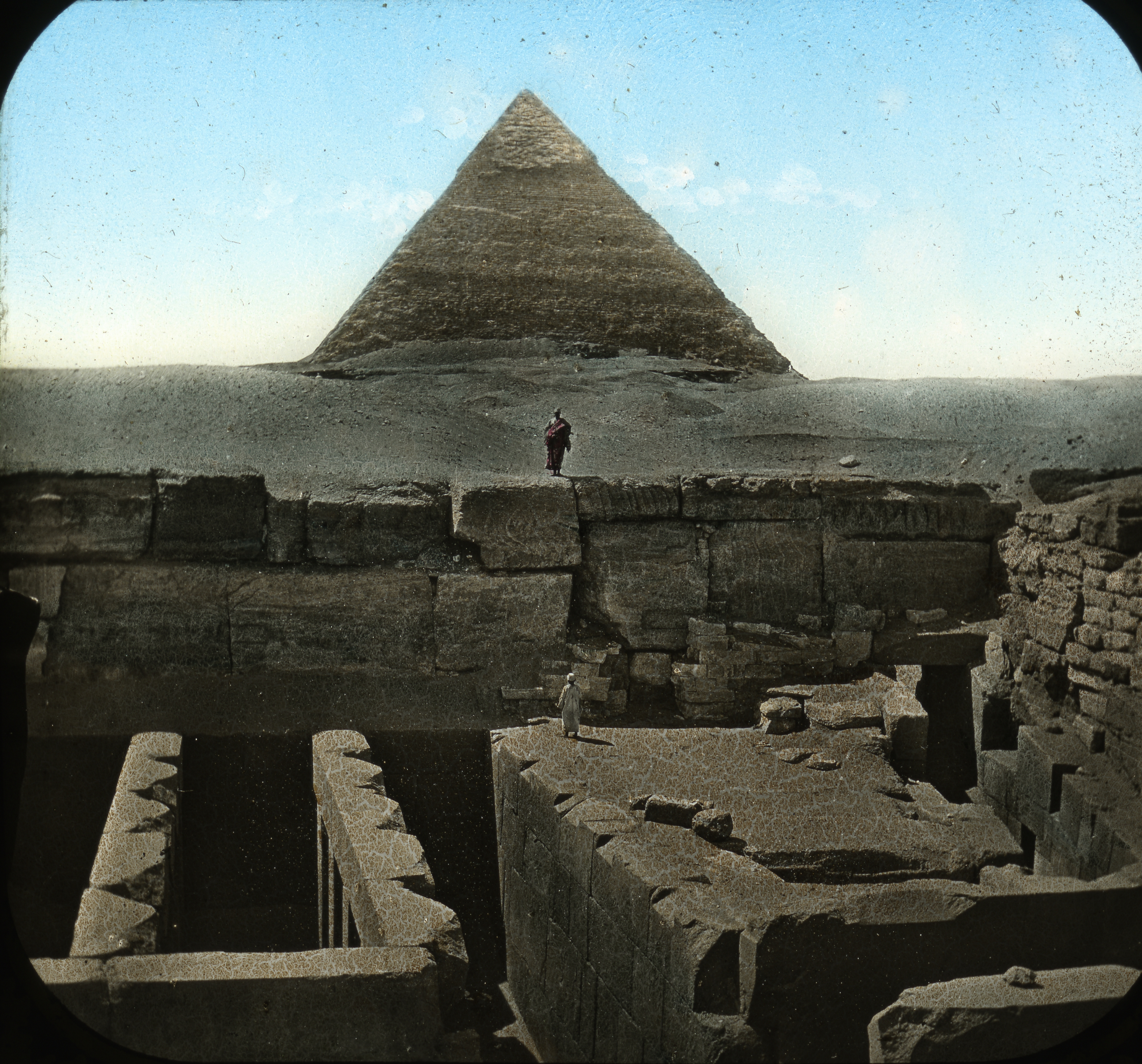
One face of the Pyramid of Khafre at Giza, as seen from Khafre's valley temple, Brooklyn Museum

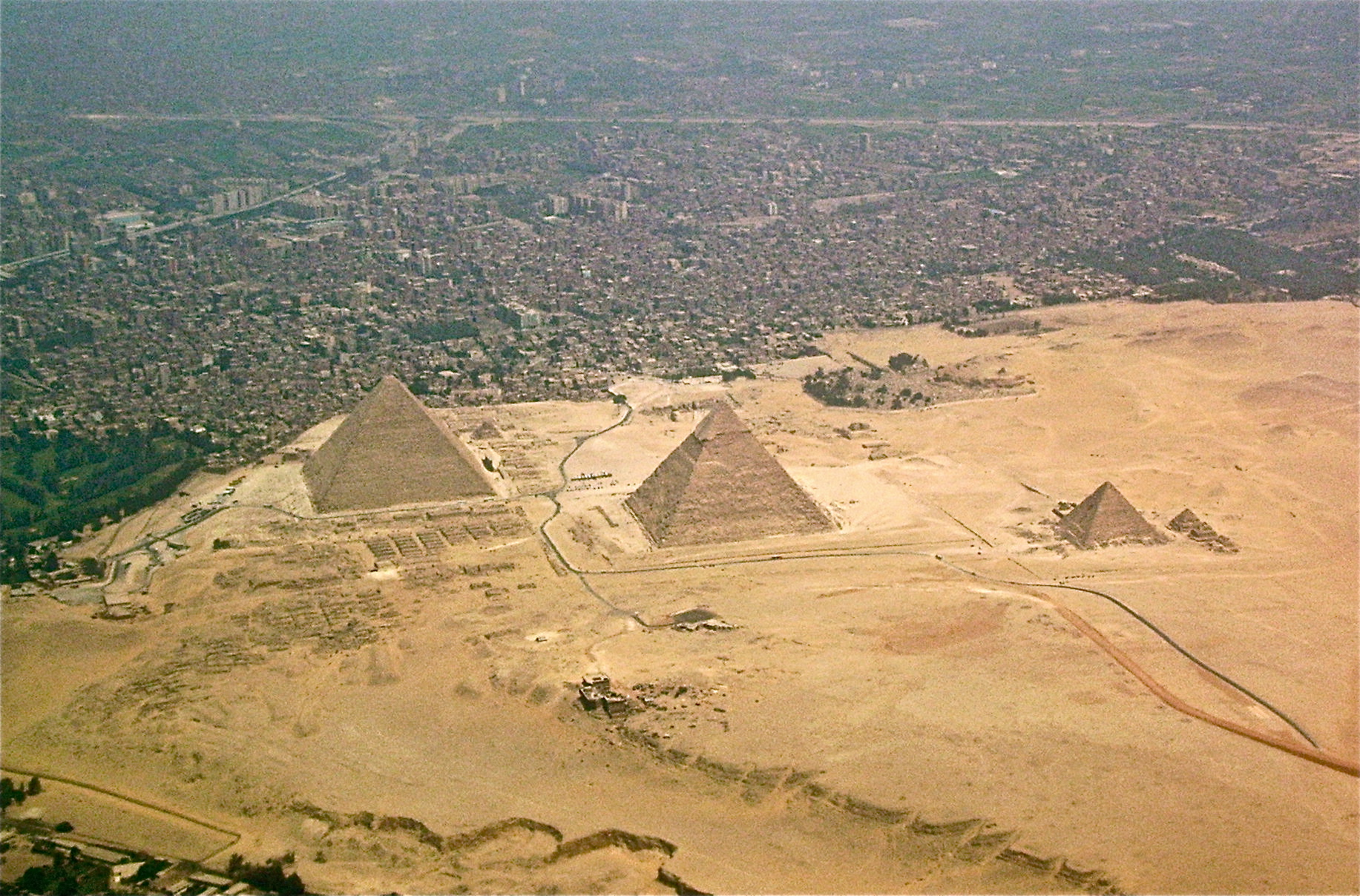
Giza pyramid complex seen from above

3D overview of the Giza complex

The work of quarrying, moving, setting, and sculpting the huge amount of stone used to build the pyramids might have been accomplished by several thousand skilled workers, unskilled laborers and supporting workers. Bakers, carpenters, water carriers, and others were also needed for the project. Along with the methods used to construct the pyramids, there is also wide speculation regarding the exact number of workers needed for a building project of this magnitude. When Greek historian Herodotus visited Giza in 450 BC, he was told by Egyptian priests that "the Great Pyramid had taken 400,000 men 20 years to build, working in three-month shifts 100,000 men at a time." Evidence from the tombs indicates that a workforce of 10,000 laborers working in three-month shifts took around 30 years to build a pyramid.

The Giza pyramid complex is surrounded by a large stone wall, outside which Mark Lehner and his team discovered a town where the pyramid workers were housed. The village is located to the southeast of the Khafre and Menkaure complexes. Among the discoveries at the workers' village are communal sleeping quarters, bakeries, breweries, and kitchens (with evidence showing that bread, beef, and fish were dietary staples), a copper workshop, a hospital, and a cemetery (where some of the skeletons were found with signs of trauma associated with accidents on a building site). The metal processed at the site was the so-called arsenical copper. The same material was also identified among the copper artefacts from the "Kromer" site, from the reigns of Khufu and Khafre.

Lehner’s excavation of the worker’s village paints a clear picture of the pyramid laborers, highlighting a higher quality of life than previously believed. The workers had access to high quality food, were given proper burials, and lived under an organized labor system, where workers contributed to various societal and construction functions of their own free will. This archaeological evidence directly opposes previous beliefs that the pyramids were the result of intensive slave labor. This misconception began with Greek Historian Herodotus, and was later popularized in pop cultural depictions of the building of the pyramids.

The workers' town appears to date from the middle 4th Dynasty (2520–2472 BC), after the accepted time of Khufu and completion of the Great Pyramid. According to Lehner and the AERA team:

The development of this urban complex must have been rapid. All of the construction probably happened in the 35 to 50 years that spanned the reigns of Khafre and Menkaure, builders of the Second and Third Giza Pyramids.

Using pottery shards, seal impressions, and stratigraphy to date the site, the team further concludes:

The picture that emerges is that of a planned settlement, some of the world's earliest urban planning, securely dated to the reigns of two Giza pyramid builders: Khafre (2520–2494 BC) and Menkaure (2490–2472 BC).

Radiocarbon data for the Old Kingdom Giza plateau and the workers' settlement were published in 2006, and then re-evaluated in 2011.

== Cemeteries ==
As the pyramids were constructed, the mastabas for lesser royals were constructed around them. Near the pyramid of Khufu, the main cemetery is G 7000, which lies in the East Field located to the east of the main pyramid and next to the Queen's pyramids. These cemeteries around the pyramids were arranged along streets and avenues. Cemetery G 7000 was one of the earliest and contained tombs of wives, sons, and daughters of these 4th Dynasty rulers. On the other side of the pyramid in the West Field, the royals' sons Wepemnofret and Hemiunu were buried in Cemetery G 1200 and Cemetery G 4000, respectively. These cemeteries were further expanded during the 5th and 6th Dynasties.

=== West Field ===
The West Field is located to the west of Khufu's pyramid. It is divided into smaller areas such as the cemeteries referred to as the Abu Bakr Excavations (1949–1950, 1950–1951, 1952, and 1953), and several cemeteries named based on the mastaba numbers such as Cemetery G 1000, Cemetery G 1100, etc. The West Field contains Cemetery G1000 – Cemetery G1600, and Cemetery G 1900. Further cemeteries in this field are: Cemeteries G 2000, G 2200, G 2500, G 3000, G 4000, and G 6000. Three other cemeteries are named after their excavators: Junker Cemetery West, Junker Cemetery East, and Steindorff Cemetery.

Cemeteries in the West Field at Giza
Cemetery	Time Period	Excavation	Comments
Abu Bakr Excavations	the 5th and 6th Dynasty	(1949–1953)	
Cemetery G 1000	the 5th and 6th Dynasty	Reisner (1903–1905)	Stone built mastabas
Cemetery G 1100	the 5th and 6th Dynasty	Reisner (1903–1905)	Brick built mastabas
Cemetery G 1200	Mainly 4th Dynasty	Reisner (1903–1905)	Some members of Khufu's family are buried here; Wepemnefert (King's Son), Kaem-ah (King's Son), Nefertiabet (King's Daughter)
Cemetery G 1300	the 5th and 6th Dynasty	Reisner (1903–1905)	Brick built mastabas
Cemetery G 1400	the 5th Dynasty or later	Reisner (1903–1905)	Two men who were prophets of Khufu
Cemetery G 1500		Reisner (1931?)	Only one mastaba (G 1601)
Cemetery G 1600	the 5th Dynasty or later	Reisner (1931)	Two men who were prophets of Khufu
Cemetery G 1900		Reisner (1931)	Only one mastaba (G 1903)
Cemetery G 2000	the 5th and 6th Dynasty	Reisner (1905–1906)	
Cemetery G 2100	the 4th and 5th Dynasty and later	Reisner (1931)	G 2100 belongs to Merib, a King's (grand-)Son and G2101 belongs to a 5th Dynasty king's daughter.
Cemetery G 2200	Late 4th or early 5th Dynasty	Reisner ?	Mastaba G 2220
Cemetery G 2300	5th Dynasty and 6th Dynasty	Reisner (1911–1913)	Includes mastabas of Vizier Senedjemib-Inti and his family.
Cemetery G 2400	5th Dynasty and 6th Dynasty	Reisner (1911–1913)	
Cemetery G 2500		Reisner	
Cemetery G 3000	6th Dynasty	Fisher and Eckley Case Jr. (1915)	
Cemetery G 4000	4th Dynasty and later	Junker and Reisner (1931)	Includes tomb of the vizier Hemiunu
Cemetery G 6000	5th Dynasty	Reisner (1925–1926)	
Junker Cemetery (West)	Late Old Kingdom	Junker (1926–1927)	Includes mastaba of the dwarf Seneb
Steindorff Cemetery	5th Dynasty and 6th Dynasty	Steindorff (1903–1907)	
Junker Cemetery (East)	Late Old Kingdom	Junker	

=== East Field ===
The East Field is located to the east of Khufu's pyramid and contains cemetery G 7000. This cemetery was a burial place for some of the family members of Khufu. The cemetery also includes mastabas from tenants and priests of the pyramids dated to the 5th Dynasty and 6th Dynasty.

Cemeteries G 7000 – Royalty
Tomb number	Owner	Comments
G 7000 X	Hetepheres I	Mother of Khufu
G 7010	Nefertkau I	Daughter of Sneferu, half-sister of Khufu
G 7060	Nefermaat I	Son of Nefertkau I and Vizier of Khafre
G 7070	Sneferukhaf	Son of Nefermaat II
G 7110–7120	Kawab and Hetepheres II	Kawab was the eldest son of Khufu
G 7130–7140	Khufukhaf I and Nefertkau II	King's Son and Vizier and his wife
G 7210–7220	Djedefhor	King's Son of Khufu and Meritites
G 7350	Hetepheres II	Wife of Kawab and later wife of Djedefre
G 7410–7420	Meresankh II and Horbaef	Meresankh was a king's daughter and king's wife
G 7430–7440	Minkhaf I	Son of Khufu and Vizier of Khafre
G 7510	Ankhhaf	Son of Sneferu and Vizier of Khafre
G 7530–7540	Meresankh III	Daughter of Kawab and Hetepheres II, wife of Khafre
G 7550	Duaenhor	Probably son of Kawab and thus a grandson of Khufu
G 7560	Akhethotep and Meritites II	Meritites is a daughter of Khufu
G 7660	Kaemsekhem	Son of Kawab, a grandson of Khufu, served as Director of the Palace
G 7760	Mindjedef	Son of Kawab, a grandson of Khufu, served as Treasurer
G 7810	Djaty	Son of Queen Meresankh II

=== Cemetery GIS ===
This cemetery dates from the time of Menkaure (Junker) or earlier (Reisner), and contains several stone-built mastabas dating from as late as the 6th Dynasty. Tombs from the time of Menkaure include the mastabas of the royal chamberlain Khaemnefert, the King's son Khufudjedef (master of the royal largesse), and an official named Niankhre.

=== Central Field ===
The Central Field contains several burials of royal family members. The tombs range in date from the end of the 4th Dynasty to the 5th Dynasty or even later.

Central Field – Royalty
Tomb number	Owner	Comments
G 8172 (LG 86)	Nebemakhet	Son of Khafre, served as vizier
G 8158 (LG 87)	Nikaure	Son of Khafre and Persenet, served as vizier
G 8156 (LG 88)	Persenet	Wife of Khafre
G 8154 (LG 89)	Sekhemkare	Son of Khafre and Hekenuhedjet
G 8140	Niuserre	Son of Khafre, Vizier in the 5th Dynasty
G 8130	Niankhre	King's Son, probably 5th Dynasty
G 8080 (LG 92)	Iunmin	King's Son, end of 4th Dynasty
G 8260	Babaef	Son of Khafre, end of 4th Dynasty
G 8466	Iunre	Son of Khafre, end of 4th Dynasty
G 8464	Hemetre	Probably daughter of Khafre, end of 4th Dynasty or 5th Dynasty
G 8460	Ankhmare	King's son and vizier, end of 4th Dynasty
G 8530	Rekhetre	King's daughter (of Khafre) and Queen, end of 4th Dynasty or 5th Dynasty
G 8408	Bunefer	King's daughter and Queen, end of 4th Dynasty or 5th Dynasty
G 8978	Khamerernebty I	King's daughter and Queen, middle to end of 4th Dynasty. Also known as the Galarza Tomb

Tombs dating from the Saite and later period were found near the causeway of Khafre and the Great Sphinx. These tombs include the tomb of a commander of the army named Ahmose and his mother Queen Nakhtubasterau, who was the wife of Pharaoh Amasis II.

=== South Field ===
The South Field includes mastabas dating from the 1st Dynasty to 3rd Dynasty as well as later burials. Of the more significant of these early dynastic tombs are one referred to as "Covington's tomb", otherwise known as Mastaba T, and the large Mastaba V which contained artifacts naming the 1st Dynasty pharaoh Djet. Other tombs date from the late Old Kingdom (5th and 6th Dynasty). The south section of the field contains several tombs dating from the Saite period and later.

=== Tombs of the pyramid builders ===
In 1990, tombs belonging to the pyramid workers were discovered alongside the pyramids, with an additional burial site found nearby in 2009. Although not mummified, they had been buried in mudbrick tombs with beer and bread to support them in the afterlife. The tombs' proximity to the pyramids and the manner of burial supports the theory that they were paid laborers who took pride in their work and were not slaves, as was previously thought. Evidence from the tombs indicates that a workforce of 10,000 laborers working in three-month shifts took around 30 years to build a pyramid. Most of the workers appear to have come from poor families. Specialists such as architects, masons, metalworkers, and carpenters were permanently employed by the king to fill positions that required the most skill.

== Shafts ==
There are multiple burial-shafts and various unfinished shafts and tunnels located in the Giza complex that were discovered and mentioned prominently by Selim Hassan in his report Excavations at Giza 1933–1934. He states: "Very few of the Saitic [referring to the Saite Period] shafts have been thoroughly examined, for the reason that most of them are flooded."

=== Osiris Shaft ===
The Osiris Shaft is a narrow burial-shaft leading to three levels for a tomb and below it a flooded area. It was mentioned by Hassan, and a thorough excavation was conducted by a team led by Hawass in 1999. It was opened to tourists in November 2017.

== New Kingdom and Late Period ==
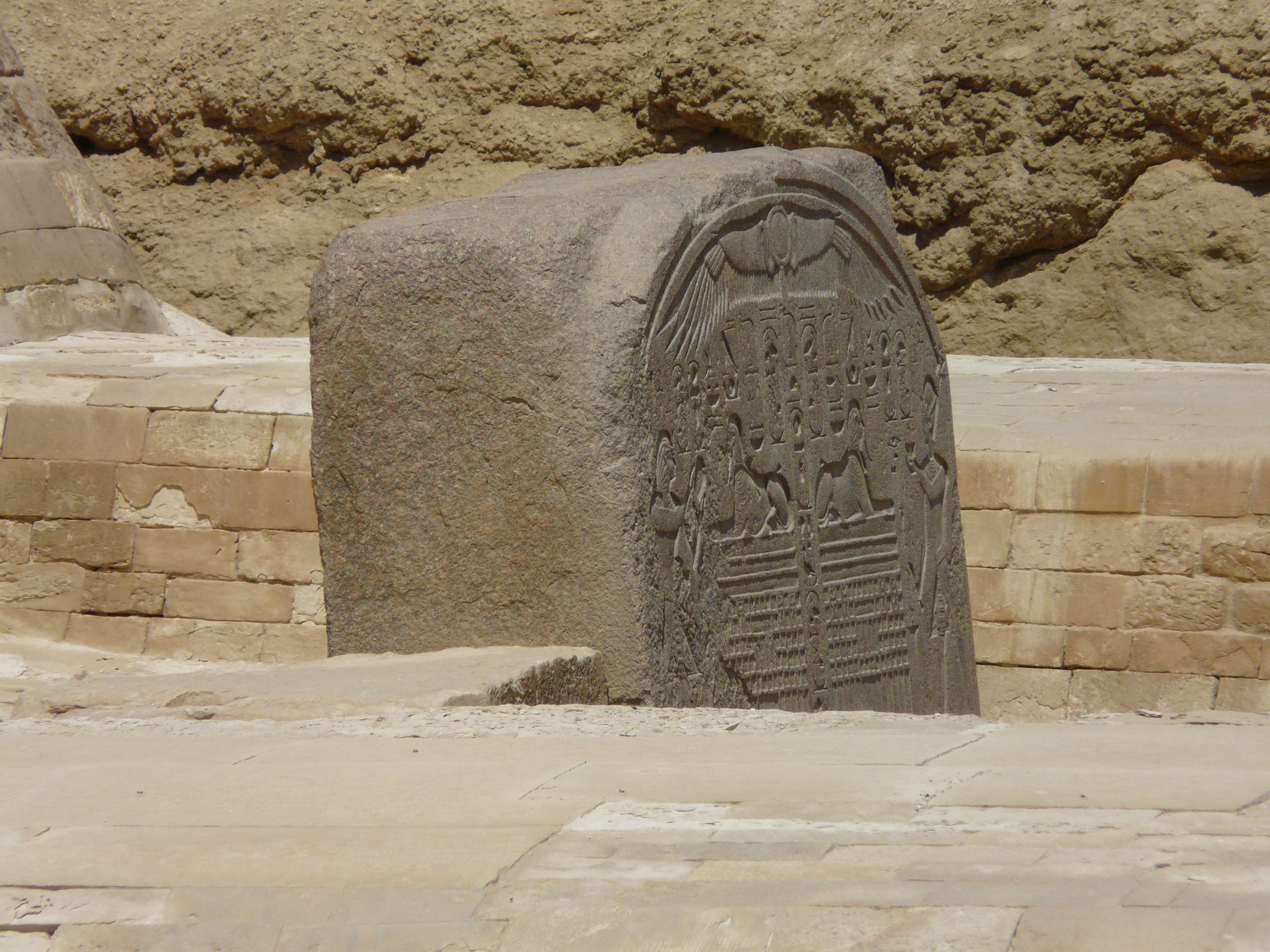
The Dream Stele between the Sphinx's front legs

During the New Kingdom Giza was still an active site. A brick-built chapel was constructed near the Sphinx during the early 18th Dynasty, probably by King Thutmose I. Amenhotep II built a temple dedicated to Hauron-Haremakhet near the Sphinx. As a prince, the future pharaoh Thutmose IV visited the pyramids and the Sphinx; he reported being told in a dream that if he cleared the sand that had built up around the Sphinx, he would be rewarded with kingship. This event is recorded in the Dream Stele, which he had installed between the Sphinx's front legs.

During the early years of his reign, Thutmose IV, together with his wife Queen Nefertari, had stelae erected at Giza.

Pharaoh Tutankhamun had a structure built, which is now referred to as the king's resthouse.

During the 19th Dynasty, Seti I added to the temple of Hauron-Haremakhet, and his son Ramesses II erected a stela in the chapel before the Sphinx and usurped the resthouse of Tutankhamun.

During the 21st Dynasty, the Temple of Isis Mistress-of-the-Pyramids was reconstructed. During the 26th Dynasty, a stela made in this time mentions Khufu and his Queen Henutsen.

== Division of the 1903–1905 excavation of the Giza Necropolis ==
In 1903, rights to excavate the West Field and Pyramids of the Giza Necropolis were divided by three institutions from Italy, Germany, and the United States of America.

=== Background ===
Prior to the division of the Giza Plateau into three institutional concessions in 1903, amateur and private excavations at the Giza Necropolis had been permitted to operate. The work of these amateur archaeologists failed to meet high scientific standards. Montague Ballard, for instance, excavated in the Western Cemetery (with the hesitant permission of the Egyptian Antiquities Service) and neither kept records of his finds nor published them.

=== Italian, German, and American Concessions at Giza ===
In 1902, the Egyptian Antiquities Service under Gaston Maspero resolved to issue permits exclusively to authorized individuals representing public institutions. In November of that year, the Service awarded three scholars with concessions on the Giza Necropolis. They were the Italian Ernesto Schiaparelli from the Turin Museum, the German Georg Steindorff from the University of Leipzig who had funding from Wilhelm Pelizaeus, and the American George Reisner from the Hearst Expedition. Within a matter of months, the site had been divided between the concessionaires following a meeting at the Mena House Hotel involving Schiaparelli, Ludwig Borchardt (Steindorff's representative in Egypt), and Reisner.

=== Division of the West Field ===
By the turn of the 20th century, the three largest pyramids on the Giza plateau were considered mostly exhausted by previous excavations, so the Western Cemetery and its collection of private mastaba tombs were thought to represent the richest unexcavated part of the plateau. George Reisner's wife, Mary, drew names from a hat to assign three long east-west plots of the necropolis among the Italian, German, and American missions. Schiaparelli was assigned the southernmost strip, Borchardt the center, and Reisner the northernmost.

=== Division of the Pyramids ===
Rights to excavate the Pyramids were then also negotiated between Schiaparelli, Borchardt, and Reisner. Schiaparelli gained rights to excavate the Great Pyramid of Khufu along with its three associated queens' pyramids and most of its Eastern Cemetery. Borchardt received Khafre's pyramid, its causeway, the Sphinx, and the Sphinx's associated temples. Reisner claimed Menkaure's pyramid as well as its associated queens' pyramids and pyramid temple, along with a portion of Schiaparelli's Eastern Cemetery. Any future disputes were to be resolved by Inspector James Quibell, as per a letter from Borchardt to Maspero.

=== Immediate aftermath ===
This arrangement lasted until 1905, when, under the supervision of Schiaparelli and Francesco Ballerini, the Italian excavations ceased at Giza. As the Italians were more interested in sites which might yield more papyri, they turned their concession of the southern strip of the Western Cemetery over to the Americans under Reisner.

== Modern usage ==
In 1978, the Grateful Dead played a series of concerts later released as Rocking the Cradle: Egypt 1978. In 2007, Colombian singer Shakira performed at the complex to a crowd of approximately 100,000 people. The complex was used for the final draw of the 2019 Africa Cup of Nations and the 2021 World Men's Handball Championship.

Egypt's Minister of Tourism unveiled plans for a €17,000,000 revamp of the complex by the end of 2021, in order to boost tourism in Egypt as well as make the site more accessible and tourist-friendly. According to Lonely Planet, the refurbishment includes a new visitors' centre, an environmentally-friendly electric bus, a restaurant (the 9 Pyramids Lounge), as well as a cinema, public toilets, site-wide signage, food trucks, photo booths, and free Wi-Fi. The new facility is part of a wider plan to renovate the 4,500 year old site.

== See also ==
- Egyptian pyramids
- List of Egyptian pyramids
- List of largest monoliths, includes section on calculating weight of megaliths
- Outline of Egypt
- Teotihuacan
