= Tomb of Meresankh III =

Ancient Egyptian tomb at Giza

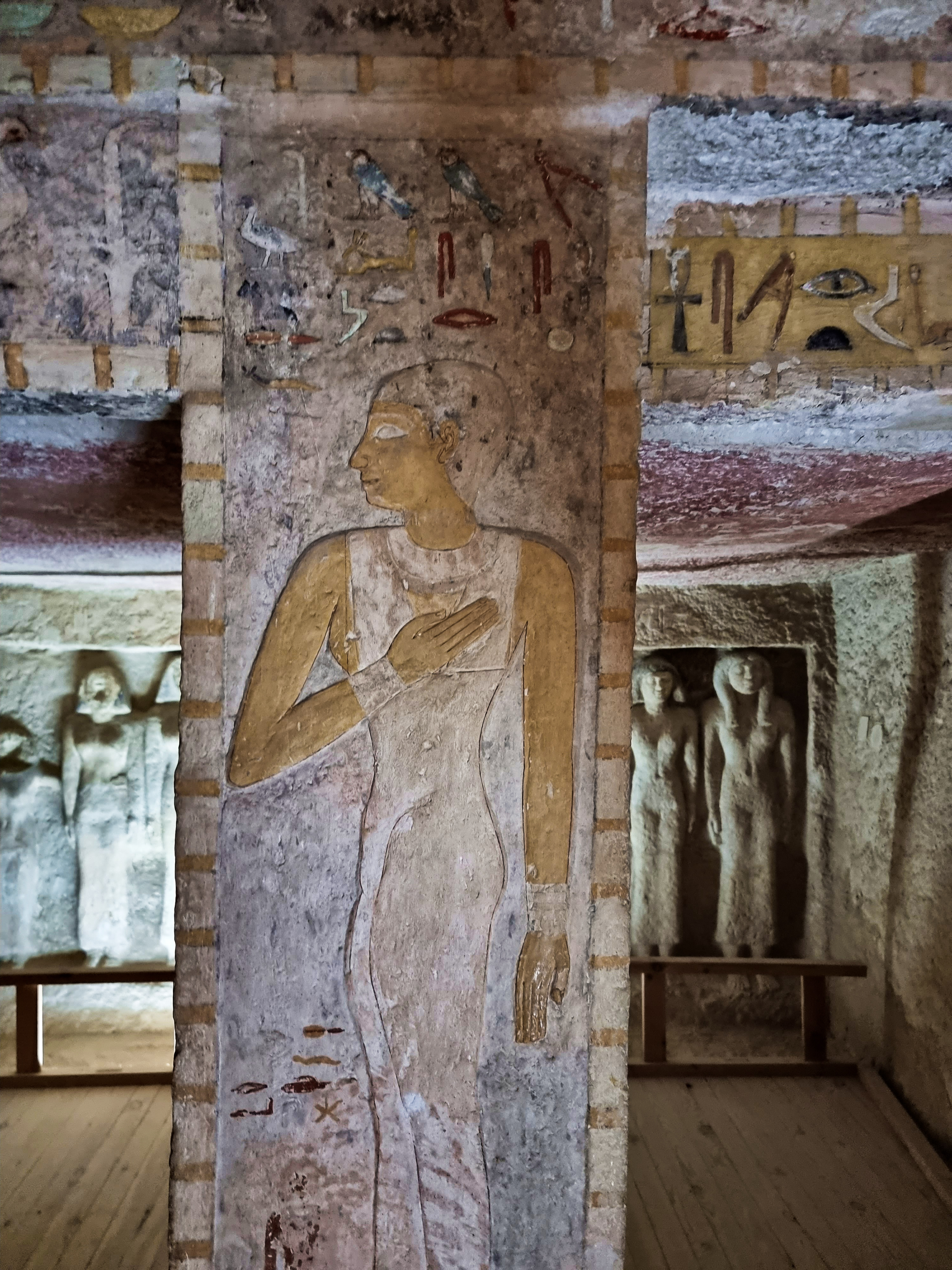
- Decoration inside the chapel of the tomb Burial site of Meresankh III
- Type: Tomb
- Location: Giza, Egypt

History
- Built: c. 2520 BC

Site notes
- Discovered: 1927

The Tomb of Meresankh III is an ancient Egyptian tomb in the Eastern Cemetery of the Giza Necropolis. It housed the burial of Meresankh III, queen and wife to Khafre, though it was most likely commissioned by her mother, Hetepheres II. The subterranean rock-cut tomb, designated by archeologists as "G7530 sub" and is located under a mastaba designated G7530/7540. The tomb consists of a three-room chapel, decorated with painted reliefs and carved figures, and a deeper burial chamber where Meresankh's sarcophagus was found.

== Construction ==
Meresankh III was the wife of Khafre. Her parents were Hetepheres II, daughter of Khufu, and Kawab, son of Khufu and half-brother to Hetepheres II. Her tomb is located in the Eastern Cemetery that stretches next to the Great Pyramid of Khufu. This area was designated to accommodate the tombs of his family, including queens and his children. It returned to use during Khafre's reign. One of the first mastabas built at this time (G7530/7540) became the superstructure over the tomb of Meresankh III. The mastaba was assigned to Hetepheres II and she is likely responsible for building the tomb below this for her daughter, who likely died before her. Evidence for this is found on the sarcophagus, on which an inscription added to the original decoration indicates that Hetepheres II gave it to Meresankh. An inscription on a doorway in the tomb records that Meresankh was buried here 272 days after her death, a long delay that could suggest her death was unexpected and that more time was needed to prepare the tomb. The tomb is thus usually attributed to the late Fourth Dynasty period. Work on the tomb probably occurred or continued during the reign of Menkaure, Khafre's successor.

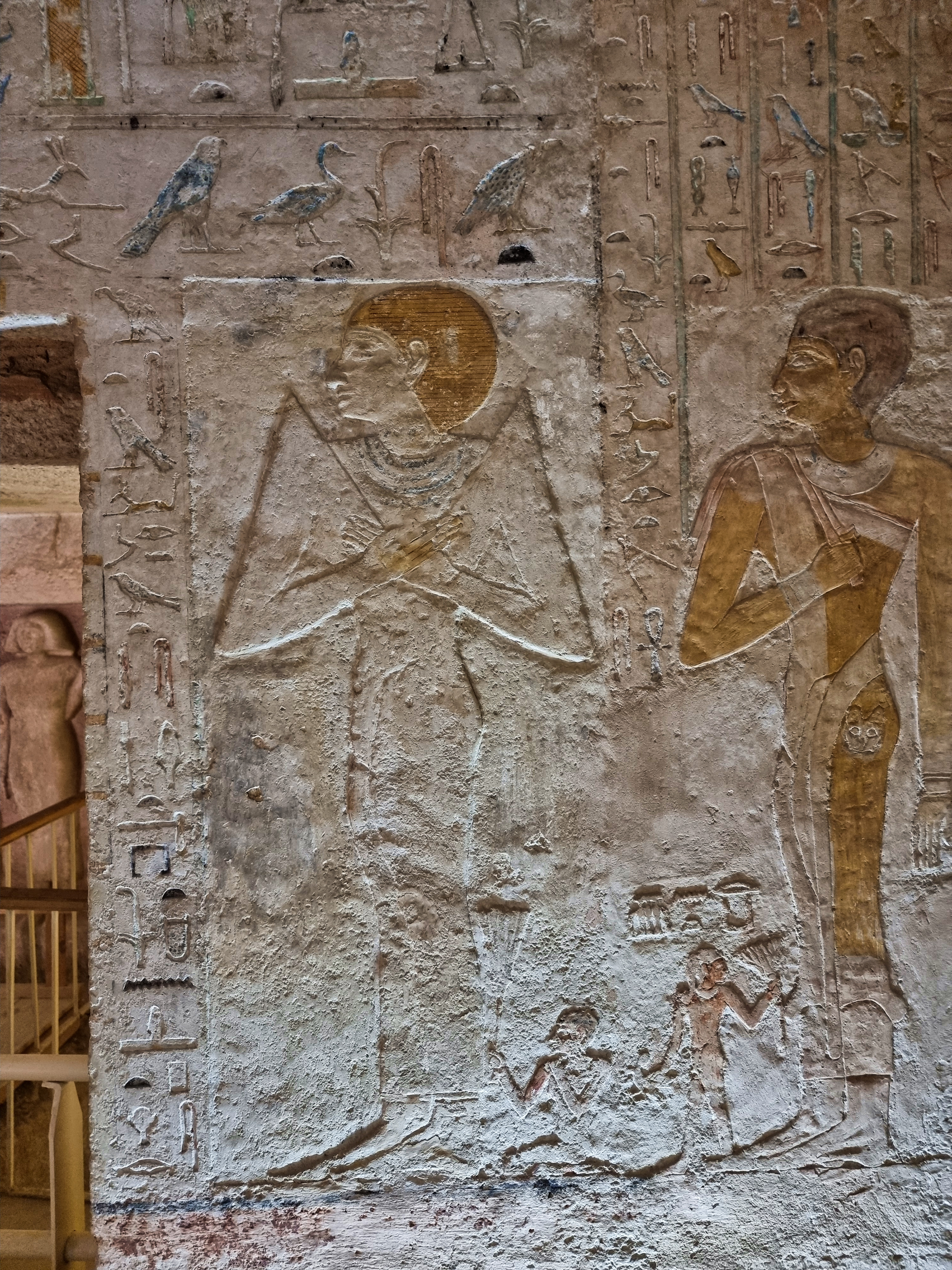
Depiction of Hetepheres II (left) and Meresankh III (right) on the north wall of the first room

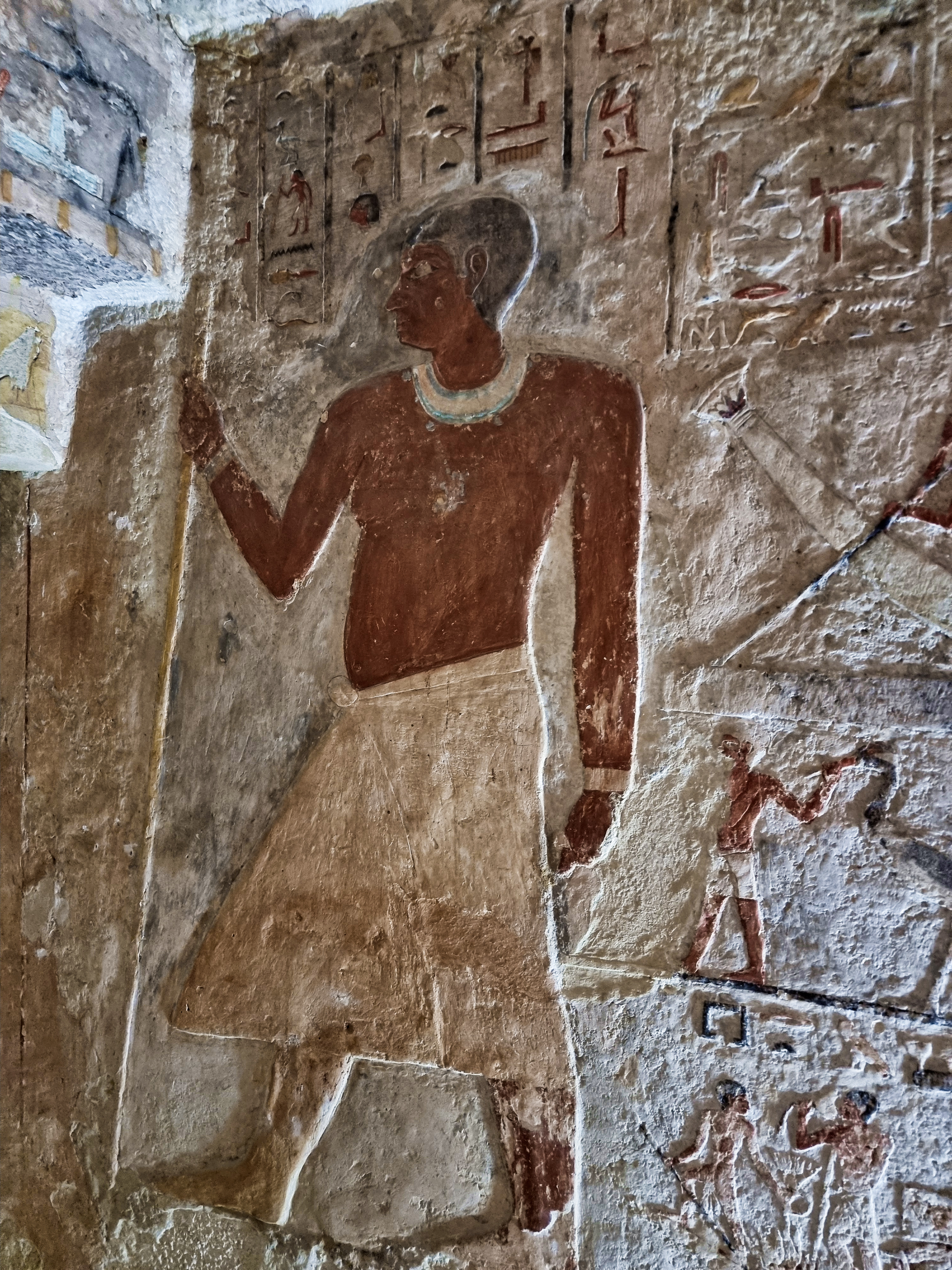
Depiction of Kawab on the east wall of the first room

== Discovery ==
The tomb was uncovered in 1927 during what was intended to be last day of excavations by a team from Harvard University and the Museum of Fine Arts in Boston, led by George Reisner. Excavators were clearing debris from the G 7540 mastaba and discovered the entrance to the tomb. When the team entered the burial chamber, they found the lid of the sarcophagus propped open with rocks, left this way by robbers long ago, and the discarded skeleton of Queen Meresankh III left in a corner of the room.

== Architecture ==
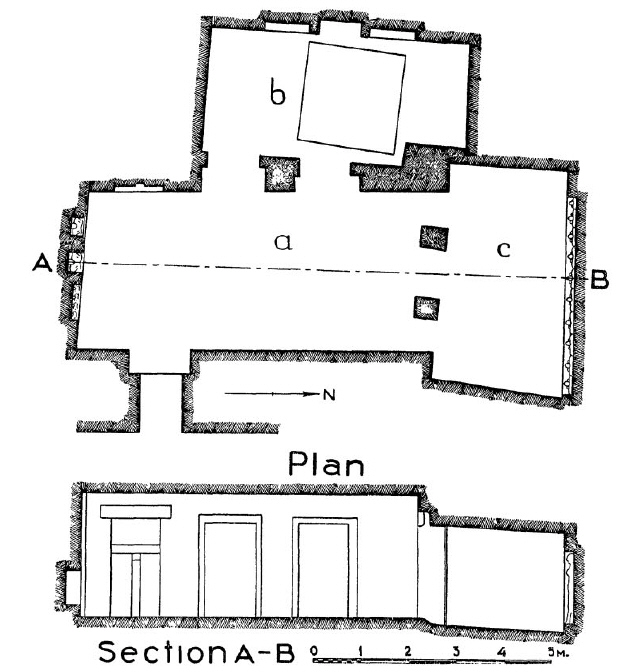
Plan of the tomb's chapel, divided into three rooms (a-c)

The mastaba at ground level includes a small chapel for offerings, consisting of a room with a cruciform layout entered from the east. It was decorated with reliefs, of which the best remains are now found on the north wall, where four women are depicted making offerings. The rock-cut tomb is located about 2 metres (6.6 ft) below the level of the street. It consists of a chapel divided into three rooms, plus a shaft leading to the burial below. The tomb is decorated with painted reliefs that include depictions of Meresankh and her family (including Hetepheres II), scenes of funerary preparations, and agricultural scenes. One of the most unusual features is the north wall, which is carved with ten female figures in a row. The west wall includes a false door.

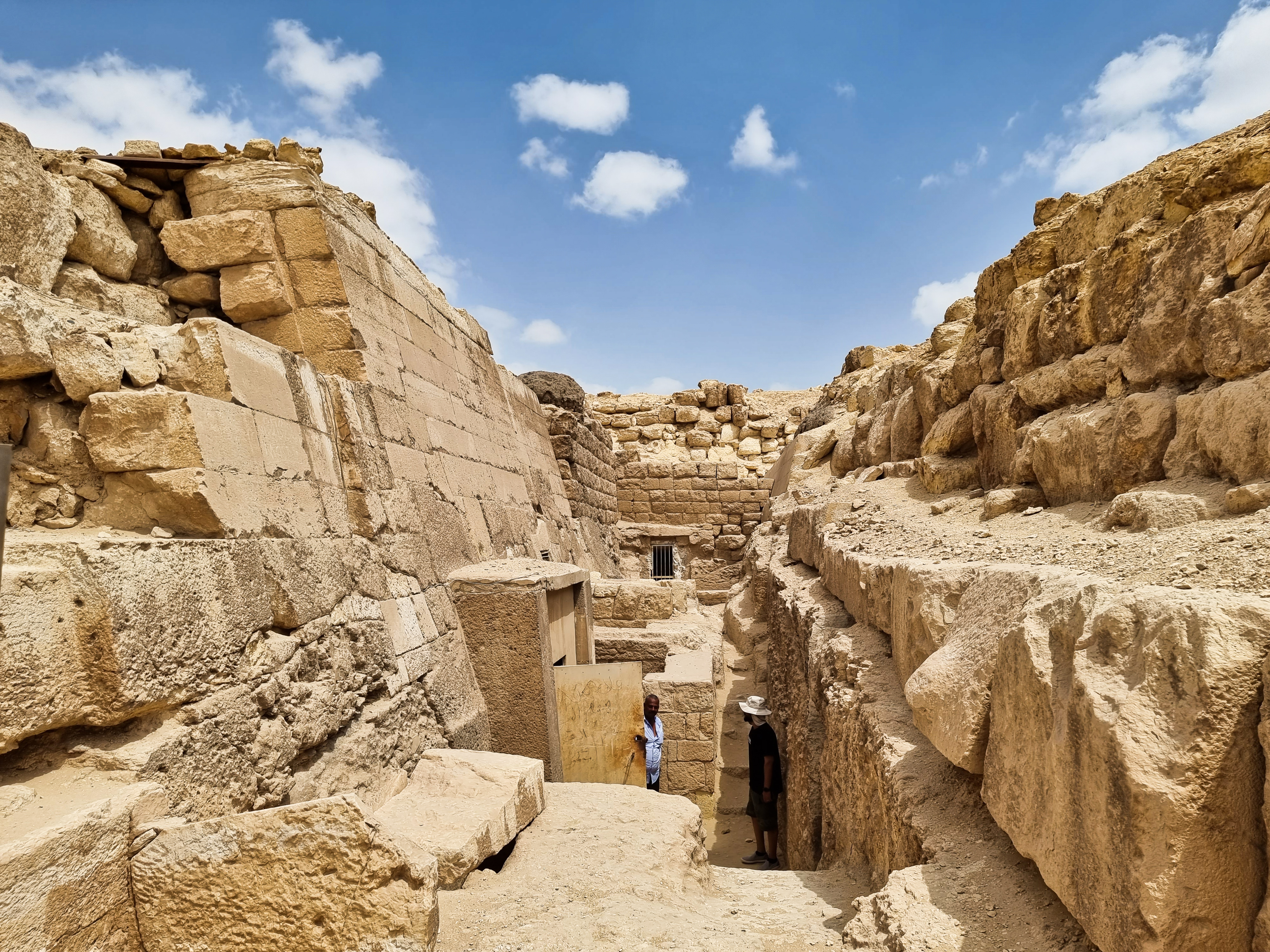
The mastaba and entrance to the tomb (left)

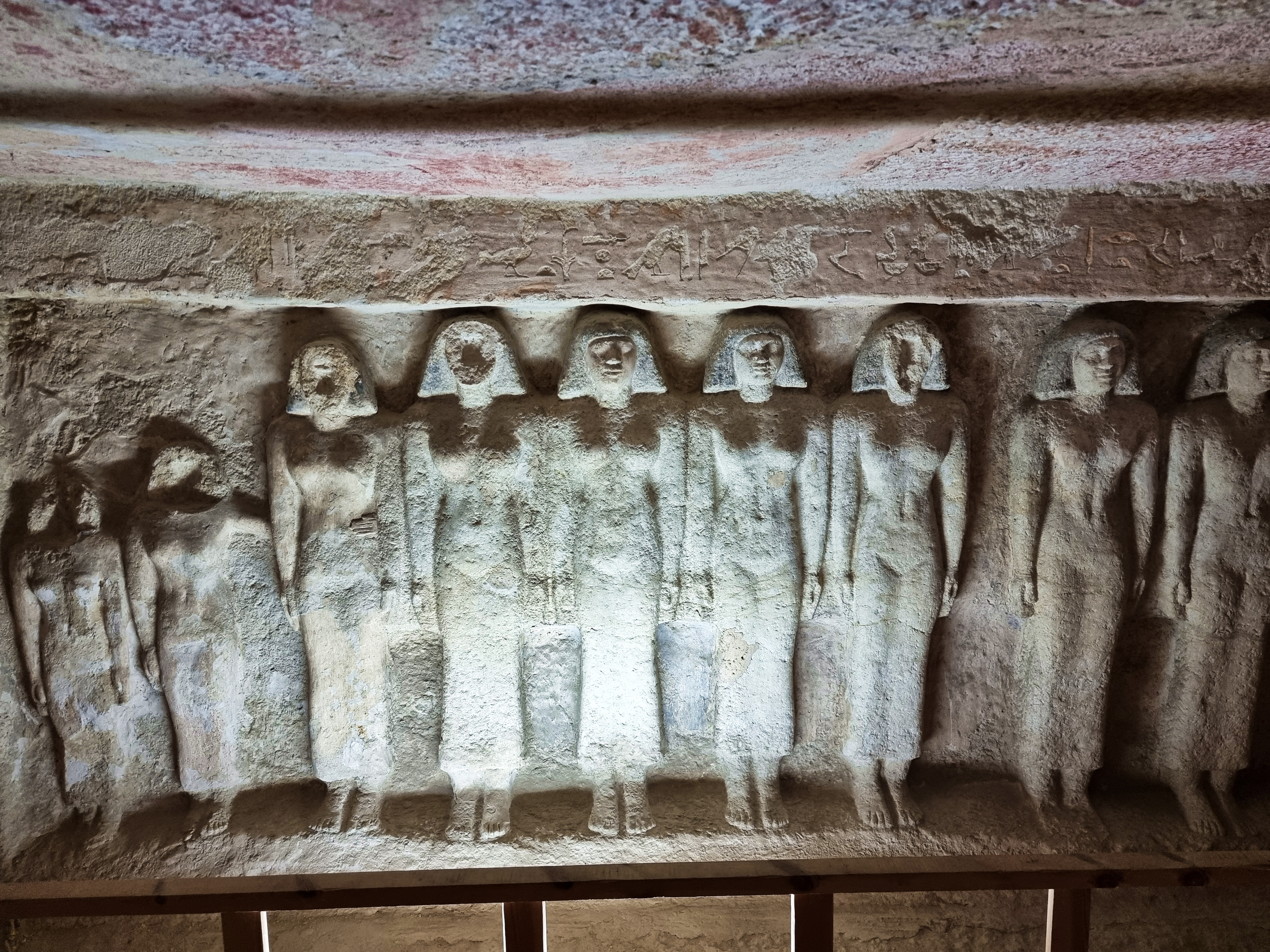
Row of sculpted figures on the north wall

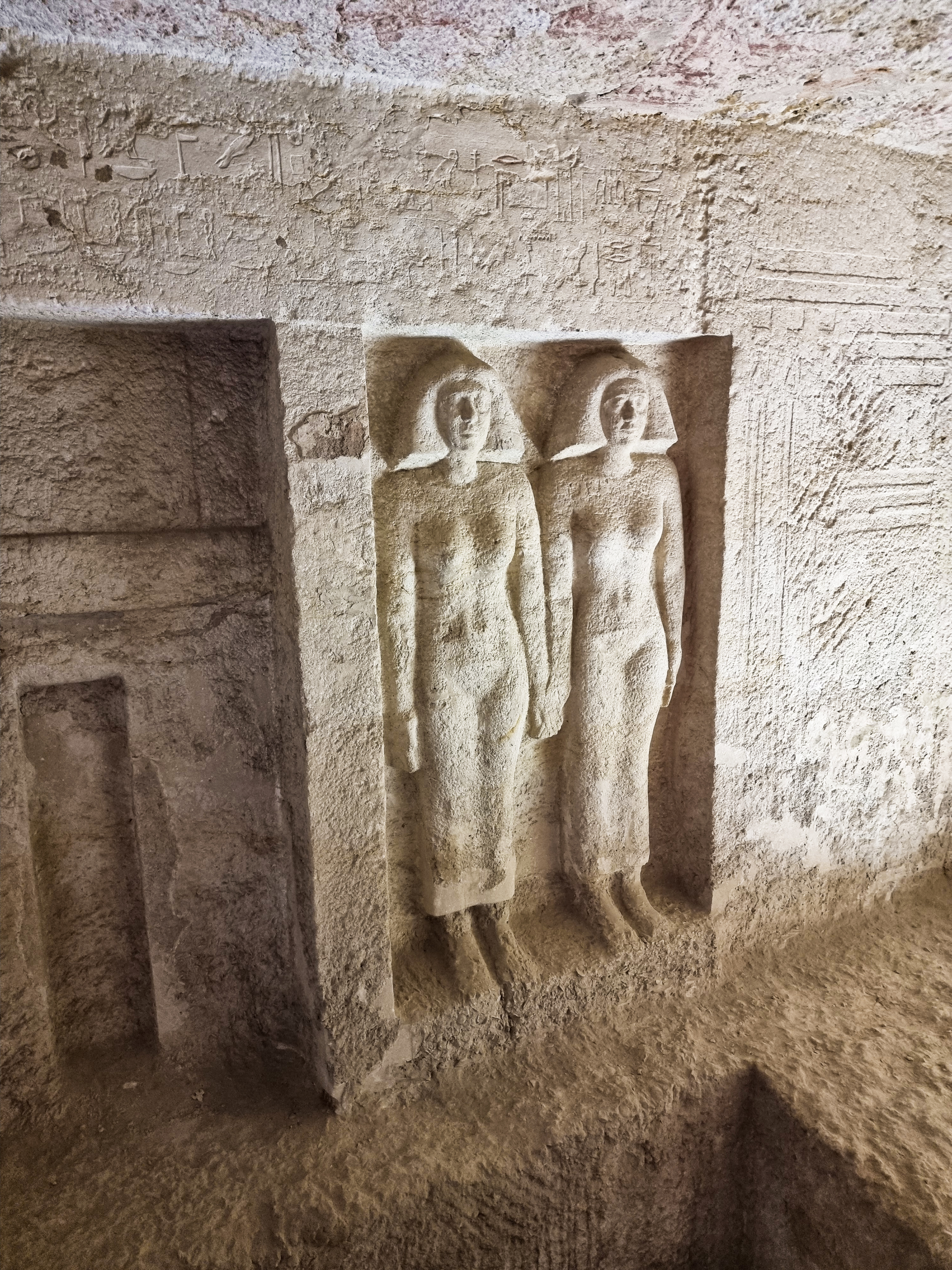
Sculpted figures (right) and false door (left) on the west wall

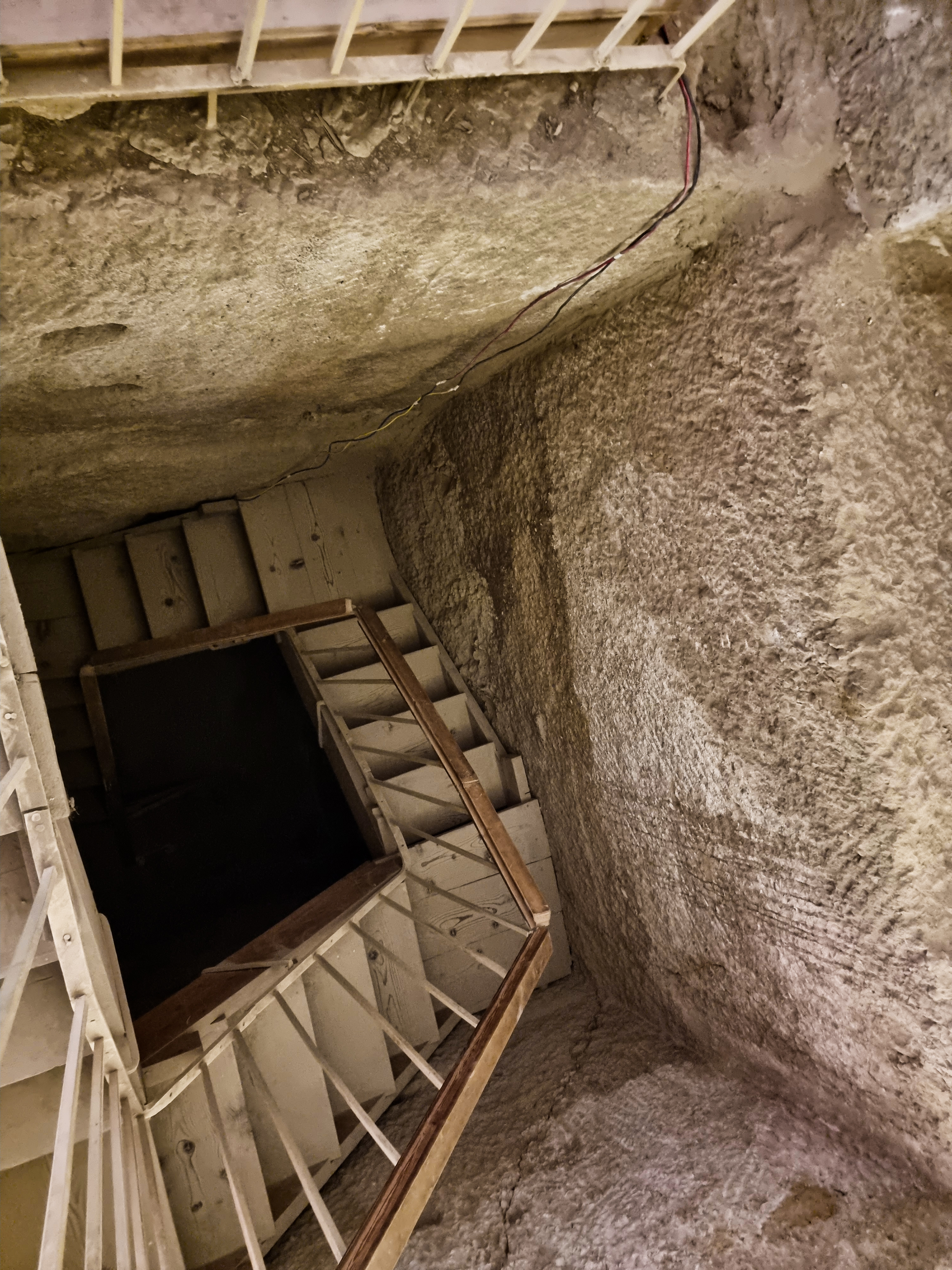
Shaft leading to the burial

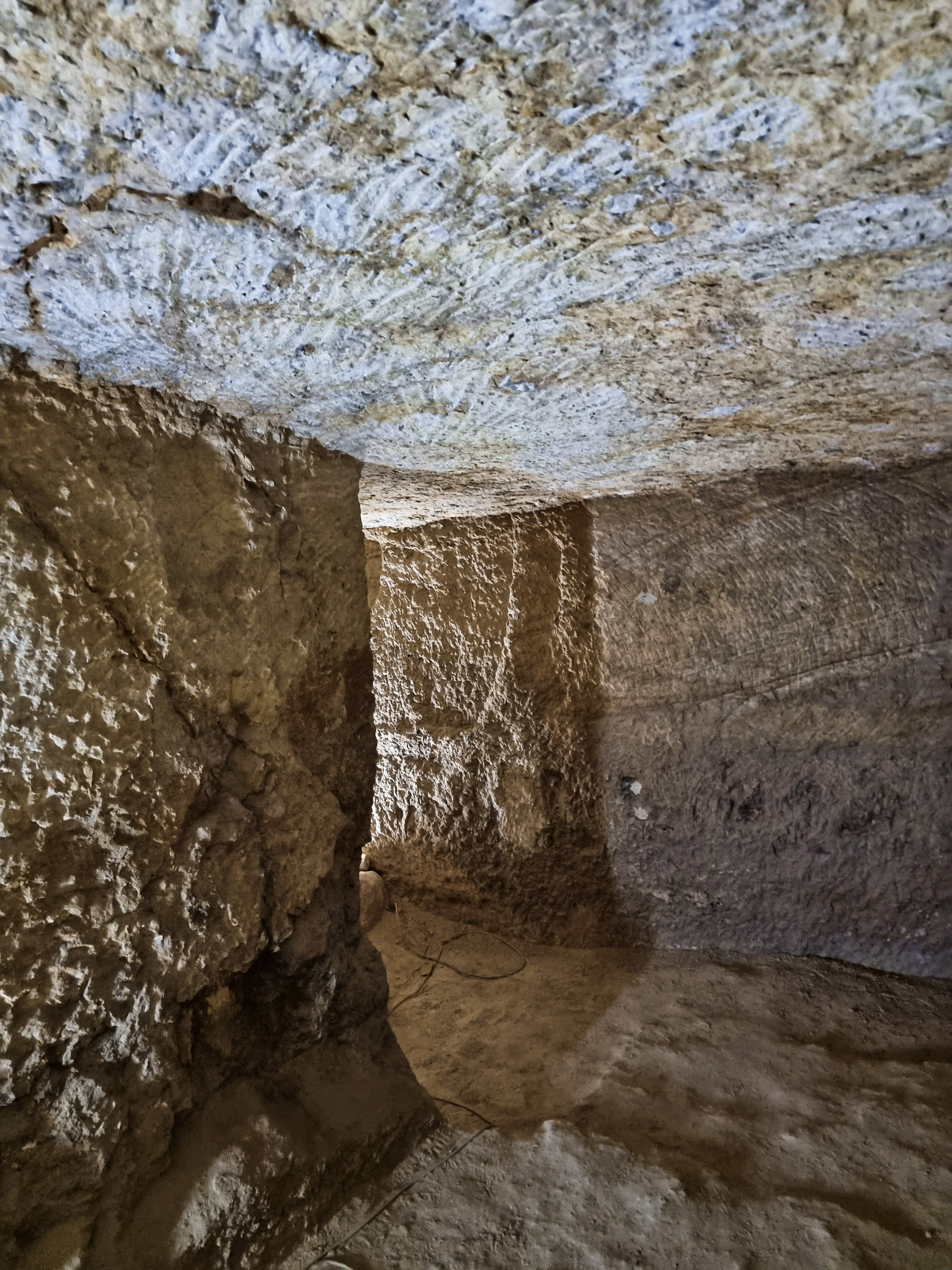
Burial chamber (looking towards the entrance)
