= Duaenhor =

- Prince of Egypt
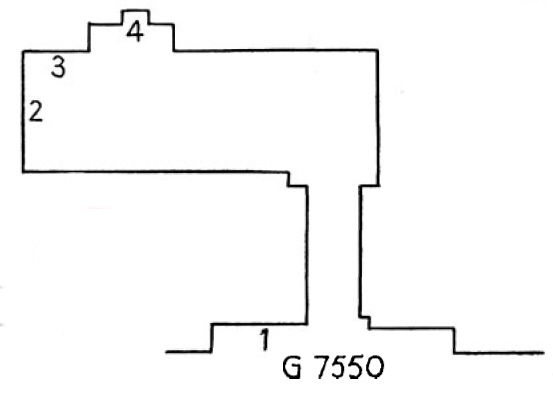
- Plan of Duaenhor's tomb in Giza
- Burial: mastaba G 7550, Giza
- Issue: Nebtyhotep
- Religion: Ancient Egyptian religion

Duaenhor (fl. c. 2550 BC) was a Prince of Egypt. He was named after the god Horus.

== Family ==
Duaenhor is thought by some to be a son of Crown Prince Kawab and Queen consort Hetepheres II. If so, he would have been a grandson of Pharaoh Khufu and Queen Meritites I. On the other hand, based on his titles, he may be one of the younger sons of Khufu (along with Kaemsekhem (G 7660), and Mindjedef (G 7760)).

Duaenhor's brothers were Kaemsekhem and Mindjedef. A daughter of Duaenhor was named Nebtyhotep.

He held the titles King’s son of his body and Companion of his father.

== Tomb ==
Duaenhor was buried at Giza in mastaba G 7550. In the tomb, his father and mother are mentioned. His daughter Nebtyhotep is also mentioned on the south entrance facade.

The scenes in the tomb show:

- (1) Duaenhor and his family
- (2) Table scene
- (3) Butchers at work
- (4) False door of Duaenhor
