= Heit el-Ghurab (City of the Pyramid Builders) =

Heit el-Ghurab, City of Pyramid Builders, Wall of the Crow
- Location within Egypt
- 29°58′16″N 31°08′26″E
- Location: Giza, Cairo Governorate, Egypt

History
- Built: Old Kingdom, 4th-6th dynasties

Heit el-Ghurab (Arabic for 'Wall of the Crow' aka Lost City of the Pyramid Builders) is a site where the workers who built the Old Kingdom Pyramids of Giza lived. It is a UNESCO World Heritage site protected under the UNESCO designation Memphis and its Necropolis - the Pyramid Fields from Giza to Dahshur inscribed in 1979. The 4,500 year old archaeological settlement is separated from the area of the pyramids by a stone wall, 200m long, 10m high and 10m wide, with a 7m high gate through the center, the Bab el-reisi (which is known as the King's Gate in the Wall of the Crow). A monumental tunnel-like entrance links the exterior desert to the inner complex into the ancient settlement. The site was a state-engineered logistics hub to sustain permanent and temporary workers as well as overseers constructing the 4th Dynasty Pyramids The settlement continued to be used during the 5th and 6th Dynasties.

== Site description ==
Heit el-Ghurab is an extensive Ancient Egyptian settlement located on the southeastern edge of the Giza Plateau, approximately 400 meters south of the Great Sphinx. The settlement dates to the 4th Dynasty (Old Kingdom, 2613-2494 BCE) and continued to be used through the 6th Dynasty. The massive construction site served as administrative, living quarters for workers and skilled specialists, food preparation stations for Pharaohs Khafre and Menkaure. According to Ancient Egypt Research Associates (AERA), “the 4th Dynasty settlement we discovered here proved to be an urban settlement that sprawled across more than 7 hectares (over 17 acres)”.

Continual excavations by AERA archaeologists, led by Mark Lehner have uncovered:

- A massive Megalithic gateway built into the stone wall (200m long, 10m high and 10m thick at the base.
- Paved ancient roadways
- Specialized industrial zones
- Structured neighborhoods including the Galleries (barrack-like structures that housed workers/overseers)
- The western town featuring larger houses for high ranking administrators/managers.
- Flood defense and boundary evidence. The Wall functioned as both a major territorial/sacred boundary marker and as a protective barrier against flash floods coming down from the nearby Wadi.
- Burial demographics by AERA have shown that these burials were poor and consisted of child burials.

== Wall of the Crow ==
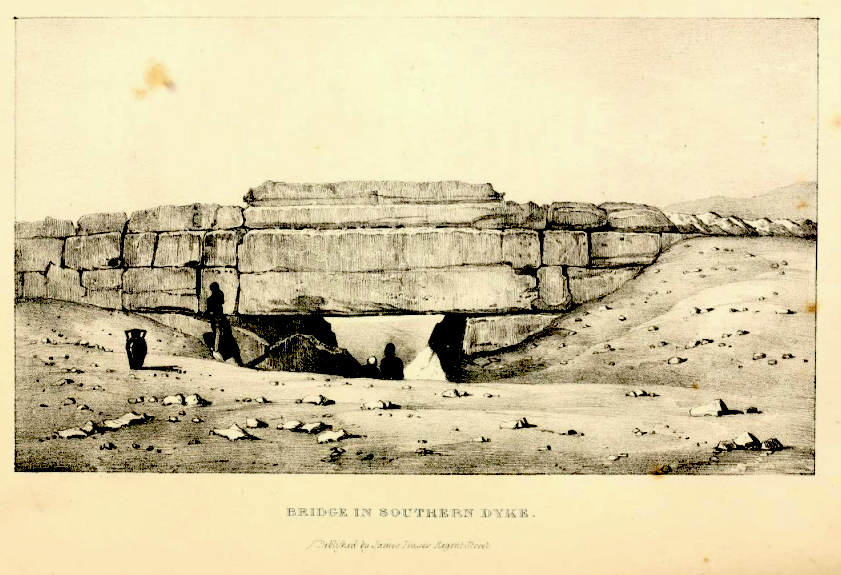
Wall of the Crow 1837

The Wall of the Crow separates the settlement from the pyramid field, thereby separating the sacred from the profane. The wall gets its name from a massive limestone boundary wall marking its northwest border. Dimensions: 200 meters long, 10 meters high and 10 meters thick at the base. During the Late Period dating 747-525BCe, Egyptians returned to the Wall of the Crow as a sacred space and converted it into a dense cemetery. During the Ptolemaic and Roman eras, this sacred burial site was used continuously for the non-elite population.

=== Function ===
- Built in order to control movement in and out of the area
- To protect the site from periodic flash floods;
- Symbolic as a demarcation of the sacred pyramid-temple site from the secular production zone.

== Great Gateway ==
Over 4,500 year old Great Gateway is an ancient historical landmark. It is one of the largest surviving gateways from the ancient world, a multi-ton lintel stone. According to AERA, the 300-ton lintel stone was certainly ceremonial and symbolic. The Great Gateway features an ancient roadway navigating under the lintel. The sides slope down which is a common feature of ancient roadways. During funeral processions, the deceased and their entourage would enter through this Great Gateway to their final resting place.

== Excavations ==
Aerial View of Heit el-Ghurab 2024

Since 1988, Mark Lehner and the Ancient Egypt Research Associates (AERA) have continually excavated the site and have broken the myth that the pyramids were built by slaves (or aliens for that matter) but built by a well-organized state workforce properly fed and well taken care of.

Egyptian Archeologist, Zahi Hawass played a central role in locating and excavating cemeteries connected with the City of the Pyramid Builders. Dr. Hawass emphasizes that Heit el-Ghurab was built by organized, skilled human labor but with specialized teams of artisans, overseers and laborers.

== Eastern town ==
Features smaller, mud-brick housing with less formal layouts and used as permanent residences. It was a year-round community with mixed use: domestic, craft and administration. An Eastern Town Home (ETH) is a small village house in typical Old Kingdom "snail shell" form. The outer areas contain spaces for working food production and storage. The Inner Area was more personal space with a bed platform in the innermost room. The house represents the only traditional Egyptian village house AERA has excavated within the entire Heir el-Ghurab settlement.

== Western town ==
It was a royally planned urban center that served as a base of operations for building the pyramids of Khafre and Menkaure. The Western Town is larger, and included uniformed barracks and communal accommodations for the rotating labor-force. It shows military and labor-focused and labor-related features.

== Old Kingdom corral at Giza ==
Richard Redding of AERA proposed that this corral functioned as a stockyard where live cattle brought from the provinces across Egypt were kept before slaughter. This allowed central authorities to manage and supply livestock to feed the laborers and administrators building the Giza pyramids.

== Royal administrative building ==
The Royal Administrative Building was a large, bureaucratic center for the site. It contained massive grain silos and served as a direct link to state authority and grain resource distribution. Extensive numbers of seal impressions used for closing bags, boxes, and jars attest to the administrative goods that entered and exited this area. Specialized workshops dedicated to weaving, alabaster working and copper manufacturing were present here also.

== Galleries ==
Are long narrow, stone-lined rooms that form part of the Gallery Complex at the east end of the Wall. Archaeological work by AERA has shown that these galleries were functional living and working spaces. These barracks housed up to 40 temporary workers (a standard Old Kingdom "zah" or work crew) per gallery.

== Bakeries ==
To the east of the galleries are a series of industrialized bakeries. These are essential dozens of household size kitchens set next to one another to make large quantities of food. Numerous grain graining querns are found in and around the bakeries as well as in the Eastern Town where some of the bakers may have lived.

== Workers' diets ==
The state heavily subsidized the workforce. Excavations revealed animal bones and a massive cattle corral. Estimations of 4,000 pounds of prime meat (cattle, sheep and goats) were slaughtered daily to feed a rotating workforce of 10,000 workers. High protein diets were used as a state incentive. Feeding the workers this high protein diet was a religious and civic duty. The Pharaoh acted as the “divine cosmic intermediary”. Caring for the workforce was part of maintaining Ma’at (universal truth, balance and order).

== Workers cemeteries ==
Late 1980 and 1990s, skeletal remains and small tombs evidenced that the workers’ bore the physical wear and tear of heavy construction. Excavations led by AERA have analyzed the skeletal remains found in the cemeteries adjacent to the workers’ town.

Evidence showed high-quality medical care, expert fracture repair, bone setting and advanced surgeries. Skeletons showed well-set fractures (long bones like arms and legs). The bones were aligned properly and stabilized using wooden splints and linen wrappings resulting in clean healings with minimal complications.

Advanced surgeries: There is clear evidence of successful limb amputations where bone had completely healed afterward, demonstrating that the workers had access to highly skilled medical practitioners and specialized medical care.

== Osteoarcheology ==
The bones serve as a biological archive of the immense physical labor required to construct the pyramids. A large proportion of both male and female skeletons exhibit severe degenerative joint disease, the wear and tear concentrated heavily in the spine, knees and ankles directly correlating with the continuous lifting and dragging of massive stone blocks.

The areas where muscles attach to the bone (entheses) are highly pronounced on these skeletons. This reveals repetitive, heavy strain on the shoulders, forearms and lower back from pushing, pulling and stone-quarrying activities.

== Future goals ==
According to AERA, “the long term goal is to establish the Heit el-Ghurab Archaeology Preserve as a permanent research and training ground for Egyptian archaeologists”. In addition," the Heit el-Ghurab site allows training in settlement achaeology, which requires the most meticulous stratigraphic excavation. With permissions, we could practice survey, epigraphy, and architectural recording on nearby tombs and temples".
