= Mindjedef =

R23 Dd f
- Prince of Egypt
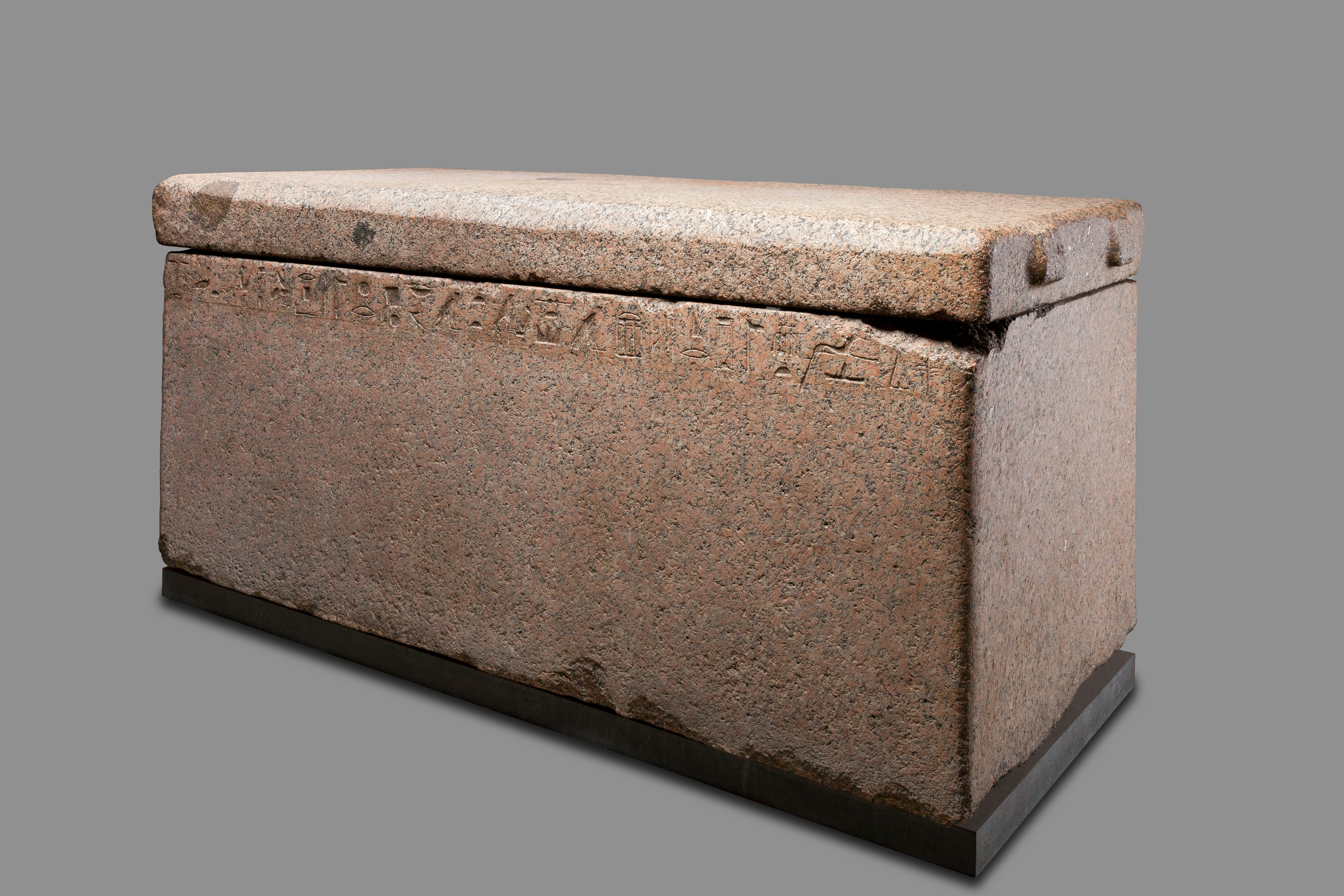
- Sarcophagus of Mindjedef
- Born: c. 2570 BC
- Burial: mastaba G 7760, Giza
- Spouse: Khufuankh
- Father: Kawab
- Mother: Hetepheres II
- Religion: Ancient Egyptian religion

Mindjedef (born c. 2570 BC) was a Prince of ancient Egypt, who lived during the 4th Dynasty. His name means "Enduring Like Min". Min is an Egyptian fertility god.

== Family ==
Mindjedef was a son of Crown Prince Kawab and Queen consort Hetepheres II. He was the grandson of King Khufu and Meritites I and great-grandson of Sneferu. Mindjedef was born during the reign of his grandfather. Mindjedef was a brother of Queen Meresankh III and uncle of Rawer and Minkhaf II.

It is known that Mindjedef had a wife called Khufuankh ("Khufu lives").

== Titles ==
Prince Mindjedef held the titles King’s son of his body, Hereditary prince, Treasurer of the King of Lower Egypt, etc.

== Burial ==
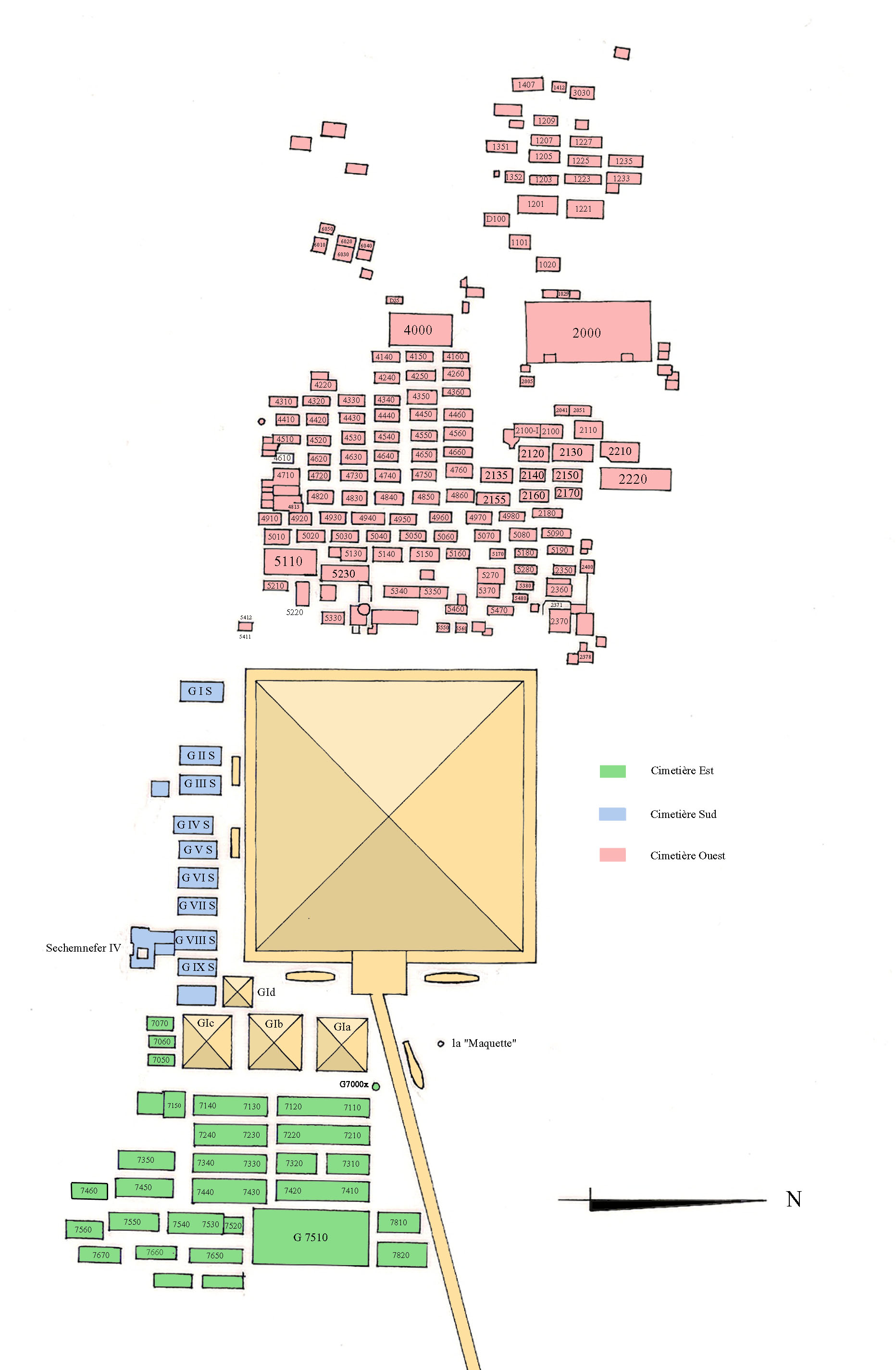
Tomb of Mindjedef is located near the east side(depicted in green) compared to the Great Pyramid of Giza as shown in the centre of the picture.

Mindjedef was buried at Giza in mastaba G 7760. Mindjedef and Khufuankh are depicted with a small son in the chapel, but his name is not preserved. His sarcophagus is now at the Metropolitan Museum of Art (acc. no. 54.80a-b).

== Ancestry ==
Ancestors of Mindjedef

Khufu
Kawab
Sneferu
Meritites I
Mindjedef
Khufu
Hetepheres II
