= Kawab =

Egyptian prince

- Vizier of Egypt
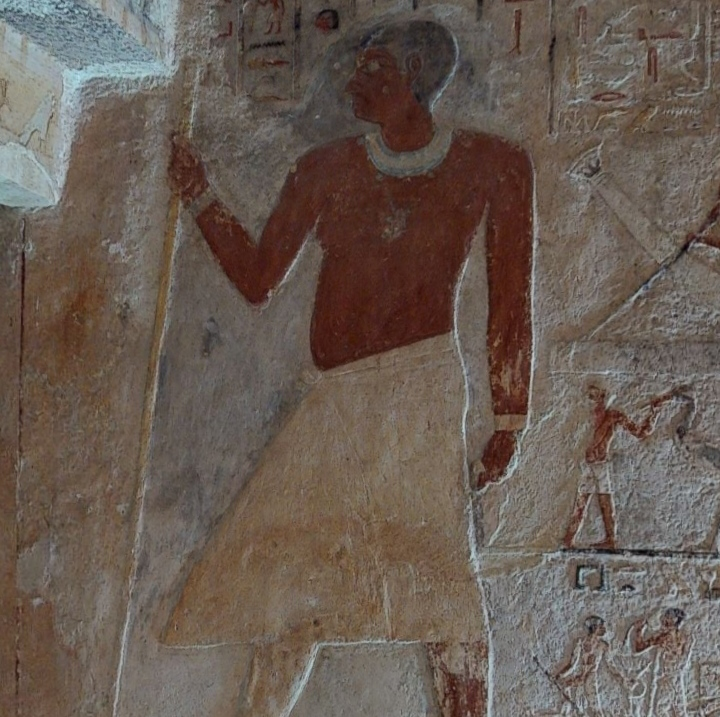
- A relief of Prince Kawab at tomb of queen Meresankh III
Egyptian name
t G38 M23 A20 n X t f D28 A6 bHereredity Prince eldest king's son
- Tenure: c. 2570 BC
- Pharaoh: Khufu
- Born: c. 2600 BC
- Died: c. 2570 BC (aged c. 30)
- Burial: Mastaba G 7110–7120 at Giza
- Spouse: Hetepheres II
- Father: Khufu
- Mother: Meritites I
- Children: Mindjedef; Meresankh III

Kawab (c. 2600 BC - c. 2570 BC) was an ancient Egyptian prince of the 4th Dynasty. He was the eldest son of King Khufu and Queen Meritites I. Kawab served as vizier and was buried in the double mastaba G 7110–7120 in the east field which is part of the Giza Necropolis.

== Biography ==
Kawab was the eldest son of King Khufu and Meritites I and half-brother of kings Djedefre and Khafre. He was possibly born during the reign of his grandfather Sneferu. Kawab married his sister Hetepheres II. They had at least one son, named Mindjedef, and a daughter named Meresankh III. Duaenhor is thought by some to be a son and Kaemsekhem probably is one as well.

Kawab died during the reign of his father so the next ruler was Djedefre, who married his widow Hetepheres II. It used to be believed that Djedefre had Kawab murdered, since Djedefre was buried in Abu Rawash, instead of Giza, which was the custom. Djedefre's pyramid was also vandalized, but it is now thought that the tomb was vandalized much later, that is, during Roman times.

Kawab's titles included officiant of Anubis, Priest of Serket, King's son of his body, King's eldest son of his body, hereditary prince, chief of the ten(s) of Upper Egypt, sole companion of love, vizier (the title of vizier occurs on a statue from Mitrahina).

== Titles ==
The full list of titles of Kawab were:

| Title | Translation | Jones Index |
|---|---|---|
| imy iz | he who is in the iz-bureau, councillor | 247 |
| iry-pˁt | hereditary prince/nobleman, 'keeper of the patricians' | 1157 |
| ˁȝ dwȝw | assistant of Duau | 1308 |
| wr di.w pr ḏḥwty | Greatest of the Five in the temple of Thoth | 1471 |
| ḥȝty-ˁ | count | 1858 |
| ḥm-nṯr srḳt | priest of Serket | 2120 |
| ḥts(?) Inpw ... | Reading unknown but related to Anubis (Inpw) | 2501 |
| ḫrp iȝwt nbwt nṯrwt | director of every divine office | 2541 |
| ẖry-ḥbt ḥry-tp | chief lector priest, lector priest in charge | 2860 |
| zȝ nswt | king's son | 2911 |
| zȝ nswt n ẖt.f | King's son of his body | 2912 |
| zȝ nswt smsw | king's eldest son | 2913 |
| zȝ nswt n ẖt.f smsw | king's eldest son of his body | 2914 |
| smr wˁty n(y) mrwt | sole companion, possessor of love | 3277 |
| tȝyty zȝb ṯȝty | he of the curtain, chief justice and vizier | 3706 |
| wr 10 šmˁ | Greatest/Great one of the ten of Upper Egypt | 1437 |

Translations and indexes from Dilwyn Jones.

== Tomb ==
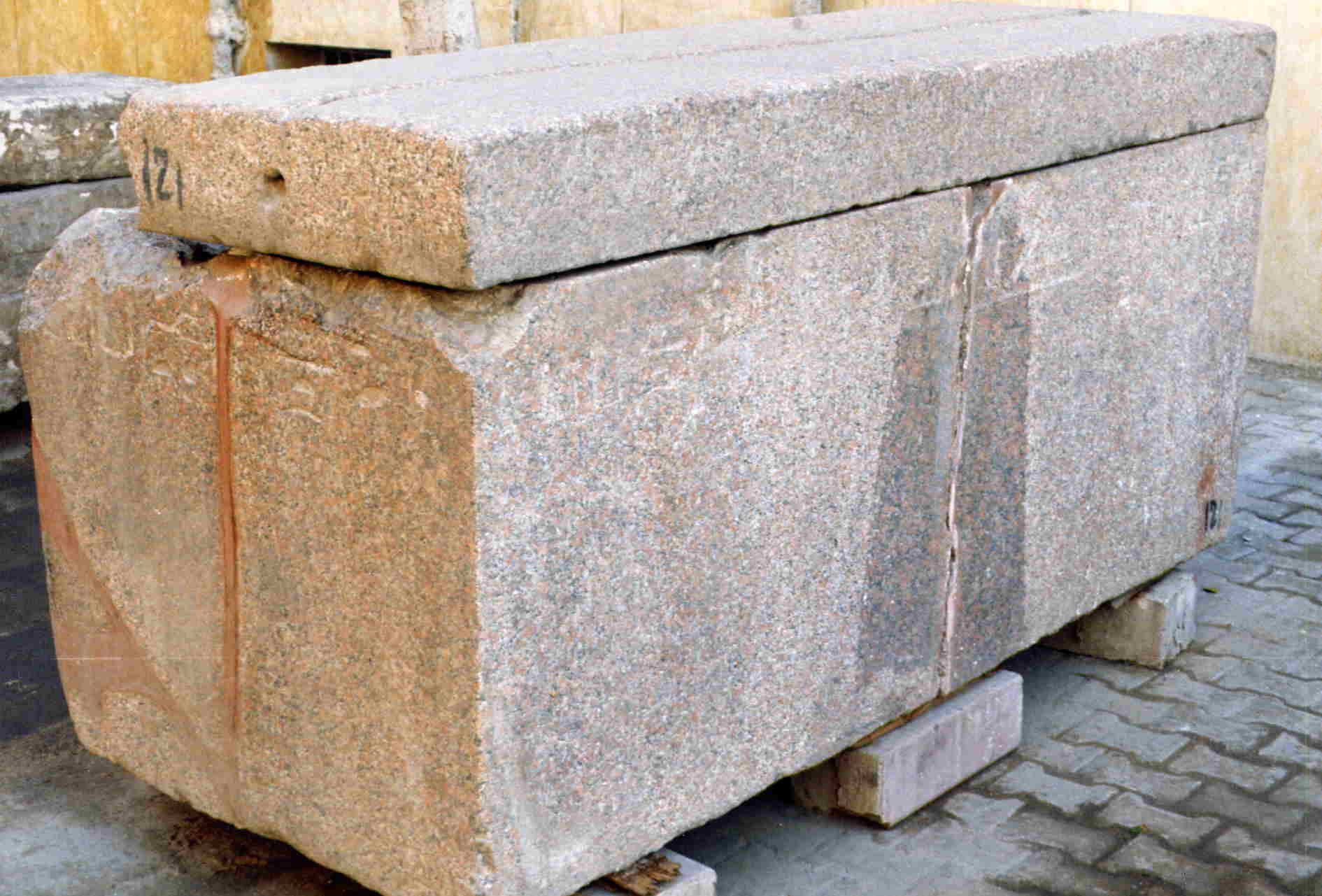
Prince Kawab's sarcophagus

Kawab was buried in a large double mastaba G 7110–7120 in the east field which is part of the Giza Necropolis. Mastaba G 7110 belonged to Kawab's wife. Her name was found in the chapel. G 7120 belonged to Kawab. A relief in the door way shows Kawab standing before his mother:

zȝ.s mr.s kȝ-wˤb, zȝt nṯr.s ḫrp jmȝt sšmt mrt-jt.s mwt.f mst n ḫwfw "Her son, her beloved, Ka-wab, the daughter of her god, she who is in charge of the affairs of the jmAt, Meritites, his mother, who bore (him) to Khufu."

Four burial shafts were constructed as part of the mastaba. Shaft G 7110A was never used. Shaft G 7110B was originally intended for Hetepheres II, but was never finished and shows no sign of ever being used. This is most likely due to the fact that Hetepheres remarried after the death of her husband. Shaft G 7120A was the burial place of Kawab. A red granite sarcophagus was made for Kawab and found in place. The sarcophagus is inscribed with the following text:

1) "A boon which the king gives and Anubis, foremost of the divine booth, a burial in the necropolis as a possessor of a well provided state before the great god, officiant of Anubis, priest of Selket, Kawab

2) a boon which the king gives and Anubis, foremost of the divine booth, a burial in the necropolis in the western cemetery, having grown gracefully old, the king's son of his body, Kawab

3) king's eldest son of his body, officiant of Anubis, Kawab."

== After death ==
Over a millennia after Kawab died, Prince Khaemweset, son of Ramesses II, restored Kawab's statue in the temple of Memphis.

== In popular culture ==
The 1988 PBS tv film adaptation of David Macaulay's 1975 book Pyramid depicts Kawab as being killed by an ambush near the border between Egypt and Nubia.

== Ancestry ==
Ancestors of Kawab

Khufu
Kawab
Sneferu
Meresankh I
Meritites I
