= Hetepheres II =

Htp t p Hr r s
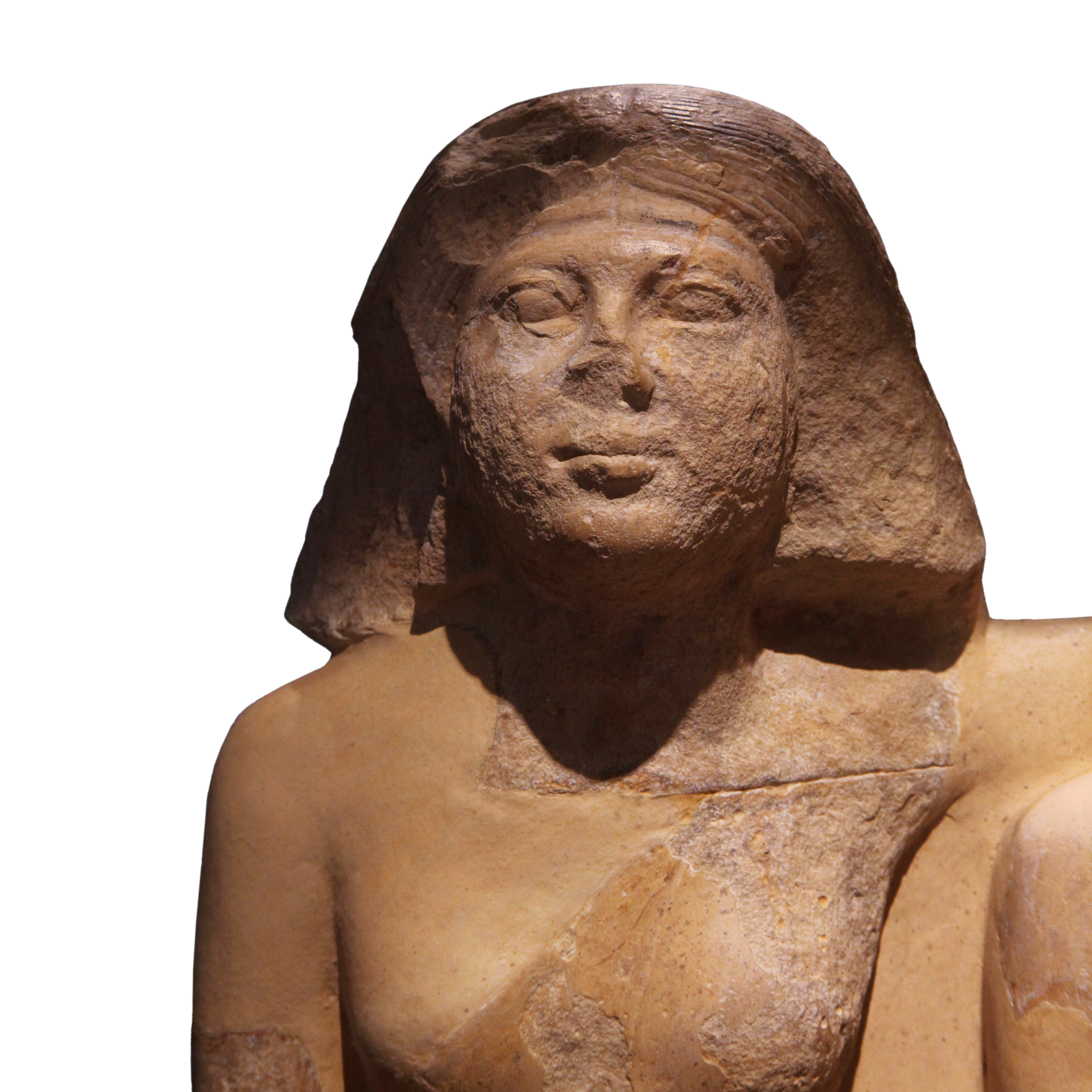

Queen consort of Egypt
- Tenure: c. 2560 BC
- Born: c. 2590 BC
- Died: c. 2500 BC (aged c. 90)
- Burial: Mastaba G 7350, Giza East Field (?) Mastaba G 7110-7120, Giza East Field (?)
- Spouse: Kawab; Djedefre
- Issue: Mindjedef; Meresankh III; Neferhetepes
- Father: Khufu
- Mother: Possibly Meritites I
- Religion: Ancient Egyptian religion

Hetepheres II (c. 2590 BC - c. 2500 BC) was a queen of ancient Egypt during the 4th Dynasty.

== Biography ==
=== Birth and family ===
Queen Hetepheres II may have been one of the longest-lived members of the royal family of the Fourth Dynasty of Egypt, which lasted from c. 2723 to 2563 BC. She was a daughter of Khufu and was either born during the reign of her grandfather Sneferu or during the early years of her father's reign. She was named after her grandmother, Hetepheres I and she had an aunt named Hetepheres A. A fragmentary titulature found in the tomb of Meritites I may indicate that she was the mother of Hetepheres II.

Titles of Hetepheres II

- Daughter of the King of Upper and Lower Egypt Khufu (zat-nesut-biti-Khufu, zꜣt nswt bjtj ḫw.f-wj)
- King’s beloved daughter of his body (zat-nesut-khetef-meretef, zꜣt nswt ẖt.f mrt.f)
- King’s Daughter (zat-nesut, zꜣt nswt)
- King’s wife (hemet-nesut, ḥmt nswt)
- King’s wife, his beloved (hemet-nesut-meretef, ḥmt nswt mrt.f)
- Beholder of Horus and Seth, (maat-hor-setesh, mꜣꜣt ḥr-stš)
- Follower of Horus (xt ḥr)
- Intimate of Horus (Tist ḥr)
- Companion of Horus (semer[et]-hor, smr[t] ḥr)
- Consort of him who is beloved of the Two Ladies (semayet-meret-nebti, smꜣyt mry nbtj)
- Great favorite (wrt Hts)
- Controller of the butchers of the acacia house (kherep-seshem-shendjet, ḫrp sšm[tyw] šnḏt)
- Priestess of Thoth (hemet-netjer-djehuti, ḥmt-nṯr ḏḥwtj)
- Priestess of Bapefy (hemet-netjer-bapef, ḥmt-nṯr bꜣpf)
- Priestess of Tjasep (ḥmt-nṯr TA-sp)

=== Marriages ===
During the reign of Khufu, Hetepheres II married her brother, the Crown Prince Kawab, with whom she had at least 2 children, a daughter named Meresankh III and a son named Mindjedef. After the death of her first husband, she married another of her brothers, Djedefre who later succeeded Khufu as king of Egypt.

She was widowed a second time when Djedefre died. The marriage of her daughter, Meresankh III, to her late second husband's brother and successor Khafre made Hetepheres II the mother-in-law of the new king. She would outlive Meresankh III. A mark of her affection for Meresankh III may be seen in the fact that Hetepheres II had her own mastaba in the eastern cemetery of Giza converted into a tomb for her daughter's use. Hetepheres II herself was probably buried in tomb G7350 even though she possessed a joint tomb with her first husband, Kawab (G7110 and 7120 respectively).

While marriage within the royal family was common, multiple marriages to this extent was not. It has been suggested her subsequent marriage to Djedefre was honorary in nature and done in order to maintain her position at court. She never produced an heir to the throne in her second marriage and was never given the title of King's Mother.

Hetepheres finally died early in the reign of Shepseskaf, the son and successor of Menkaura, and had thus witnessed the reigns of at least five and perhaps six (if she was born during the reign of Sneferu) kings of the Fourth Dynasty.

== Children ==
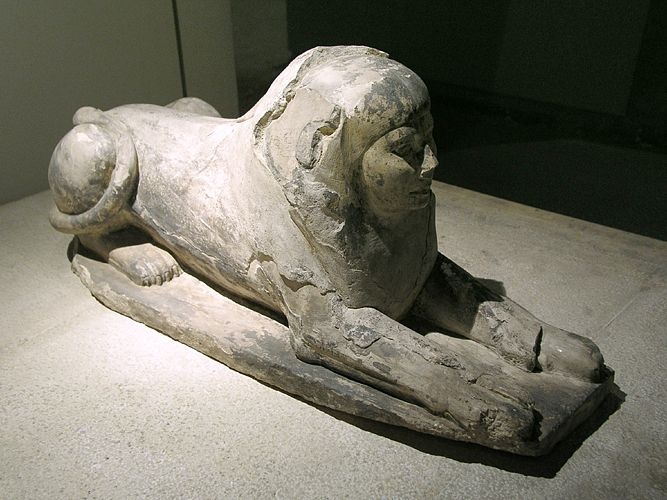
Hetepheres II depicted as a sphinx, possibly the first, from Abu Rawash pyramid of Djedefre – Cairo Museum

=== Children with Kawab ===
- Mindjedef: "King’s son of his body", "Hereditary prince", "Treasurer of the King of Lower Egypt", etc. His wife was named Khufu-ankh. His tomb is located in Giza: G 7760.
- Meresankh III: Wife of Khafre.

=== Children with Djedefre ===
- Neferhetepes

=== Possible children with Kawab ===
- Duaenhor dwA n Hr (Manuel de Codage: dwAnHr) – "King’s son of his body", "Companion of his father". Buried in G 7550.
- Kaemsekhem: "King’s son", "Director of the Palace". The wife of Kaemsekhem is named Ka'aper kA a p r (Manuel de Codage: kAapr). He may be the father of Rawer and Minkhaf. His tomb was located in Giza: G 7660.
