= Meresankh III =

Ancient Egyptian queen consort

mr s anx
Mrs ˁnḫ
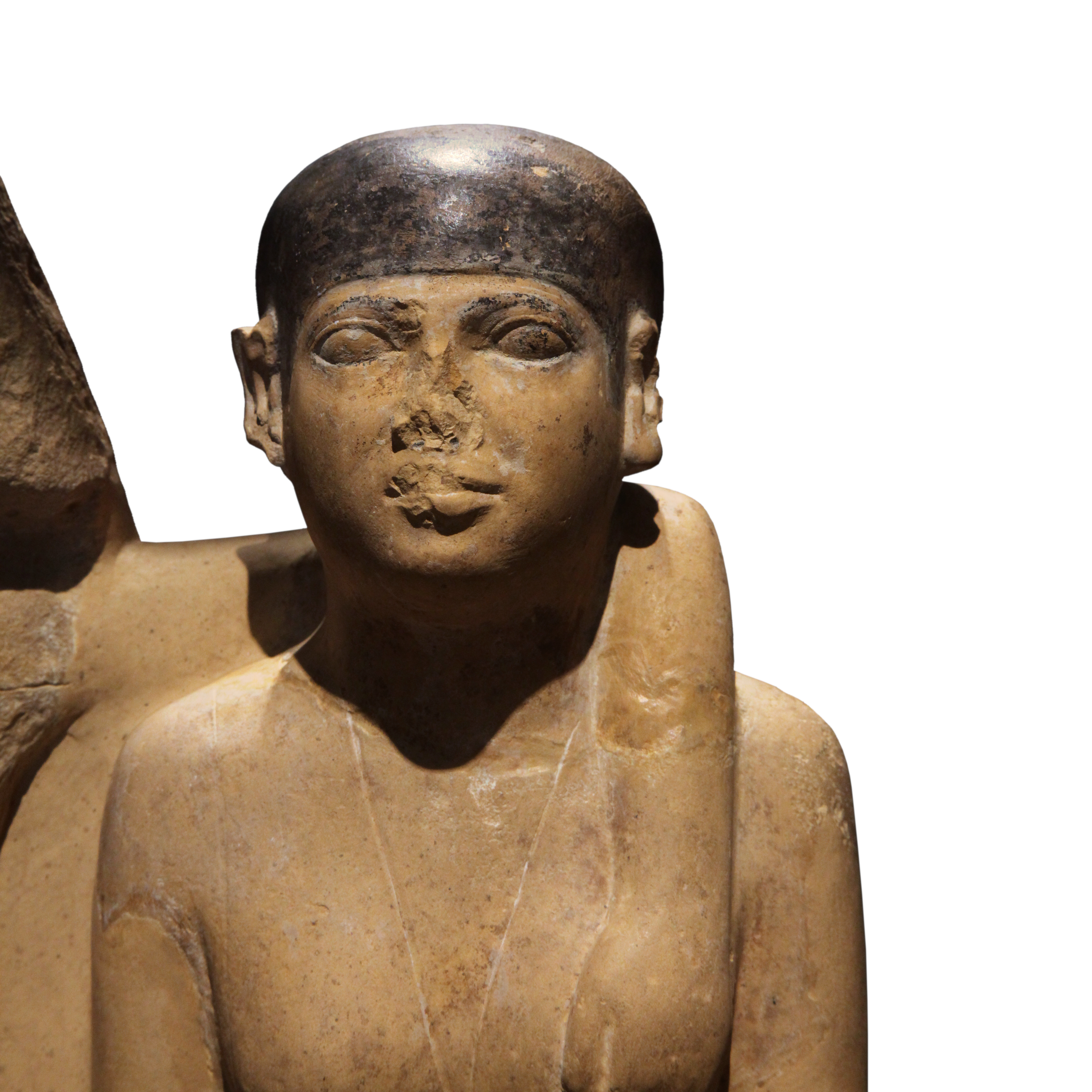

Queen consort of Egypt
- Tenure: c. 2550 BC
- Born: c. 2578 BC
- Died: c. 2520 BC (aged c. 53)
- Burial: Egyptian Museum, Cairo, Egypt
- Spouse: Khafre
- Issue: Nebemakhet; Duaenre; Kenterka; Niuserre (A); Ankhemre; Shepsetkau
- Father: Kawab
- Mother: Hetepheres II
- Religion: Ancient Egyptian religion

Meresankh III (c. 2578 BC - c. 2520 BC) was the daughter of Hetepheres II and Prince Kawab and a granddaughter of the Egyptian king Khufu. She was the wife of King Khafre.

Hetepheres also provided her daughter with a black granite sarcophagus decorated with palace facades for Meresankh's burial.

Her tomb was discovered by archeologist George Reisner on April 23, 1927, with subsequent excavations undertaken by his team on behalf of Harvard University and the Museum of Fine Arts, Boston.

Her sarcophagus and skeleton are today located in the Egyptian Museum; the latter reveals that she was 1.54 metres (5 ft 1 in) tall and between 50 and 55 years at her death. An anthropological study suggested that she might have suffered from bilateral silent sinus syndrome.

The tomb also contained a set of the earliest known canopic jars. A limestone statue depicting Queen Hetepheres embracing her late daughter Meresankh was found in her tomb and is today located in the Museum of Fine Arts in Boston.

== Meresankh III's children ==
The children of Meresankh and Khafre include:

- Nebemakhet: Buried in Mastaba 8172. His titles include scribe of the (divine) book, elder of the snwt-house of his father, chief justice and vizier, hereditary prince, king's son of his body, chief lector-priest, khet-priest of the Great One, khet-priest of (?) Temp. Khephren to Menkaure or a little later. In the mastaba Duaenre, and Niuserre are mentioned. As well as a brother named Ankhemre. Nebemakhet's wife was named Nubhotep, Prophetess of Hathor Mistress-of-the-Sycamore in all her places, etc.
- Duaenre: Mastaba G5110 Vizier of Menkaure. Possibly the father of vizier Babaef.
- Kenterka: Mentioned in Meresankh's tomb. Khenterka is assumed by some to be a son of Meresankh III.
- Niuserre (A) (Ny-user-Re-ankh (?) is mentioned in Meresankh's tomb): King's son of his body, Chief lector-priest of his father, Treasurer of the King of Lower Egypt, etc. Middle to end of Dyn. IV. (Unfinished Rock cut tomb in central field)
- Ankhemre: King's son of his body. Mentioned in the inner chapel of his brother Nebemakhet.
- Shepsetkau: mentioned in Nebemakhet's Mastaba.

== Ancestry ==
Ancestors of Meresankh III

Khufu
Kawab
Sneferu
Meritites I
Meresankh III
Khufu
Hetepheres II
