= Kaemsekhem =

Egyptian nobleman

D28 m s x sxm
K3 m sḫm
- Prince of Egypt
- Born: c. 2570 BC
- Burial: mastaba G 7660, Giza
- Spouse: Ka'aper
- Issue: Rawer; Minkhaf II
- Father: Possibly Kawab
- Mother: Possibly Hetepheres II
- Religion: Ancient Egyptian religion

Kaemsekhem (born c. 2570 BC) was an ancient Egyptian nobleman and probably the son of Crown Prince Kawab and Hetepheres II. He later served as the director of the royal palace. He was buried in mastaba G 7660 in the Giza East Field, which is part of the Giza Necropolis.

== Family ==
Kaemsekhem was probably a son of Prince Kawab and Queen Hetepheres II. He was born during the reign of King Khufu, who may be his grandfather. Kaemsekhem's wife was Ka'aper, and they had two sons named Rawer and Minkhaf.

The titles of Kaemsekhem were: King’s [grand]son, Director of the Palace, etc.

== Tomb ==
Kaemsekhem was buried at Giza in mastaba G 7660. In the tomb, his father and mother are mentioned.

The chapel was decorated but the scenes are damaged. In the chapel, an offering scene would have shown Kaesekhem seated before a table with offerings. On the west wall, fragmentary scenes showing the slaughter of animals remain. In another scene on the west wall, Kaemsekhem and his wife Ka'aper are depicted. Kaemsekhem was standing with a staff, dressed in a short outfit with a panther-skin over it. His wife is standing beside her husband with her arm over his shoulder. In front of Kaemsekhem a small boy named Minkhaf is shown holding his father's staff with his right hand. To the left of this scene five registers of small figures, including images representing the funerary estates, are shown. The registers also show servants bringing birds and other items. Scribes are shown in the scenes as well.

On the north wall a large boating scene dominates the top of the wall. Below this scene women are shown carrying bags, boxes and other items. Further scenes show the slaughter of a bull. The scenes on the south wall are largely destroyed, but scenes flanking the doorway depicted Khaemsekhem and his wife Ka'aper. One scene on the facade shows Khaemsekhem standing with a staff, while a son must have held on to this staff. The son's figure has been obliterated but his name is recorded as Rawer.

Shaft G 7660A belonged to Ka'aper, the wife. There was no canopic pit, and no trace of the original funerary equipment was found in this shaft. Shaft G 7660B belonged to Kaemsekhem and consisted of two chambers. The second chamber was the burial chamber and still contained the granite sarcophagus of Kaemsekhem. It was inscribed with his name and titles and is now in the Egyptian Museum in Cairo.

== Later constructions ==
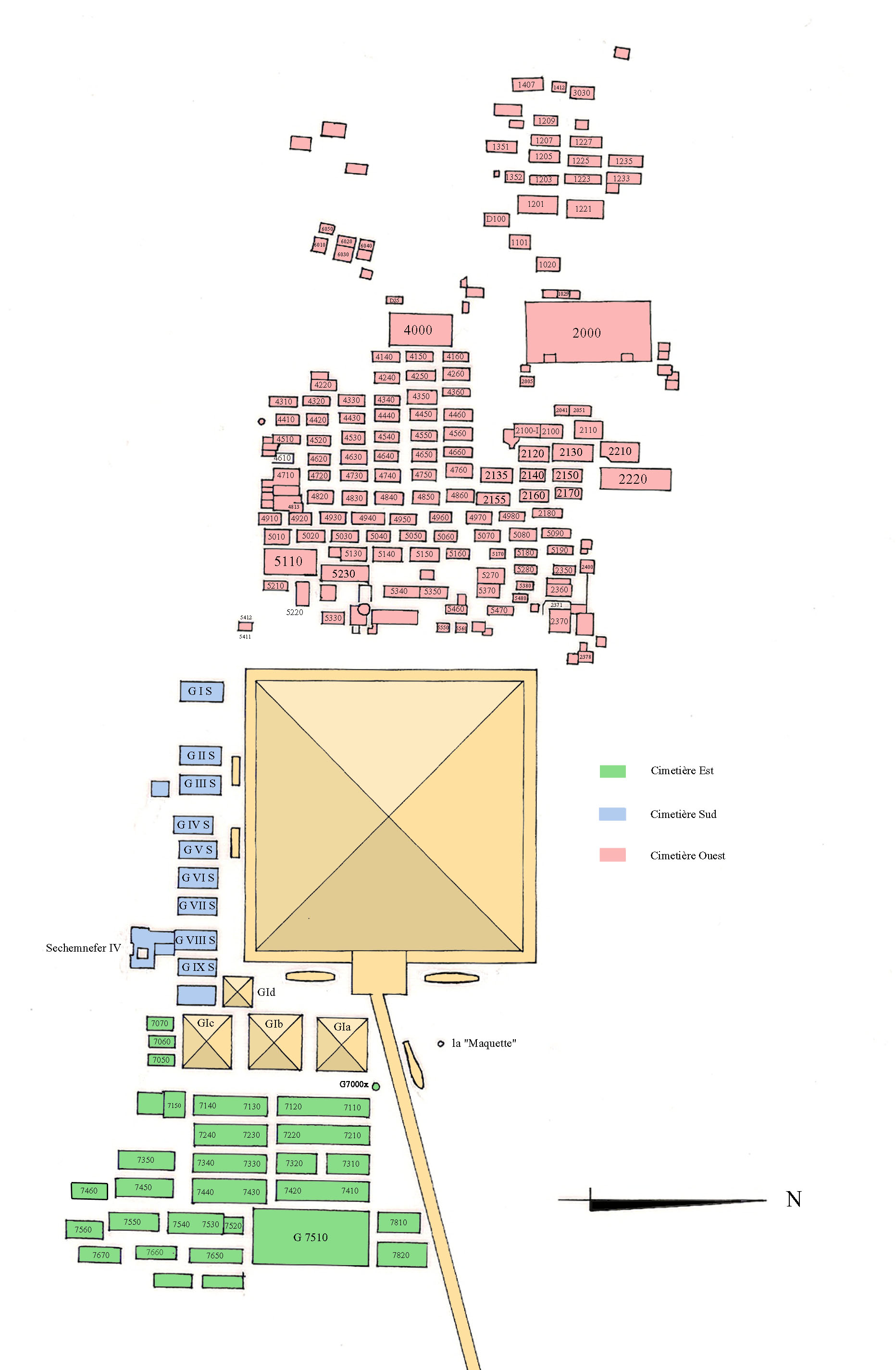
Tomb of Kaemsekhem is located near the east side(depicted in green) compared to the Great Pyramid of Giza as shown in the centre of the picture.

Later in the Old kingdom, several smaller mastabas were built near G 7660. To the north a small mastaba (G 7652) was built up against Kaemsekhem's tomb. To the north-east G 7652 was added, while to the east G 7662 and G 7663 were constructed. These additional mastabas were constructed during the 5th Dynasty or 6th Dynasty.

During the Ptolemaic Period, superstructures were added and several burial shafts constructed.
