= Raherka and Meresankh =

Ancient Egyptian statue

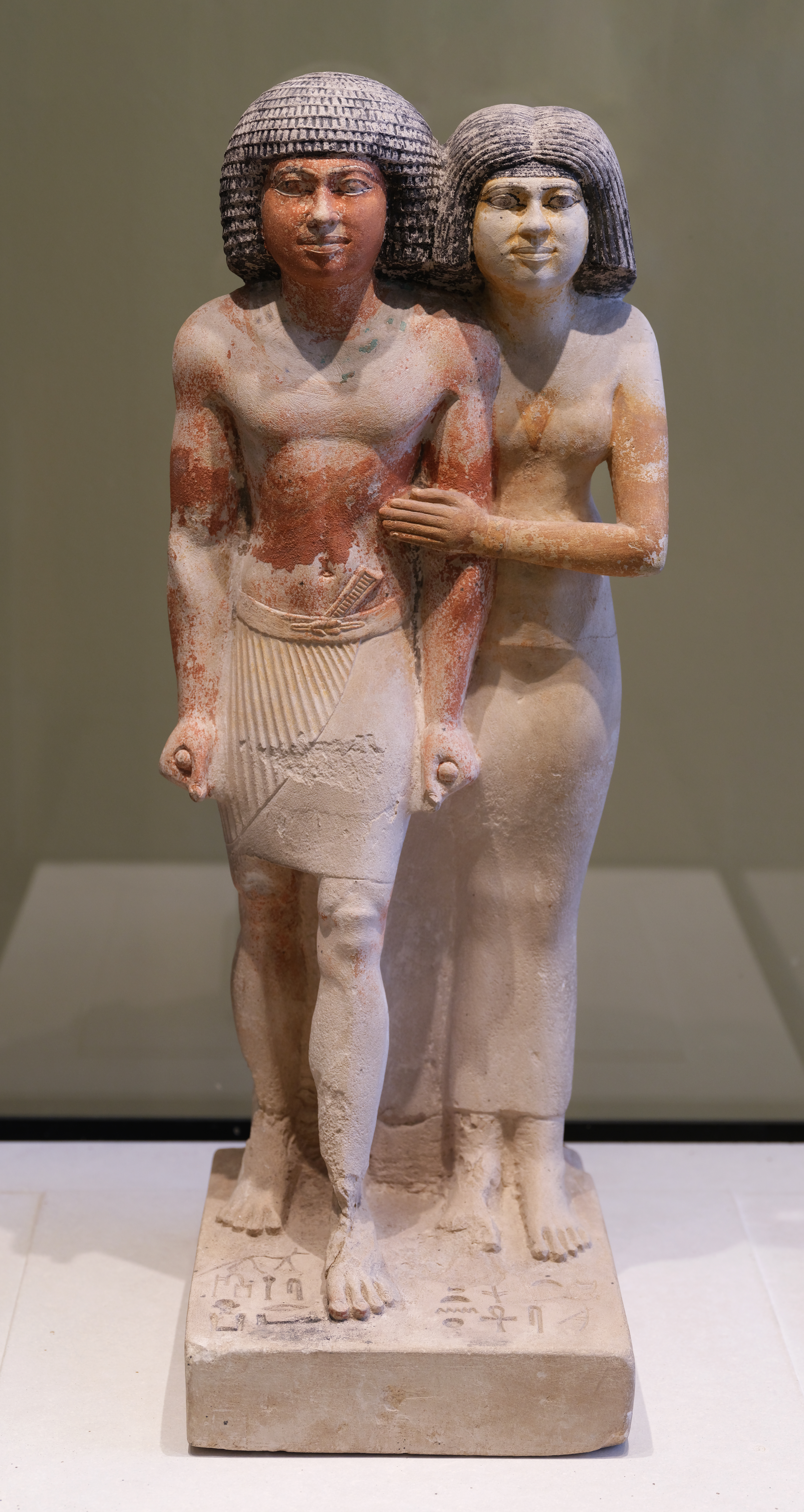
- Material: Limestone
- Height: 52.8 cm
- Discovered: 1902; Giza, Giza Governorate, Egypt
- Discovered by: Montague Ballard
- Present location: Paris, Ile-de-France, France

Raherka and Meresankh in hieroglyphs
N5 a D2 kA
Raherka
U6 S29 S34 n Aa1
Meresankh
"she loves life"

Raherka and Meresankh (Raherka: "Ra = the Sun god" and Meresankh: "she loves life") is a group statue of an ancient Egyptian couple of the 4th Dynasty or 5th Dynasty.

== Background ==
Raherka held high administrative responsibilities. He was an "inspector of scribes of the jackal". Meresankh's title was "King's acquaintance", which means she had access to the royal palace.

== Statue ==
The couple is known from their beautiful pair-statue now in the Louvre (E 15592), which is an example of portraiture in Ancient Egypt. The statue is carved from limestone and is 52.8 centimetres (20.8 in) high. The husband and wife are carefully modeled with Raherka's figure showing musculature. The pair-statue is painted in multiple colors. The husband is rendered in the traditional red skin color used for males, while his wife Meresankh is painted in a yellow toned skin color which was standard for that time. The wigs and eyeliners are painted black.

The statue of Raherka and Meresankh has been compared to that of the dwarf Seneb and his family. In both statues the wife is shown warmly embracing her husband.

The German Egyptologists Hermann Junker had dated the pair statue to the end of the Old Kingdom, and it has been suggested that the statue dates to the 5th Dynasty. Others have suggested that the pose of the wife and the names point to the 4th Dynasty.

The statue was found in 1902 by Montague Ballard and probably comes from tomb D 37 which is located in the Steindorff cemetery in Giza. Fragments of another statue depicting a woman carrying a child were found just north of the tomb and are now in the Leipzig Museum (Inv. 2446).
