= Giza West Field =

Ancient cemetery in Egypt

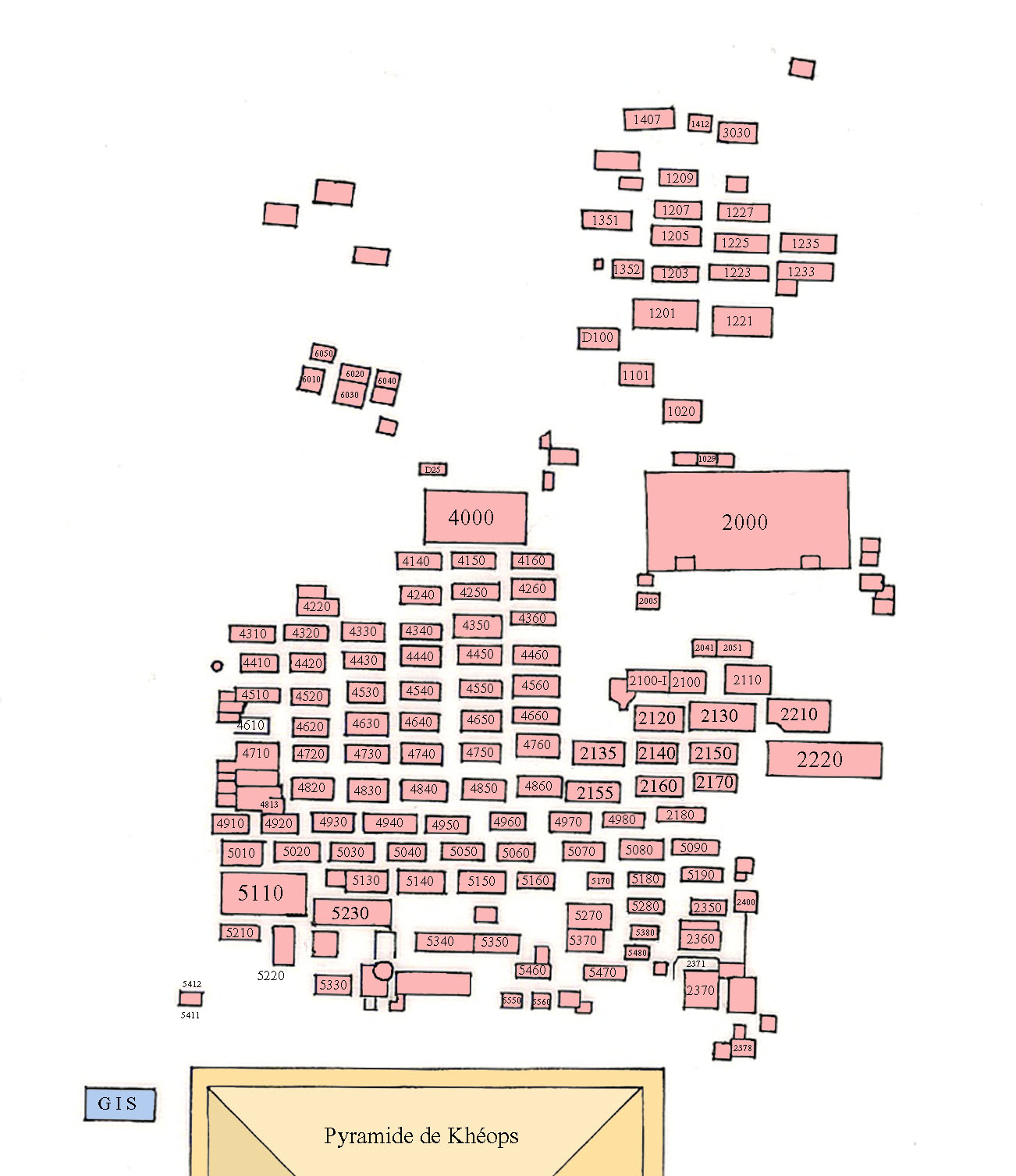
The West Field at Giza

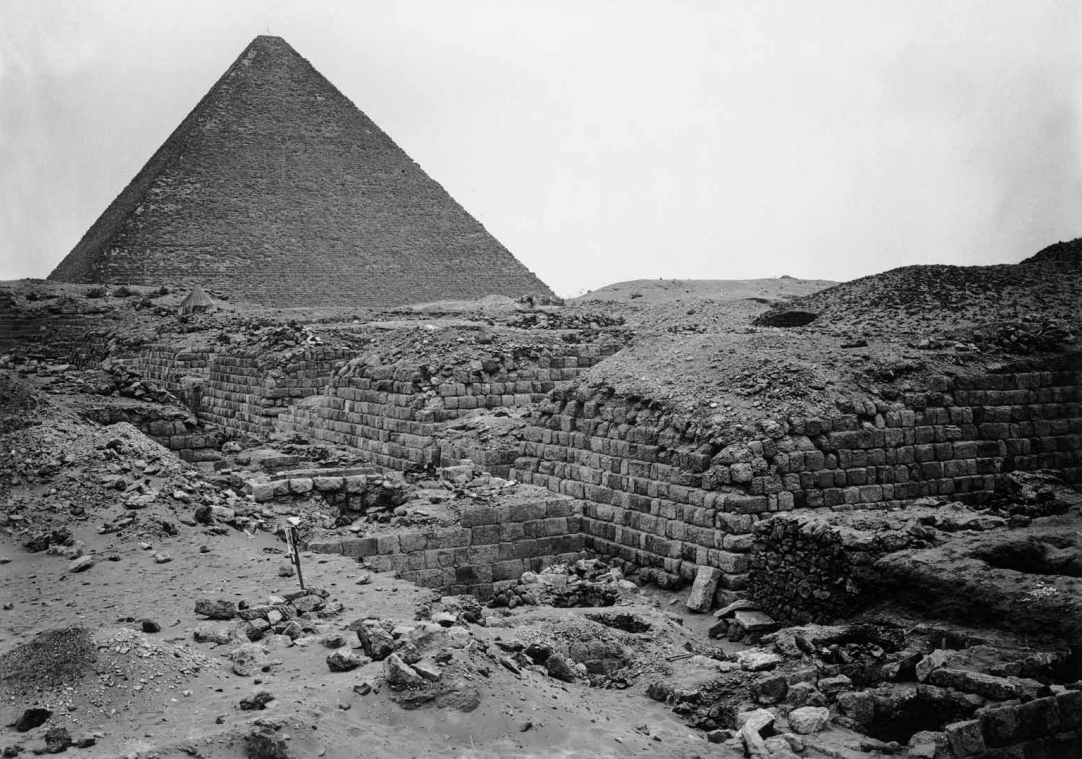
Cemetery G1200 (in 1906)

The West Field is located on the Giza Plateau, to the west of the Great Pyramid of Giza. It is divided up into smaller areas like the cemeteries known as the Abu Bakr Excavations (1949–50, 1950–51, 1952 and 1953), as well as several cemeteries whose toponyms are based on the mastaba numbers such as Cemetery G 1000 and Cemetery G 1100. The West Field contains Cemetery G1000 – Cemetery G1600, and Cemetery G 1900. Further cemeteries in this field are: Cemeteries G 2000, G 2200, G 2500, G 3000, G 4000, and G 6000. Three other cemeteries are named after their excavators: Junker Cemetery West, Junker Cemetery East and Steindorff Cemetery.

== Cemetery G1000 ==
Tomb number	Type	Name of owner	Title owner	Time Period	Comments
G 1008	Stone Mastaba	Shepseskafankh	Strong-of-voice of the judiciary	5th dynasty	
G 1011	Stone Mastaba	Sedjemu	Royal acquaintance, inspector of the strong-of-voice of the treasury, keeper of the storehouse of gold	5th dynasty	
G 1012	Stone Mastaba	Sedaug	Priest of Sahure, priest of Re in the sun-temple of Userkaf, royal acquaintance, etc.	5th to 6th dynasty	Several items are now in a museum in Vienna.
G 1018	Stone and rubble Mastaba	Tjeset	Royal acquaintance		
G 1020	Stone Mastaba	Messa		Late 4th – early 5th dynasty	A seated pair statue depicting Messa's son Hetepi and his wife Renpetnefert was found.
G 1021	Stone Mastaba			5th to 6th dynasty	
G 1022	Mud-brick mastaba	Hetepib	Inspector of the wabet		Wife: Setepet; Son: Inkaf
G 1026	Stone Mastaba	Ma	director of royal wab-priests, inspector of palace attendants	5th to 6th dynasty	
G 1029	Stone Mastaba	Sekhemka	priest of Re in the sun-temple of Niuserre, secretary, overseer of the department of palace attendants of the Great House, etc.	5th dynasty (after Neferirkare)	
G 1032	Stone and rubble Mastaba	Hetepib and his wife Setepet?	Inspector of the wabet	6th dynasty	Hetepib and Setepet are currently linked to G 1022, but are now thought to belong with G 1032.
G 1033	Mud-brick and rubble mastaba	Nikaure	Royal acquaintance		
G 1036	Stone mastaba	Seneb	Royal acquaintance	Late Dynasty 5 or Dynasty 6	
G 1038	Stone and rubble mastaba	Kaaper	Royal acquaintance, Scribe		Wife: Insen
G 1039	Stone mastaba	Possibly Mertash	Royal acquaintance	Late Dynasty 5 or Dynasty 6	Wife Intkaes and son Senenu are subject of a seated family statue.
G 1040 +1041	Double Mastaba	Teti	Royal acquaintance, inspector of builders	Late Dynasty 5 or Dynasty 6	
G 1047	Stone mastaba	Niankhmin	Priest of the pyramid of Menkauhor, priest of the pyramid of Niuserre	6th dynasty	
G 1062	Mud-brick mastaba	Henenef	Goldsmith	Late Old Kingdom	

== Cemetery G 1100 ==
Tomb number	Type	Name of owner	Title owner	Time Period	Comments
G 1104 +1105	Double mastaba	Sames and Petpennisut	Sames: Royal acquaintance, inspector of the boat	Late Dynasty 5	
G 1109	Mud-brick mastaba			Late 4th – early 5th dynasty	Family statue of a man and his wife Meretib and daughter Satmeret found in the mastaba
G 1111	Stone mastaba	Niankhnemty	inspector of officials	Dynasty 5 or 6	
G 1119	Stone mastaba				Limestone offering basin inscribed for Iyankhenef (royal acquaintance, overseer of scribes) and Nefret found in G 1119
G 1123	Rubble built mastaba	Tebash	overseer of builders	Dynasty 6	Wife of Tebash: Merut
G 1151	Stone mastaba	Neferqed and his wife Hemetre	royal acquaintance of the Great House, inspector of palace attendants of the Great House, priest of Khufu, etc.	End of 5th dynasty or later	
G 1152	Stone mastaba			End of 5th dynasty or later	Fragment of limestone lintel inscribed for Nikamin reused as roofing
G 1156	Stone mastaba	Ptahhetep	Juridical overseer of scribes, judge and administrator, preeminent of place, great one of the tens of Upper Egypt	End of 5th dynasty	
G 1162 +1172	The mastabas are a mud-brick and rubble construction	Teti and his wife Maa	overseer of builders, royal acquaintance		
G 1171	Stone mastaba	Kaemtjenenet	royal wab-priest	5th to 6th dynasty	

== Cemetery G 1200 ==
Tomb number	Type	Name of owner	Title owner	Time Period	Comments
G 1201	Stone-Mastaba	Wepemnofret	Commander of the king's scribes, great one of the tens of Upper Egypt, king's son, etc.	4th Dynasty (Khufu)	
G 1203	Stone-Mastaba	Kanefer	Overseer of Commissions and Director of Bowmen	4th Dynasty (Khufu)	
G 1204	Stone-Mastaba	Akhethetep	Royal acquaintance, inspector of priests of the pyramid of Khufu, great one of the tens of Upper Egypt	Mid 5th Dynasty or later	Two wives appear in the tomb: Seshseshet and Khenti. A son named Khufuankh is mentioned.
G 1205	Stone-Mastaba	Khufunakht	Royal acquaintance	4th Dynasty (Khufu)	
G 1206	Stone-Mastaba	Ikhetneb	Royal acquaintance, inspector of wa’b-priests	Mid 5th Dynasty or later	A statue of Ikhetneb and his wife is now in the Berkeley Museum
G 1207	Stone-Mastaba	Nefer(t)	Royal acquaintance	4th Dynasty (Khufu or later)	
G 1208	Stone-Mastaba	Akhethetep and his wife Meritites	Prophet of Khufu, Overseer of the Pyramid of Khufu, Overseer of the expedition, etc.	Mid 5th Dynasty or later	Meritites II was possibly a daughter of Khufu
G 1213	Stone-Mastaba			5th or 6th Dynasty	A servant statue was discovered in the tomb.
G 1214	Stone-Mastaba	Katjesu and his wife Itjetka?		5th Dynasty	
G 1221	Mud-Brick mastaba	Shad	Royal acquaintance	Probably 5th Dynasty	
G 1223	Stone-Mastaba	Kaemah	King's son, Overseer of the phylai of Upper Egypt, Greatest of the Ten of Upper Egypt.	4th Dynasty (Time of Khufu)	A stela of Kaemah is now in the Berkeley museum
G 1225	Stone-Mastaba	Nefertiabet	King's daughter	Mid 4th Dynasty	The mastaba has an annex also dating to the 4th dynasty.
G 1226				5th or 6th Dynasty	
G 1227	Stone-Mastaba	Setjihekenet	Royal acquaintance	Mid or late 4th Dynasty	A limestone slab stela (Egyptian Museum Cairo JE 37726) was found in the tomb.
G 1228	Stone-Mastaba			Late Old Kingdom	A Limestone lintel inscribed for Inkaf and Medunefret-hemet was used to construct the roof. Reisner called this tomb G 1227 Annex.
G 1231				5th Dynasty	
G 1234	Stone-Mastaba	Ankhaf	Judge and Boundary official of the Great House, Overseer of tenants of the Great House, Noble of the King.	Late 5th or 6th Dynasty	Dated by Harpur to the reign of Unis and Teti.
G 1235	Stone-Mastaba	Ini	Director of cattle-herdsmen and the pastures.	4th Dynasty (time of Khufu)	

== Cemetery G 1400 ==
Tomb number	Type	Name of owner	Title owner	Time Period	Comments
G 1402	Rubble-built mastaba	Sabu	Overseer of the craftsmen of weaving	5th dynasty	
G 1408 +1409	Stone and brick mastaba	Ish[...]	Royal acquaintance, sem-priest, etc.	5th dynasty	Mentioned on a false door with his wife Khentkaus
G 1452 +1453	Mud brick mastaba	Djedwai and Kaninisut'	Djedwai: royal acquaintance, priest of Khufu, etc. Kaninisut: royal acquaintance	5th dynasty or later	
G 1457	Mud brick mastaba	Nisutnefret	Secretary of the king, director of royal wab-priests, overseer of the pyramid of Khufu, etc.	5th dynasty	Nisutnefret's wife Peretim is mentioned on the false door.

== Cemetery G 1500 ==
Tomb number	Type	Name of owner	Title owner	Time Period	Comments
G 1501	Stone mastaba	Irankhptah	Steward	5th dynasty	

== Cemetery G 1600 ==
Tomb number	Type	Name of owner	Title owner	Time Period	Comments
G 1607	Rock-cut tomb	Ian	Overseer of the house of weavers of the royal children	Late 4th dynasty	
G 1608	Rock-cut tomb	Senenu	Inspector of ka-priests	Late 4th dynasty	
G 1636	Rubble built mastaba	Merernisut	Ship's carpenter, elder of the dockyard		
G 1673	Stone mastaba	Qednes	Elder of the judicial court of the pyramid of Khufu, secretary of judgements	Late 5th or 6th dynasty	Qednes' wife: Niankhhathor

== Cemetery G 2100 ==
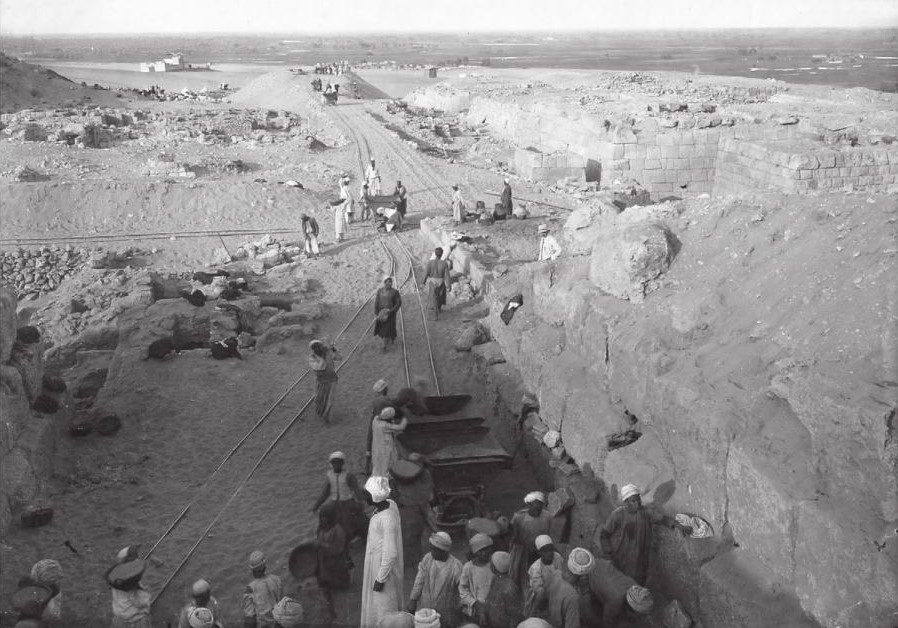
Area west of Cemetery G 2100 being cleared by the German-Austrian expedition using a narrow gauge railway, ca 1912

Cemetery G 2100 was first excavated by Lepsius in 1842. The first tomb to be cleared was the mastaba owned by Merib (G 2100). In 1905/6 the Harvard-Boston Museum expedition excavated this cemetery and further excavations date to 1912-13 and 1931–32. The cemetery consists of four rows of large mastabas:

- The westernmost row consists of the mastabas of Merib (G 2100 I), Sedit (G 2100) and Nefer (G 2110).
- A second row consists of the mastabas of Seshatsekhentiu (G 2120), Khentka (G 2130).
- The third row consists of mastabas G 2135 (Unknown), G 2140 (Unknown) and G 2150 (Kanefer)
- The fourth row consists of the mastabas of Kaninisut I (G 2155) and G 2160 and G 2170 (both owners unknown)

The other smaller mastabas were built among these larger structures. The presence of Reserve heads and slab stela points to the reign of Khufu for the construction of the earliest of the tombs in this cemetery.

Tomb number	Type	Name of owner	Title owner	Time Period	Comments
G 2100	Stone mastaba	Princess Sedit	king's daughter of his body, priestess of Neith north of her wall	4th dynasty	Mother of Merib (G 2100 I). Contain a stone inscription tablet mentioning Abuwtiyuw, believed to have been a royal guard dog who lived in the Sixth Dynasty (2345–2181 BC), used as spolia.
G 2100 I	Stone mastaba	Prince Merib Kapunisut	king's son of his body, companion, overseer of royal works, etc.	4th-5th dynasty	Son of Sedit. Merib's sons: Khufumernetjeru, Merib-nedjes; Daughters: Nensedjerkai I, Sednet
G 2100 II	Stone mastaba	Nensedjerkai I	king's daughter, royal ornament, priestess of Hathor, priestess of Khufu	4th-5th dynasty	Daughter of Merib (G 2100 I)
G 2110	Stone mastaba	Nefer	chief of the estate, overseer of scribes of the portfolios of the king, secretary of the king in all places, etc.	4th dynasty	A Reserve head of Nefer was found in the tomb.
G 2120	Stone mastaba	Seshatsekhentiu	lector priest, etc.	4th dynasty	
G 2130	Stone mastaba	Khentka	king's son (of his body), (sole) companion	4th dynasty	
G 2132	Stone and brick mastaba	Senwehem	royal wab-priest, ka-priest	6th dynasty	
G 2135	Stone	Unknown		4th dynasty	
G 2135a	Stone mastaba	Qedfy	royal acquaintance, overseer of ka-priests	5th dynasty or later	
G 2136	Stone mastaba	Kahif	royal wab-priest, inspector of palace attendants	6th dynasty	
G 2136a	Stone mastaba	Djednefret	secretary	Late 6th dynasty	Eldest son of Kahif (G 2136)
G 2136b	Stone mastaba	Nimaatre	overseer of commissions of the Great House	Late Old Kingdom	
G 2138	Stone mastaba	Sernefermerer(?)	palace attendant of the Great House, secretary of his lord		
G 2140	Stone mastaba	Unknown		4th dynasty	
G 2150	Stone mastaba	Kanefer	Overseer of commissions, director of the palace, etc.	5th dynasty	
G 2151	Stone and brick mastaba	Ptahwer	Royal acquaintance, overseer of ka-priests		
G 2155	Stone mastaba	Kaninisut I		5th dynasty	
G 2156'	Stone mastaba	Redines		6th dynasty	
G 2156	Stone mastaba	Kaninisut II	Great one of the tens of Upper Egypt, priest of Maat, secretary of his lord, priest of Khufu	5th dynasty	Son of Kaninisut I (owner of G 2155)
G 2156a	Stone mastaba	Kaninisut III	royal acquaintance	5th dynasty	Son of Kaninisut II; Probably father of Irienre.
G 2156b	Stone mastaba	Irienre and Akhemre	Irienre: inspector of priests, overseer of ka-priests	5th–6th dynasty	Akhemre is a son of Irienre.
G 2156c	Stone mastaba	Irienre and Akhemre		5th–6th dynasty	
G 2160	Stone mastaba	Unknown		4th dynasty	
G 2170	Stone mastaba	Unknown		4th dynasty	
G 2172	Stone and rubble mastaba	Ip	royal wab-priest		
G 2175	Stone mastaba	Nedju and Khnumnefer	Nedju: royal acquaintance, royal wab-priest Khnumnefer: royal wab-priest	Beginning of 5th dynasty	
G 2184	Stone mastaba	Akhmerutnisut	Overseer of the department of palace attendants of the Great House	5th dynasty	
G 2185	Stone and brick mastaba	Nefersehefen		5th–6th dynasty	
G 2191	Stone mastaba	Khnemu	master butcher of the Great House, etc.	5th dynasty	
G 2192	Stone mastaba	Inenka	major-domo of the Great House		
G 2196	Stone mastaba	Iasen	overseer of six palace attendants of the Great House, priest of Khufu, etc.	5th–6th dynasty	
G 2197	Stone mastaba	Penmeru	royal wab-priest, priest of Menkaure, director of the dining hall, etc.	end of 5th dynasty	

== Cemetery G 2300 ==
The family complex of Senedjemib Inti makes up an important part of this cemetery. Senedjemib Inti (G 2370) was vizier and chief architect to King Djedkare Isesi. His son Senedjemib Mehi (G 2378) followed in his footsteps as the vizier and chief architect under Unas, and eventually another son named Khnumenti (G 2374) became vizier under Teti. A man named Mer-ptah-ankh-meryre Nekhebu (G 2381) may be a grandson of Inti. Nekhebu's sons Mer-ptah-ankh-meryre Ptahshepses Impy and Sabu-ptah Ibebi were buried in this cemetery as well.

Tomb number	Type	Name of owner	Title owner	Time Period	Comments
G 2335		Shepsi		5th dynasty ?	A wooden coffin inscribed for Shepsi was found in the burial chamber.
G 2336		Khuptah	Steward	5th–6th dynasty ?	
G 2337 X		Djaty	Steward, his estate servant (with reference to the vizier Senedjemib), etc.	6th dynasty	Son of Teti(a steward) and Shafet
G 2352		Hagy		End of dynasty 5 or later	
G 2353		Herunefer		Dyn. 5	
G 2360		Sekhemka			
G 2361		Maa	Overseer of barbers.	Dyn. 6	
G 2362		Rudj	Supervisor of ka-servants, Scribe of a phyle, Judge and Overseer of scribes	Dyn. 6	
G 2364		Senedjemib Inti	A king's scribe and priest	Dyn 5, Time of Djedkare Isesi – Unis?	May have served his more famous namesake buried in G2370.
G 2366		'Nimesti'	Steward, overseer of clothing distribution, etc.	Dynasty 6 ?	Wife: Kamerites, a priestess of Neith and Hathor. Sons: Irenakhty and Neferkhent
G 2370		Senedjemib Inti	Chief justice and vizier, etc.	Dynasty 5, Time of Djedkare Isesi	Wife: Tjefi; Sons: Senedjemib, Ny-ankh-menu, Fetek[ti], Senedjemib Mehi, Khnumenti
G 2374		Khnumenti	Chief justice and vizier, etc.	Dynasty 6, Time of Teti	Son of Senedjemib Inti, He appears to have carried on his father's duties under Teti.
G 2375		Akhetmehu	Judge and Elder of the Hall, Overseer of the House of Weapons.	Temp. Merenre I or Pepy II	Or possibly an older mastaba belonging to a man who had no apparent connection with the Senedjemib family
G 2375a		Ankhirptah	Judge and Keeper of Nekhen.	Late Dyn. 6	
G 2378		Senedjemib Mehi	Chief justice and vizier, etc.	Time of Unis	Son of Senedjemib Inti ( G 2370) Wife: Khentkaues (the king's daughter of his body), Priestess of Hathor; Daughter: Khentkaues. Sons: Senedjemib and Mehi; Later two additions to the mastaba of Mehi (G 2376 and G 2377 ) were built on the west and closed off all access to Akhetmehu's chapel. G 2376 a was found open and empty, but G 2377 a contained the skeleton of an adult female.
G 2381 A		Ptahshepses also called Merptah-Ankhmeryre and Impy		Time of Pepi II	Son of Nekhebu (G 2382)
G 2381 C		Sabu-ptah Ibebi		Possibly time of Pepi II	The burial shaft containing the burial of Impy's brother (another son of Nekhebu).
G 2382 A		Nekhebu also called Merptah-Ankhmeryre	King's Architect and Builder in the Two Houses, Overseer of all the Works of the King, etc.	Time of Pepi I	Possibly Inti's grandson?
G 2384		Senedjemib			This mastaba may well have belonged to the elder son of Senedjemib Mehi, likewise named Senedjemib, who is depicted in his father's mastaba.
G 2387		Pepy-Meryptah-ankh		Middle Dyn. 6	Possibly son of Khnementi (tomb G 2374).
G 2391		Irenakhet Iri		Dynasty 6	Also known as the tomb of funerary priests of Senedjemib family.

== Cemetery G 4000 ==
Tomb number	Type	Name of owner	Title owner	Time Period	Comments
G 4000	Stone mastaba	Prince Hemiunu	King's son of his body, Chief Justice and Vizier, etc.	4th dynasty (Khufu)	Son of Prince Nefermaat and his wife Itet
G 4121	Stone mastaba	Ankhmare	Inspector of scribes of the royal documents of the granary.	5th–6th dynasty	Possibly had son named Kawab.
G 4140	Stone mastaba	Princess Meritites	King's daughter of his body	Middle or late Dynasty 4	Burial chamber had reserve head.
G 4150	Stone mastaba	Prince Iunu	King's son, Overseer of the phylai of Upper Egypt, Greatest of the Ten of Upper Egypt.	4th dynasty (Khufu)	Slab stela shows king's son Iunu.
G 4160	Stone mastaba	Unknown		Time of Khufu	Burial chamber contained a Reserve head.
G 4240	Stone mastaba	Prince Sneferuseneb	King's son of his body, sem-priest, Boundary official of Dep, etc.	Middle Dyn. 4-5	Burial chamber contained a Reserve head.
G 4241	Stone mastaba	Rahotep	Judge and administrator, preeminent of place, priest of Maat, overseer of scribes	Early 5th dynasty	
G 4311	Stone mastaba	Neferherenptah	Judge and Elder of the Hall.	5th dynasty	Son of Tjenti and Tjentet.
G 4312	Stone mastaba	Neferseshemka	Priest of Khufu in all his places, royal acquaintance		
G 4340	Stone mastaba	'Anonymous		Middle or late Dynasty 4	Reserve head shows a face different from Sneferuw-seneb, but similar to heads found by Hermann Junker.
G 4351	Stone mastaba	Imsetka	Overseer of the department of tenants of the Great House, Overseer of the Two Houses of Weapons, Prophet of Khufu, etc.	1st Intermediate Period	Wife: Khuitbauinu (?), Prophetess of Hathor Mistress-of-the-Sycamore in all her places, etc.
G 4360	Stone mastaba	Mery-hetepef	Judge and Boundary official	Late 4th, early 5th dynasty	
G 4410	Stone mastaba	Nishepsesnisut?	ka-priest, overseer of linen, etc.	Dyn 5–6	A statue of Nishepsesnesut was found and he may be the owner of the tomb. Further statue of Isesi-ankh found in tomb.
G 4411 (LG 51)	Stone mastaba	Sekhemka	Lector-priest, ma-priest of Anubis, Prophet of Horus qmA-a, etc.	Mid Dyn 5 or later.	Son: Min-khaf
G 4420	Stone mastaba	Tetu		5th–6th dynasty	Son: Nefer-seshemka (G 4422)
G 4422	Stone mastaba	Neferseshemka	royal acquaintance, under-supervisor of the inspectors of the library of the king's administrators, etc.	5th–6th dynasty	Son of Tetu (G 4420)
G 4440	Stone mastaba	Unknown		Mid 4th to early 5th dynasty	Reserve heads of a man and his wife. Possibly a brother of Prince Sneferu-seneb.
G 4442	Stone mastaba	Nebnefretptah Mehi	Steward, overseer of all royal works, Scribe of the granary, and the Treasury,	Dyn. 6 or later.	
G 4461	Stone mastaba	Kapuptah	Royal acquaintance of the Great House	5th dynasty	Wife: Ipep; Sealing with Horus-name of Niuserre.
G 4513	Stone mastaba	Neferihy	Great one of the tens of Upper Egypt, preeminent of place, director of scribes connected with the moon, overseer of the pyramids of Khafre and Menkaure, etc.	6th dynasty	
G 4520	Stone mastaba	Khufuankh	Tenant of the Great House, Overseer of singers of the Great House, Overseer of flutists, etc.	Dynasty 5 (Userkaf)	Parents: Iaunesut and Iupu both Tenants, Wife: Defat-ka, Priestess of Hathor and Priestess of Neith. Son: Mankaura-ankh Daughter: Meritites
G 4521	Stone mastaba	Nishepsesnisut	manicurist		
G 4522	Stone mastaba	Kap?	He who is in charge of the sealed goods of the Great House, palace attendant	Late Dynasty 5	
G 4540	Stone mastaba	Anonymous		Middle or late Dynasty 4	Portrait head of a woman.
G 4561	Stone mastaba	Kaemankh	Inspector of administrators of the treasury, inspector of priests, secretary of the king's treasure, etc.	Dyn. 6 (likely Djedkare Isesi)	Wife: Tjeset; Son: Khuwiwer; Daughter: Akh, Senedjemef
G 4611 (=LG 50)	Stone mastaba	Niuty	Secretary of the Toilet-house, Keeper of oils of the Great House, Boundary official of (the district) ‘Star of Horus Foremost of Heaven’, etc.	End of Dyn. 5 or later.	
G 4620	Stone mastaba	Kanefer	royal document scribe	Dyn. 5	
G 4630	Stone mastaba	Medunefer	Chief lector-priest, Scribe of divine books, sma-priest of Anubis, etc.	Dyn. 5	Wife: Nebuka and Tjentet; Sons: Seneb, Kairef, Ankhires and Dedef?. Grandson: Medunefer (son of Ankhires)
G 4631	Stone mastaba	Nensedjerkai	King's acquaintance, Priestess of Hathor, Priestess of Neith	Dyn 5.	
G 4640	Stone mastaba	Anonymous		Middle or late Dynasty 4	Reserve head found in tomb.
G 4646	Stone mastaba	Ity	Overseer of the department of tenants of the Great House, Companion of the house, etc.	Late Dyn. 6	
G 4650	Stone mastaba	Princess Iabtet	King's daughter of his body, his beloved	Middle or late Dyn. 4	Kapunisut Kai (G 4651 and G 1741) and his family are mentioned in tomb.
G 4651	Stone mastaba	Kapunesut Kai	Overseer of ka-servants, Overseer of the houses of the King's children, Judge and Scribe of the crews, etc.	Early to middle Dyn. 5	Wife: Wehetka; Sons: Hesyre, Tjenti and Nisukhu; Daughters: Hepmaat, Neferi, and Nefretankh.
G 4710 (LG 49)	Stone mastaba	Setju	Director of the Palace, Secretary of the Toilet-house, Master of the largesse in the Mansion of Life, etc.	5th dynasty (Possibly Djedkare Isesi)	Wife: Nebuhetep; Son: Setju, Daughter: Ptahhepka
G 4712	Stone mastaba	Queen Nimaathap	Seer of Horus and Seth, great one of the hetes-scepter	5th dynasty	Her titles indicate she was a queen, but her husband is not known.
G 4714 (LG 48)	Stone mastaba	Princess Neferhetepes	King's daughter of his body	5th dynasty	
G 4750	Stone mastaba	Akhi	Overseer of all works of the King, Overseer of the Two Treasuries, Overseer of the royal granaries, etc.	4th dynasty (Menkaure)	
G 4761	Stone mastaba	Nefer I	Prophet of Horus mDdw (Khufu), steward, overseer of ka-priests, etc.	End of Dyn. 5 or Dyn 6	Parents (probably), Kakhent and Thetit; Wife, Hetepmaet; Son: Setka
G 4811 + 4812	Stone mastaba	Irankhptah	Overseer of the wabt, Overseer of craftsmen of the Great House, Overseer of works of the King	Late Dyn. 5 or Dyn 6	
G 4840	Stone mastaba	Princess Wenshet	King's daughter of his body, Prophetess of Neith North-of-the-Wall and of Hathor Mistress-of-the-Sycamore.	Middle or late Dyn.4	Daughters: Thenteti and Wehemnefert
G 4911	Rubble mastaba	Ankhtef	oyal acquaintance, royal wab-priest, priest of Khufu	5th–6th dynasty	
G 4920 (LG 47)	Stone mastaba	Tjenty	Director of the Palace, Secretary of the Toilet-house, Chief of bat, etc.	Early Dyn. 5 or later.	
G 4940 (LG 45)	Stone mastaba	Seshemnefer I	Royal chamberlain, One belonging to the estate ‘Mansion of Har-kheper Prophet of Heket, Judge and Boundary official, etc.	Time of Userkaf–Neferirkare	Wife, Amendjefas; Children: Pehenptah (tomb G 5280) and Raawer (tomb, probably, G 5270)
G 4941	Stone mastaba	Ptahiufni	Tenant of the Pyramid of Pepy I, Carpenter of the Great Dockyard, Honoured by Hardjedef, etc.	Dyn. 6	
G 4970	Stone mastaba	Nesutnefer	Overseer of strongholds of the Heliopolitan-East nome, Leader of the land of the Thinite and Aphroditopolite nomes, Prophet of the statue (of Khephren), etc.	Early or middle Dyn. 5	Wife: Khentetka called Khent; Sons: Kawedj'ankh and Rudju

== Cemetery G 5000 ==
Tomb number	Type	Name of owner	Title owner	Time Period	Comments
G 5030 (LG 46)	Stone-Mastaba			Late 4th or 5th dynasty	
G 5032	Stone-Mastaba	Redines and his wife Meritites	King's wab-priest, Scribe.	6th dynasty	
G 5040	Stone-Mastaba	Kaemqed	King's wab-priest, etc.	Late 5th or 6th dynasty	
G 5080 (= G2200)	Stone-Mastaba	Seshemnefer II	Overseer of scribes of the royal documents, Overseer of all works of the King, etc.	5th dynasty	
G 5110 (LG 44)	Stone-Mastaba	Duaenre	Vizier	4th dynasty (Khafre to Menkaure)	Son of Pharaoh Khafre
G 5150 (LG 36)	Stone-Mastaba	Seshat-hetep called Heti and his wife Meritites	King's son of his body, Overseer of all works of the King, Greatest of the Ten of Upper Egypt, etc.	Early 5th dynasty	
G 5170	Stone-Mastaba	Seshemnefer III	King's son of his body, Chief Justice and Vizier, etc.	5th Dynastie (Isesi)	Son of Seshemnefer (II) and Henutsen (tomb G 5080).
G 5210 (LG 43)	Stone-Mastaba	Khemten	Steward who served Prince Kawab, Princess (Queen) Hetepheres II, and Queen Meresankh III, and perhaps Prince Duaenre.	4th dynasty (Khufu and later)	
G 5230 (LG 40)	Stone-Mastaba	Babaef II	Vizier	Late 4th and early 5th dynasty	Son of Duaenre
G 5270	Stone-Mastaba	Rawer	Scribe of the royal documents, etc.	Mid 5th dynasty	
G 5280	Stone-Mastaba	Pehenptah	Scribe of the royal documents, etc.	Mid 5th dynasty	Probably son of Seshemnefer [I] and Amendjefas (tomb G 4940).
G 5290	Stone-Mastaba	Hetepniptah		Mid 5th dynasty or later	
G 5330 (LG 41)	Stone-Mastaba	Ihy	Overseer of the Great Court, Overseer of commissions in the whole country, etc.	6th dynasty	
G 5332 (LG 39)	Stone-Mastaba			5th or 6th dynasty	
G 5340 (LG 37)	Stone-Mastaba	Kasewedja	Overseer of commissions, Director of interpreters, Herdsman of the White Bull, etc.	Mid 5th dynasty	Possibly a son of Kanufer and Shepsetkau (tomb G 2150).
G 5350	Stone-Mastaba			5th or 6th dynasty	
G 5370 (LG 31)	Stone-Mastaba	Djaty	Greatest of the Ten of Upper Egypt, Overseer of all works of the King.	5th dynasty (Neferirkare or later)	
G 5470 (LG 32)	Stone-Mastaba	Rawer II	Judge and Boundary official, Secretary of the secret judgement of the Great Court, etc.	Late 5th dynasty	
G 5480 (LG 29)	Stone-Mastaba	Heti	Judge and Overseer of scribes, etc.	Late 5th or 6th dynasty	
G 5482	Stone-Mastaba			5th or 6th dynasty	
G 5520(LG 28)	Stone-Mastaba	Seankhenptah		Late 5th or 6th dynasty	
G 5550	Stone-Mastaba	Nefer called Idu and his wife Hemetre	Chief Justice and Vizier, etc.	Early 6th dynasty	
G 5560 (LG 35)	Stone-Mastaba	Kakherptah called Fetekta	Overseer of the Memphite and Letopolite nomes, etc.	Early 6th dynasty	

== Junker Cemetery East ==
This cemetery was excavated by Hermann Junker for the Akademie der Wissenschaften in Vienna, Pelizaeus-Museum Hildesheim and University of Leipzig Expedition. The tombs are not numbered and are named after their owner.

Tomb number	Type	Name of owner	Title owner	Time Period	Comments
		Niankh-hathor	Prophetess of Hathor Mistress-of-the-Deserts	Late Old Kingdom.	The tomb may belong to her son Ineb, who was an inspector of carpenters of the palace
		Sensen and his wife Pepi	Overseer of the is-chamber	Late Old Kingdom.	Pepi was a Prophetess of Hathor
		Meruka and his wife Nedjetempet	Elder of the Hall, King's wab-priest, Prophet of Khufu, etc.	6th dynasty	Mereruka's father Kakherptah is also mentioned. He also holds the title Elder of the Hall. Two sons named Ihiemsaf and Ptahshepses are mentioned in a scene on the wall of the tomb.
		Iuf and his wife Meri	Director of tomb-makers	5th or 6th dynasty	A double-statue of Iuf and his wife was discovered in the serdab. It is now in the Cairo Museum (Cairo JE 49691).
		Nikaukhnum and Neferesris	Royal acquaintance	5th or 6th dynasty	
		Khenu		6th dynasty	Appears on the lintel with four children: his sons Mereri, Bebi and Nekhef, and a daughter Hemi.
		Ibinedjem	palace attendant	6th dynasty	An offering basin (Hildesheim 3043) inscribed for Ibinedjem was found in the mastabas. An uninscribed statue found in the tomb may also belong to him.
		Khuy	Overseer of palace attendants of the Great House	6th dynasty	
		Neferen	Overseer of corn-measurers, of the store-room, and of female weavers, etc.	6th dynasty	His name is found on the chapel entrance lintel (Hildesheim 5) and a false door (Leipzig 3135).
		Weri	Inspector of the ka-priests, One belonging to the Great Estate, Scribe of the Treasury	6th dynasty	Probably the son of Nefer I (owner of G 4761)
		Khnemu and his wife Hathorwer	ka-priest, One belonging to the Great Estate.	6th dynasty	Sons named Ihyemsaf, Neferhau, Khufunefer, Neferwednet and daughters Iyti and Khuitenhor are named in a chapel relief.
		User	Overseer of ka-priests, etc.	late 5th dynasty	Son of a woman named Henutsen who is mentioned on the chapel entrance lintel.
		Shepsi and his wife Neferwates	Inspector of builders	6th dynasty	The false door mentions two sons named Werkaptah and Suk and three daughters named Kaemmerut, Djefaibka and Hui respectively.
		Hesy and his wife Nebtip	Director of embalmers of the Great House, Prophet of Duamutef	6th dynasty	
		Maathep ?		6th dynasty	An offering table of Maathep was found near the false door. She may be the wife of the actual owner of the tomb.
		Neferihi	ka-priest	6th dynasty	

== Steindorff Cemetery ==
This cemetery contains mostly brick-built mastabas. The cemetery was excavated by Georg Steindorff for the University of Leipzig and Pelizaeus Expedition (1903–07). Several of the tombs were later excavated by Hermann Junker.

Tomb number	Type	Name of owner	Title owner	Time Period	Comments
D 1	Mud-brick mastaba	Unknown		5th or 6th dynasty	
D 4	Stone-built mastaba	Washptah and his wife Khenu	Inspector of prophets of Hathor	5th or 6th dynasty	
D 9	Stone-built mastaba	Rahotep ?		5th or 6th dynasty	The name of the Rahotep was found on an offering table.
D 12	Stone-built mastaba complex	Kherhat and his wife Rudjka		5th dynasty	A statue-group showing Kheriket with wife and daughters Senitites and Hehi was found. A son is also shown but the name is not legible. Now in the Hildesheim Museum.
D 14	Stone-built mastaba	Irkaptah	Overseer of the Great Estate	5th or 6th dynasty	Name found on a lintel.
D 15	Stone-built mastaba	Khufu[..] ?	King's wab-priest	5th or 6th dynasty	Name found on a drum.
D 15B	Mud-brick mastaba	Mereru	Overseer of the House of weaving women	5th or 6th dynasty	
D 19	Mud-brick mastaba	Werbaure	Overseer of commissions of palace attendants of the Great House	5th or 6th dynasty	A lintel from this tomb is now in the Hildesheim Museum.
D 20	Stone+Brick-built mastaba	Tepemankh	Royal acquaintance, overseer of the department of palace attendants of the Great House	5th or 6th dynasty	
D 23	Stone+Brick-built mastaba	Pepi		5th dynasty	A statue-group was found depicting Pepi and two men called Rashepses. It is not known if these men depict a husband and a son, two sons, or even one son at different ages. The statue is now in the Hildesheim Museum (Hildesheim 17).
D 29	Stone+Brick-built mastaba	Unknown		5th or 6th dynasty	A statuette of a woman grinding corn was found in the tomb. It is presently in the Leipzig Museum (Inv. 2567).
D 30	Mud-brick mastaba	Kau	Royal wab-priest, priest of Khufu, inspector of ka-priests, carpenter of the palace	th or 6th dynasty	
D 32+32A	Stone-built mastaba	Memi and Neferherenptah	Both King's wab-priest	5th dynasty	A seated statue inscribed for Memi was found (Leipzig 2560) as well as a limestone standing statue (Hildesheim 2). The name of Neferherenptah is found on the south chapel entrance lintel, a drum lintel, and doorjambs.
D 37	Stone-built mastaba	Raherka and his wife Meresankh	Inspector of scribes, Judge and Overseer of scribes	4th or 5th dynasty	The double statue of Raherka and Meresankh probably comes from this tomb.
D 38 (G 2230)	Stone-built mastaba	Unknown		4th or 5th dynasty	A reserve head now in the Cairo Museum (JE 47838) probably comes from this tomb.
D 39/40	Stone-built mastaba	Djasha	royal wab-priest, priest of the king's mother	5th dynasty	The tomb contained three seated statues (Leipzig 2561, Cairo JE 37820, Cairo JE 37825) inscribed for Djasha. One of the statues (Leipzig 2561 identifies Djasha as the priest of the king's mother).
D 42	Mud-brick mastaba	Iyni	Royal acquaintance	5th or 6th dynasty	
D 51	Stone+Brick-built mastaba	Nimaatptah and his wife Intkaes	Royal acquaintance, inspector of ka-priests, overseer of the ten of the Great Estate	5th or 6th dynasty	
D 59	Stone+Brick-built mastaba	Nesutnefer and his wife Senet	ka-priest	5th or 6th dynasty	
D 61	Stone-built mastaba	Irkaptah and his wife Neferhetepes	Inspector of the wabet of the necropolis	5th or 6th dynasty	A limestone standing statue (Hildesheim 417) inscribed for Irkaptah was found in the tomb.
D 80 + 80A	Stone-built mastaba complex	Sebehnef	Royal acquaintance, inspector of craftsmen	5th or 6th dynasty	A limestone seated statue (Hildesheim 419) inscribed for Sebehnef was found in the serdab. A statue of the royal acquaintance Tjentet may depict his wife. A limestone standing statue (Hildesheim 420) depicting a man named Maatre may be Sebehnef's son.
D 82 + 82A	Stone-built mastaba	Ihy	Judge and Inspector of tenants of the Great House	5th or 6th dynasty	
D 116	Stone-built mastaba	Seshemu and his wife Nefret	Overseer of the crew of rowers	5th or 6th dynasty	
D 117	Stone-built mastaba	Wehemka and his wife Hetepibes Ipi	royal acquaintance, scribe of the library, scribe of recruits, steward	Early 5th dynasty	Son of Iti and Djefatsen, who are depicted in the tomb. Wehemka also appears in a chapel relief in the tomb of Kaninisut I (G 2155)
D 200	Stone-built mastaba	Redief	Inspector of grain measurers of the estates	6th dynasty	
D 201	Stone+Brick-built mastaba	Ankhemtjenenet called Ineb and his wife Khenit	Juridical inspector of scribes, secretary of judgements	5th or 6th dynasty	Ankhemtjenenet was the son of Senenu (G 2032)
D 202	Stone-built mastaba	Niankh-Khufu ?		5th or 6th dynasty	Niankh-Khufu's name appears on a lintel.
D 203	Stone-built mastaba	Nefer and Itisen	Nefer: Overseer of barbers Itisen: Overseer of the tjaw of the Great Bark	5th or 6th dynasty	The names of nefer and Itisen were found on a false door.
D 205	Mud-brick mastaba	Iyni and his wife Neferkaus		5th or 6th dynasty	A standing pair statue (Cairo JE 36271) inscribed for Iyni and Neferkaus was found between D 204 and 205.
D 207	Mud-brick mastaba	Tjy and his wife Intkaes	Royal acquaintance, inspector of craftsmen, overseer of craftsmen of the is-chamber of the wabet	5th or 6th dynasty	Intkaes was a priestess of Hathor and a priestess of Neith.
D 208	Mud-brick mastaba	Neferihy	Royal acquaintance, overseer of messengers (?) of the tomb-makers, overseer of tomb-makers	5th or 6th dynasty	Neferihy's son Kai is mentioned on a drum.
D 211	Stone-built mastaba	Hetepi	King's wab-priest.	6th dynasty	A wooden seated statue (Hildesheim 1572) of Hetepi was found in the burial chamber of shaft 5.
D 213	Stone-built mastaba	Ruwedjib and his wife Tjentet	Prophet of Khufu, King's wab-priest	5th or 6th dynasty	
D 215	Mud-brick mastaba	Imhotep and his wife Ankh-hathor	Royal acquaintance, royal assistant leather-worker	5th or 6th dynasty	A limestone pair statue (Hildesheim 1) of Imhetep and his wife Ankhhathor was found in the serdab of the tomb.
D 220	Stone-built mastaba	Tjesi and his wife Mehibhathor	Royal acquaintance, overseer of craftsmen	5th or 6th dynasty	
D 221		Iteti		5th or 6th dynasty	The exact location of the tomb is not known.

== See also ==
- Giza East Field
