= Dwarfs and pygmies in ancient Egypt =

Dwarf in hieroglyphs
- Deneg / Daneg / Dag dng/dʾng/dʾg Dwarf / Small person / Pygmy
d A g

In ancient Egypt, especially during the Early Dynastic and Old Kingdom periods, dwarfs and pygmies were seen as people with celestial gifts. They were treated with considerable respect and could enjoy high social positions. During the 1st Dynasty (c. 3150–2900 BC), dwarfs served and worked directly for the king and royal household, and a number have been found buried in subsidiary tombs around those of the kings. In fact, the rather high proportion of dwarfs in the royal cemeteries of the 1st Dynasty suggests some may have been brought into Egypt from elsewhere.

Later, in the Old Kingdom (c. 2680–2180 BC), dwarfs were employed as jewellers, tailors, cup-bearers and zookeepers, could found families or be brought into one. Pygmies were employed as dancers for special occasions and religious festivals. The social position of dwarfs seems to have declined after the Old Kingdom. By the time of the New Kingdom (c. 1550–1070 BC) they were depicted in ridiculing ways, and while the papyrus "The wise doctrine of Amenemope, son of Kanakht" asks people not to treat them badly, this has concluded that they were likely subject to abuse.

In Egyptian art, dwarfs and pygmies are depicted realistically which enables their identification as cases of nanism. The ancient Egyptians had three words and special hieroglyphs for dwarfs and revered several dwarf deities, in particular Bes, the god of the household and birth, and two dwarf forms of Ptah.

== Terms and depictions ==
=== Hieroglyphic writing ===
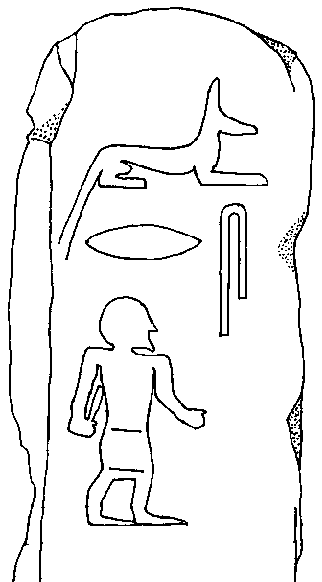
Tomb stele of the court dwarf Ser-Inpw (1st dynasty); origin: Abydos

The ancient Egyptians used three terms to describe peoples with short stature: the first of these was Deneg, Daneg or Dag (depending on different transcriptions), which simply means "little human", "dwarf" and/or "pygmy". The Egyptian hieroglyphs used for these words could be combined with the determinative of a dwarf, alternatively the determinative was used alone. Stelae of the 1st Dynasty show only the determinative, implying that the determinative itself was read Deneg, Daneg or Dag and with the same meaning. In later times, these words were often combined with further determinatives such as the one for "clothes/fashion" (Gardiner sign S38), literally describing a "fashion dwarf" (Egyptian Daneg-seret); or with the determinative of a dancer (Gardiner sign A32) for a "dancing dwarf" (Egyptian Daneg-ibaw). During the Middle Kingdom period, two new words concerning dwarfs and pygmies appeared: Nemw, meaning "malformed one" pointing to the genetic origin of Egyptian dwarfs as persons born with achondroplasia; and Hewa meaning "shepherd" or "cattle drover".

=== Depictions ===
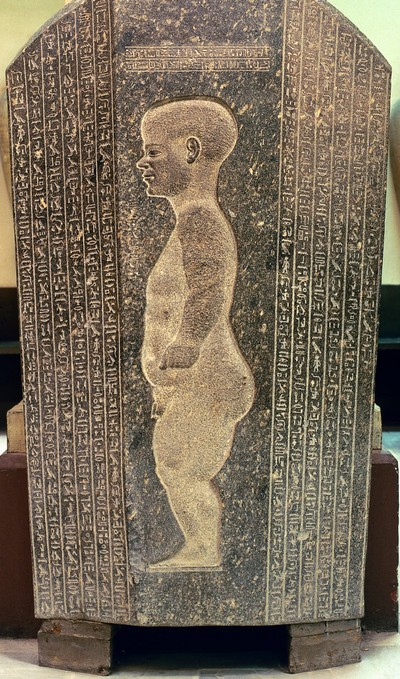
The sarcophagus lid from the Late Period (713-332 BCE) belonged to a dancer Dejahir

The typical depiction of a dwarf in Egyptian art is realistic, showing a normally grown torso and head, but visibly shortened and slightly bent arms and legs. These proportions point to achondroplasia and hypochondroplasia as the conditions responsible for the dwarfism of the individual. Yet, there are also reliefs of small peoples with normal body proportions and it remains unclear if these representations show real pygmies or if these people are represented small in order to reflect their low rank or accentuate the main scene of the relief.

The earliest known depictions of dwarfs in Egypt date to the early 1st Dynasty (c. 3100 – c. 2890 BC) and were found in the royal cemetery at Abydos. These are reliefs carved on private stelae placed in subsidiary tombs around that of the king. All surviving stelae are damaged and weathered, but the represented dwarfs can be seen to wear gold collars, fine linen skirts and carry insignia such as staffs of office and cloth seals, typical for high-ranking officials and priests. Depictions of dwarfs also appear in black-ink inscriptions on ceramics and earthen beer jugs. In addition, several ivory figurines showing male and female dwarfs were uncovered in Abydos. Again, many of these figurines show the dwarfs wearing gold collars, fine linen skirts and even fine stepped dreadlock wigs. Some of the female figurines are shown in a gesture typical for the birth in standing position and others clearly depict a pregnant woman. It is believed that these special figurines of female dwarfs were good luck charms for pregnant women intended to draw luck for the birth of healthy children.

== Origins ==
The proportion of dwarfs in the royal cemetery in Abydos is much larger than in a normal population. Thus, it is possible that some of these dwarfs were bought from elsewhere - or even came to Egypt voluntarily as a land where they could expect to rise to a high social status. In support for this hypothesis, Hermann Junker, Jacques Jean Clére and Hans Felix Wolf point to the Egyptian word Isww, meaning "I have bought (this)", and which often occurs in connection with dwarfs. However, it remains unclear if most of the dwarfs and pygmies were bought or if they "rented" themselves to institutions such as temples, shrines and even the pharaoh's court. Especially during the Early Dynastic Period (c. 3100–2680 BC) and Old Kingdom (c. 2680–2180 BC), it was common in upper-class households that important sums of some kind were paid whenever dwarfs performed public dances or other duties. Similarly, valuables were exchanged whenever dwarfs and pygmies switched their employer or there was a change of the head of the house. Evidently, in rare cases, nanism would appear naturally within a healthy, normally grown family. Thus not all dwarfs and pygmies were inevitably gained by bestowal or acquisition.

== Differentiations ==
The Ancient Egyptians differentiated between "real" (genetic) dwarfs and pygmies, who arrived in Egypt, presumably as valuably exotic captives, from (again presumably) those areas of west Africa where members of this ethnic group still live (an enormous distance from the pharaonic kingdom, particularly given the lack of modern communications), though a possible origin for the dancing pygmies might have been modern day Sudan or Ethiopia (if they were formerly more widespread). Pygmies were exclusively hired on very special occasions for dancing and for acrobatic performances at temples and shrines. Dwarfs instead, were exclusively hired for highly skilled craftings and artistic duties. However, modern Egyptologists admonish for caution, the ancient Egyptian did not differ between dwarfs and pygmies to discriminate them, they simply chose their activities according to their skills.

== Social ranks and careers ==
=== Social ranks ===
Dwarfs were treated with considerable respect in Ancient Egyptian society, notably during the Early Dynastic and Old Kingdom periods. Their natural nanism was seen as a celestial gift, and discrimination and social exclusion seem to have been unknown to the Egyptians. In most cases in which dwarfs were brought into a new family, they seem to have been accepted at once as full-fledged members. They were assigned special, exclusive duties, which were normally performed by the highest-ranked officials, such as priests and treasurers. Even in many royal households, next to the king, dwarfs were allowed to serve and work. The unusually high ranks and social positions that dwarfs enjoyed explain, for example, their important presence in subsidiary tombs around those of the 1st Dynasty pharaohs. These subsidiary tombs were reserved for the direct and most loyal servants of the ruler. To be allowed to be buried so close to the king shows how respected dwarfs were at that time.

In the 6th Dynasty, during the reign of king Pepi II (2284–2184 BC), we know of a letter written by the then young king and addressed to his high official and prince Harkhuf who was sent to Elephantine in order to ask about the condition and whereabouts of a "dancing dwarf" (Egyptian Daneg ibaw). Harkhuf was ordered to bring the dwarf, which originated from the fabled Punt, to the palace of the king healthy and unharmed, no matter what the cost. The appointed passage includes that the king "desires to see the dwarf even more than to receive the precious gifts from Punt". The letter also reveals that before this event, already several dwarfs were brought from Punt into the royal household.

=== Family founding ===
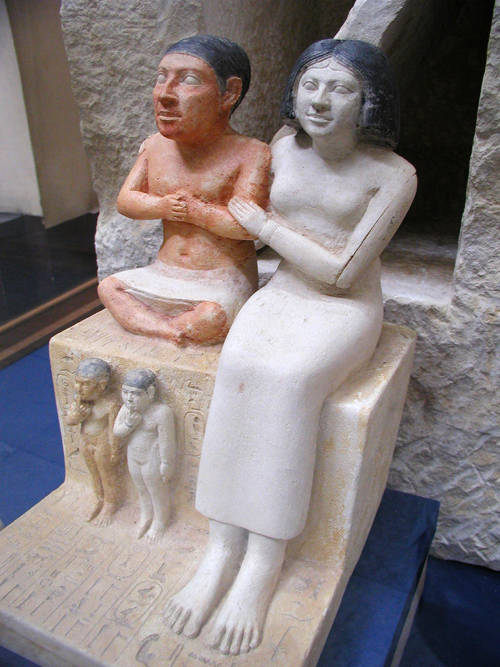
Statue of the dwarf Seneb, his wife and children, 4th or 5th dynasty

The best-known case of nanism in ancient Egypt is that of the high official Seneb, as a finely carved statue-group of the dwarf and his family has survived in excellent preservation. Seneb worked during the late 4th Dynasty (c. 2613–2494 BC) or early 5th Dynasty (c. 2498–2345 BC), most possibly under king Shepseskaf and his successors. Seneb was married to a normally grown woman named Senet-ites. He had two daughters named Awib-en-Khufu and Semeret-Radjedef and one son named Ankh-ima-Radjedef, all of whom are represented as of normal stature. This shows that it was accepted that dwarfs might have families and healthy children. Note that the two children shown in front of Seneb's seat in the accompanying illustration are in the position where the legs of a 'normal' statue would be represented, thus lessening - though not concealing - his abnormal appearance. Because Seneb's father was normally grown, Seneb's case also proves that not all dwarfs were brought from foreign countries, nanism occasionally occurring - as would be expected from modern experience - within Egyptian families. In other cases, where persons also having short stature are depicted as servants of other dwarfs, it is possible that they were part of the same family. However, this remains a matter for conjecture, as it was not uncommon during the Old Kingdom period, that artists depicted the same person multiple times in one scene. They did this to show that the main character performed several duties at the same time.

=== Careers ===
As already mentioned, dwarfs were allowed to have several high ranked jobs and could move up the ranks during their career. Old Kingdom reliefs depict dwarfs performing mainly easy, rather creative jobs, because their shortened and fragile stature did not allow for hard or dangerous physical work. Unsurprisingly then dwarfs mainly worked as jewelers, tailors, cup-bearers and even as zookeepers. As in other periods, dwarfs were particularly valued as treasurers or jewellers, as their very distinctive appearance would make any dishonest dealings on their part that much more difficult to get away with.

Zoo-keeping seems in fact, in the surviving evidence, the most common work performed by dwarfs. Royal zookeepers mostly took care of the king's pets such as hunting dogs, domestic cats and guenons. This may be because these animals were very easy to tame and would not become a danger to the dwarfs. A unique relief from the mastaba of the high official Nyankhnesw (6th Dynasty) shows a dwarf taking a leopard for a walk. In another tomb (that of the high official Nofer, also of the 6th Dynasty), one relief shows a dwarf and his guenon while the little ape pilfers grapes from a fruit basket and plays with his cord. Further Old Kingdom reliefs suggest that guenons literally assisted their keepers: in the tomb of Kaaper a unique relief depicts a dwarf and his guenon, as they both specify the clock for a pair of musicians. In contrast, depictions of dwarfs working themselves as musicians are very rare.

Old Kingdom inscriptions reveal that dwarfs had the chance to be promoted in their professions and offices. High rank titles such as ″overseer of the dwarfs in the house-of-clothes″ and ″overseer of the goldsmiths″, and honorary titles such as ″friend of the king″, ″beloved of the king″ and ″head of the palace″ prove that dwarfs were socially treated on par with normally grown people. However, it remains unclear whether dwarfs were allowed to perform duties in temple services and rituals. The few reliefs showing dwarfs involved in feasts such as the Hathor feast and the Heb Sed allow no secure evaluation because the inscriptions give the names of the dwarfs, but do not explain their exact activity.

== Later periods ==
In later periods, such as the Middle Kingdom (c. 2055–1710 BC) and the New Kingdom (c. 1550–1070 BC) the special respect shown to dwarfs seems to have lessened. Depictions of dwarfs from later periods show them in progressively more ridiculing ways. An Egyptian papyrus dating to the Ramesside era called "The wise doctrine of Amenemope, son of Kanakht" (papyrus B.M. 10474) includes appeals to not mistreat dwarfs and other handicapped people. Scholars and historians evaluate Amenemope's humane doctrines as a public appeal against upcoming moral decay within Egyptian society.

== Dwarf deities ==
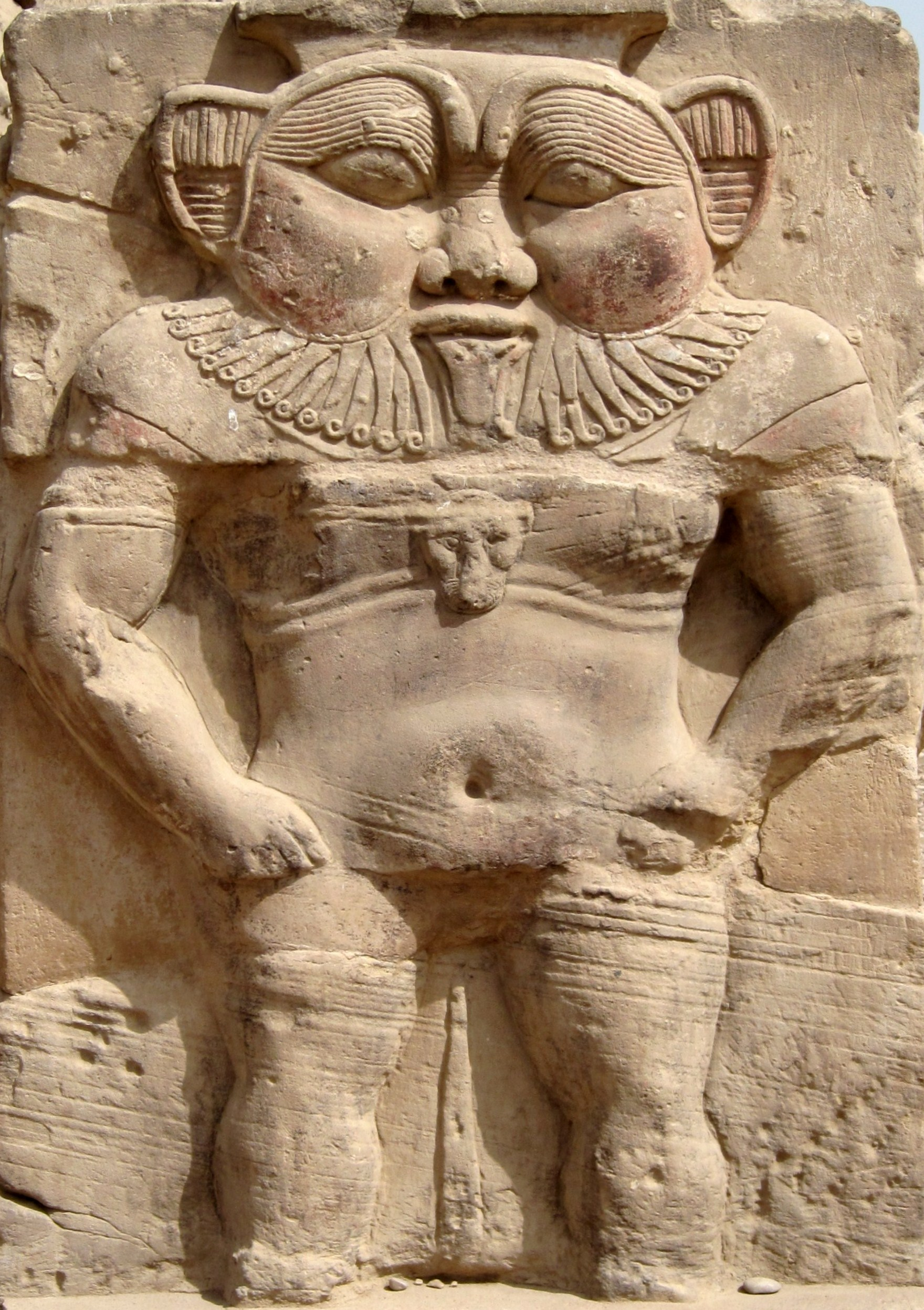
The dwarf deity Bes as depicted on a relief at Dendera

In Ancient Egypt, peoples worshipped several dwarf deities, the most important of which was Bes. His cult is archaeologically attested since the 12th Dynasty (c. 1991–1802 BC). The cult is thought to have originated in Nubia, modern day Sudan. Bes was the god of dreams, luck, dancing, and he was the protector of the household and its belongings. He was also a god of birth and was worshipped in birth houses alongside the goddess Heqet. Bes is always depicted with a normal torso and head, shortened legs and arms and with the ears of a lion. His most unmistakable feature is his frontal depiction, rather rare in Ancient Egypt, making Bes particularly recognizable (and probably pointing to a foreign origin for his cult).

A further deity with nanism, but rarely depicted, was Ptah-Pahtaka ("Ptah, the strong"). He was worshipped as a special form of Ptah, the god of art, crafts and creativity. Another form of Ptah that was also depicted as a dwarf was Ptah-segem-panem ("Ptah, the listener"). The deity Thoth, god of time, knowledge, mathematics and the moon, was sometimes depicted as a baboon with the head of a human. This could have been an allusion to dwarfs.

== Egyptian dwarfs known by their names ==
Egyptian dwarfs which became known by their names thanks to their tomb stela, reliefs and/or statues include: Nefer, Ser-Inpw, Hedju (all three of 1st dynasty), Ny-ankh-Djedefre (4th dynasty) and Seneb (late 4th or early 5th dynasty).
