= Medunefer (Giza G 4630) =

Ancient Egyptian priest

Medunufer
- Burial place: Giza, Giza Governorate, Egypt
- Occupation: Priest
- Years active: c. 2400 BC, Fifth Dynasty
- Children: Ankhires, Seneb, Kairef, Medunefer

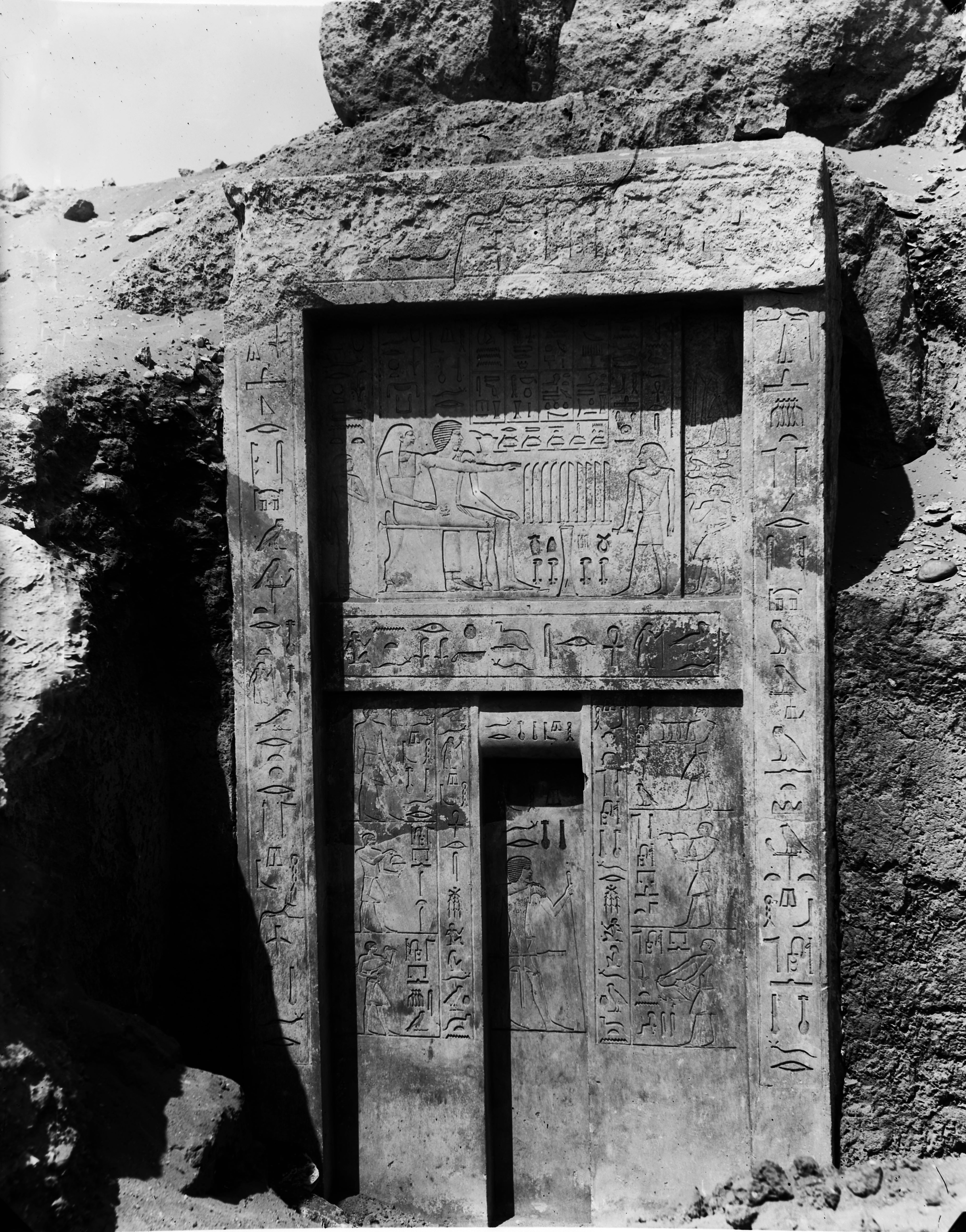
False-door from the mastaba of Medunefer (Cairo EMC CG 57123), during Schiaparelli's excavations, 1903.

Medunufer, also transcribed Medunefer (fl. c. 2400 BC), was an ancient Egyptian priest who lived in the Old Kingdom, during the Fifth Dynasty. Medunefer is only known from his mastaba in Giza (Giza G 4630), excavated by Ernesto Schiaparelli in 1903 and later again by George Reisner around 1913-1914.

Medunefer's titles include lector priest, scribe of divine books and sema-priest of Anubis.

== Tomb ==
The tomb G 4630 is a stone mastaba in the Western Cemetery of Giza. The tomb had an added mudbrick chapel from which came two limestone false doors, the southern one belonging to Medunefer and the northern one to his son Ankhires. The offering room with the two false doors was part of a larger mud-brick cult complex, which also enclosed the later-added mastaba G 4631. The cult building included an entrance room measuring 3.65 × 3.35 m, an offering room measuring 3.9 × 1.3 m, and a narrow vaulted corridor measuring 14.9 × 0.8 m.

The Museo Egizio photo archive preserves a set of eight images of the mastaba and its finds. The photographs include the two false doors, the false door of Medunefer, the second false door, and the covered corridor of the mastaba.

== Finds ==
In Medunufer's stone-built mastaba tomb was found his false door, now in the Egyptian Museum, Cairo, CG No. 57123, providing his name and titles. On the false door are mentioned two wives, Nubka and Tjenetet, and several children are depicted. His son Ankhires reports that he made the false door for his father. There is a short dedicatory statement on the false door, in which the eldest son Ankhires says that he made the monument for his father.

Within the mastaba, Ankhires had also his own false door, now in the Egyptian Museum, Cairo, CG No. 57189. This second false door was dedicated to Ankhires by his son Medunefer. Ankhires himself had several titles, including scribe of divine books, sema-priest of Anubis and lector priest.

The two false doors are documented together on plate E00309 in the Museo Egizio photo archive. The false door of Medunefer is documented on plates C03318 and E00306, while the second false door is documented on plate C01855. Pottery from burial shaft G 4630 A was registered in Reisner and Smith's publication with field numbers beginning 13-12 and 14-1.

Images from Archivio fotografico Museo Egizio, Turin

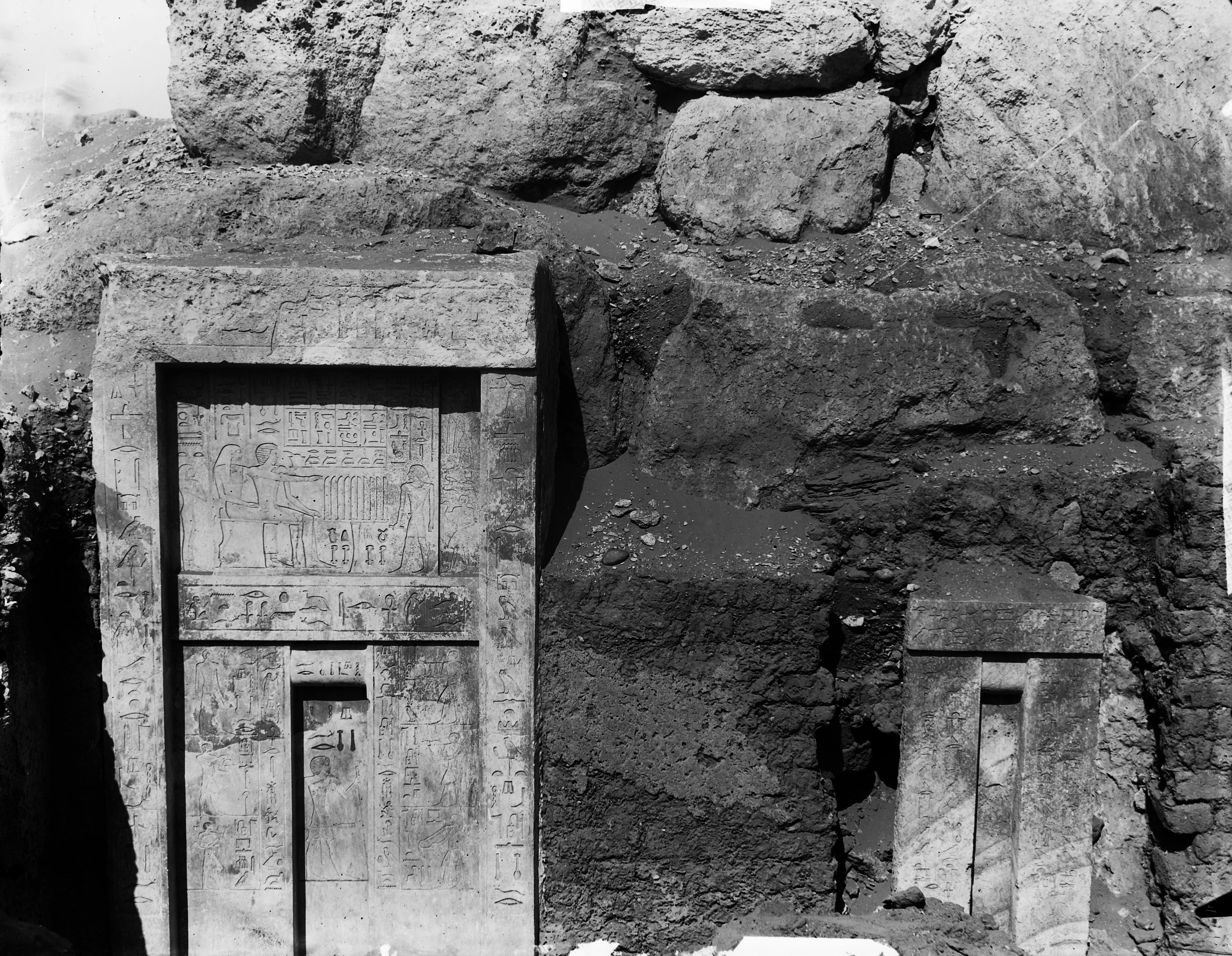
The two false-doors from the mastaba of Medunefer, Cairo EMC CG 57123 and Cairo EMC CG 57189, during Schiaparelli's excavations, 1903.

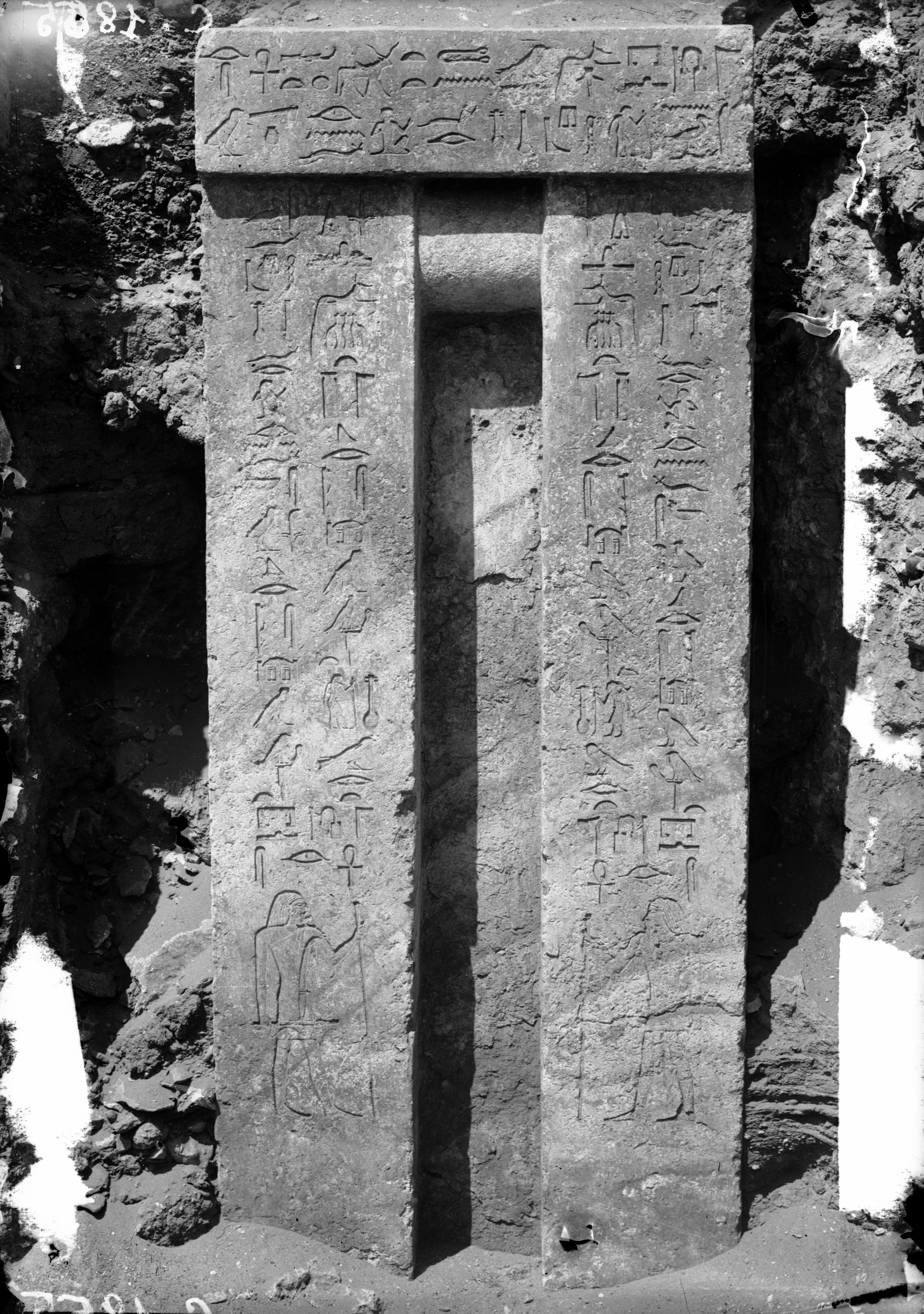
Second false-door from the mastaba of Medunefer, belonging to Ankhires and dedicated by his son Medunefer, Cairo EMC CG 57189, during Schiaparelli's excavations, 1903.

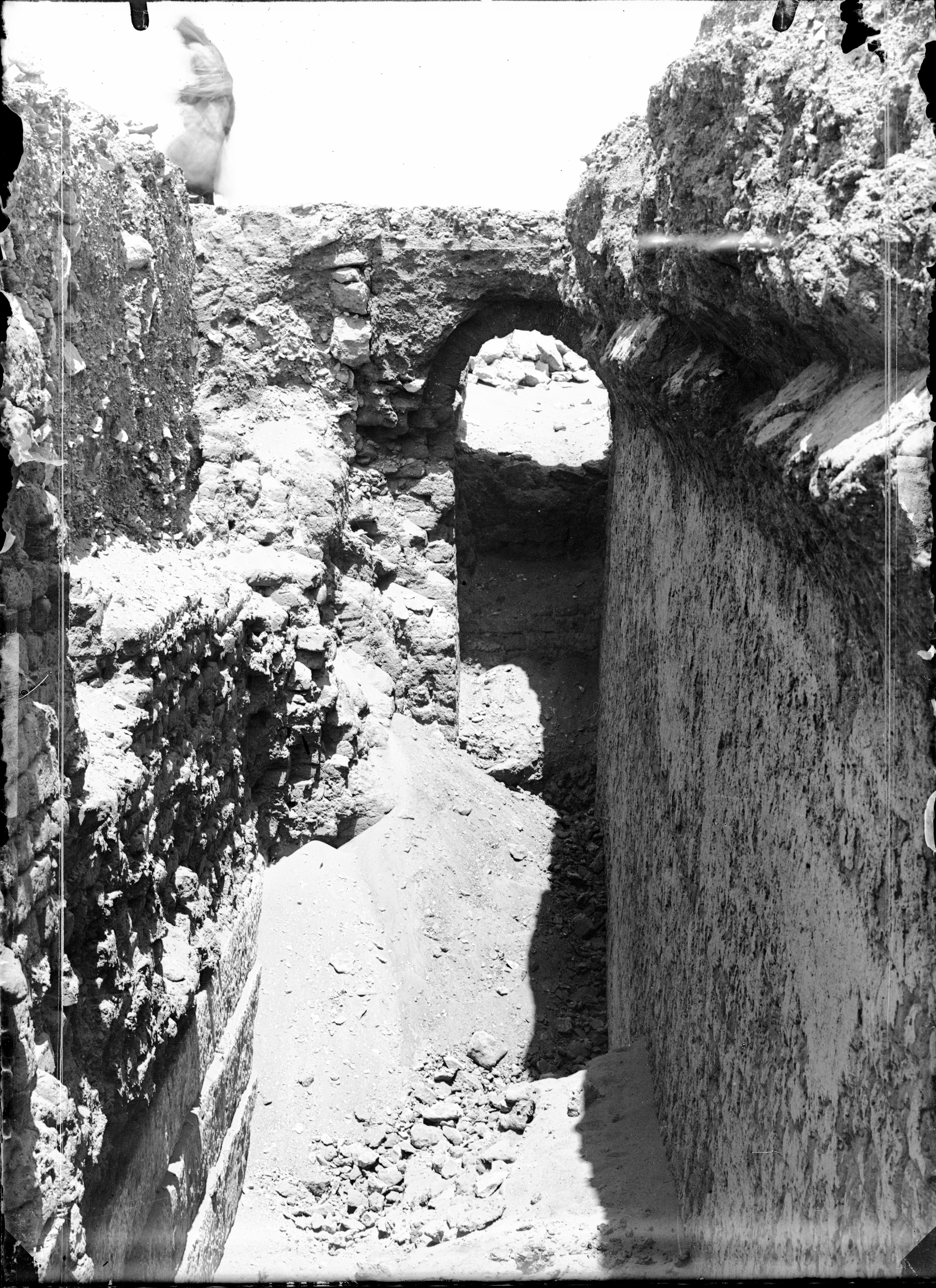
Mastaba of Medunefer: covered corridor during Schiaparelli's excavations, 1903.

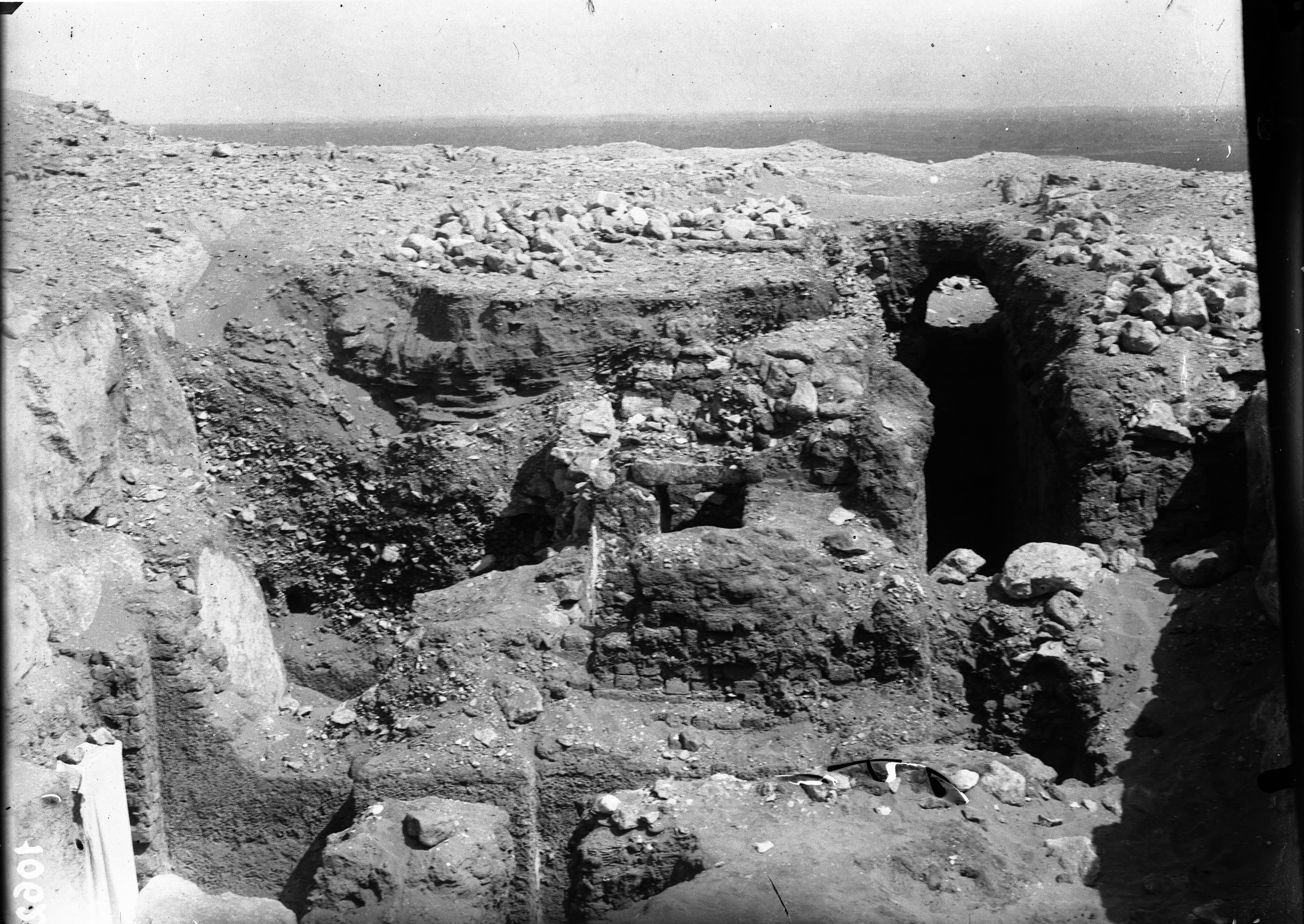
Mastaba of Medunefer: covered corridor during Schiaparelli's excavations, 1903.

== Sources ==
- Curto, Silvio (1963). Gli Scavi Italiani a el-Ghiza (1903) (PDF) (in Italian). Rome: Centro per le Antichità e la Storia dell'Arte del Vicino Oriente.
- D'Itria, Elena; Ferrandino, Gilda (2022). "The amulets of the Kerma culture in the national museum of Sudan: From the database to linked open data". In Tipper, Samantha; Shinn, Siobhan (eds.). Current Research in Nubian Archaeology: Oxford Edition (PDF). Piscataway, New Jersey: Gorgias Press. pp. 37–58. doi:10.31826/9781463244552-003.
- Jánosi, Peter (2005). Giza in der 4. Dynastie: Die Baugeschichte und Belegung einer Nekropole des Alten Reiches (PDF) (in German). Vienna: Verlag der Österreichischen Akademie der Wissenschaften.
- Porter, Bertha; Moss, Rosalind L. B. (1974). Málek, Jaromír (ed.). Topographical Bibliography of Ancient Egyptian Hieroglyphic Texts, Reliefs, and Paintings. Volume III. Memphis. Part I. Abû Rawâsh to Abûṣîr (PDF) (2 ed.). Oxford: The Clarendon Press.
- Reisner, George Andrew; Smith, William Stevenson (1955). A History of the Giza Necropolis. Volume II. The Tomb of Hetep-Heres, the Mother of Cheops. Appendix I: The Pottery (PDF). Cambridge, Massachusetts: Harvard University Press.
