= Seshathetep =

Ancient Egyptian official at the royal court

- Vizier of Egypt (possibly)
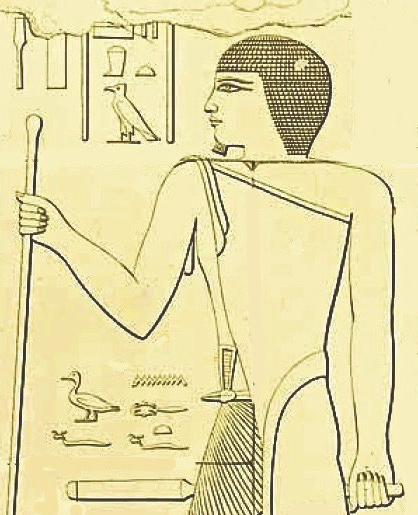
- Relief of Seshathetep Heti (Tomb G 5150)
- Tenure: c. 2500 BC
- Burial: Giza, Giza Governorate, Egypt
- Spouse: Merites
- Children: Seshathetep and Heti

Seshathetep (𓋴𓈙𓏏𓏏𓎛𓏏𓊪, meaning "Seshat is satisfied"; fl. c. 2500 BC), also called Heti, was an ancient Egyptian official at the beginning of the Fifth Dynasty. Seshathetep held many important titles, possibly including that of vizier. With this latter title, he would have been the most important official at the royal court, second only to the king. He also bore the title of king's son of his body, yet it is doubtful that Seshathetep was the real son of a king.

Before he possibly became a vizier, Seshathetep was overseer of all royal works. Seshathetep is mainly known to us from his tomb at Giza. His tomb is a mastaba with a chapel on the south-east side (Mastaba G 5150). The chapel is fully decorated and relatively well preserved. Also depicted in the tomb are his wife Merites, one son who was also called Seshathetep and another son called Heti. The title of vizier is not recorded on the tomb walls but appears on a statue unearthed in the mastaba. This suggests that he was promoted to this high office after the decoration of the tomb was finished. However, the statue in question, which shows a couple, is damaged and the names of the people represented have been lost. Therefore, some scholars argue that the statue belongs to different people and that Seshathetep may not have been a vizier.

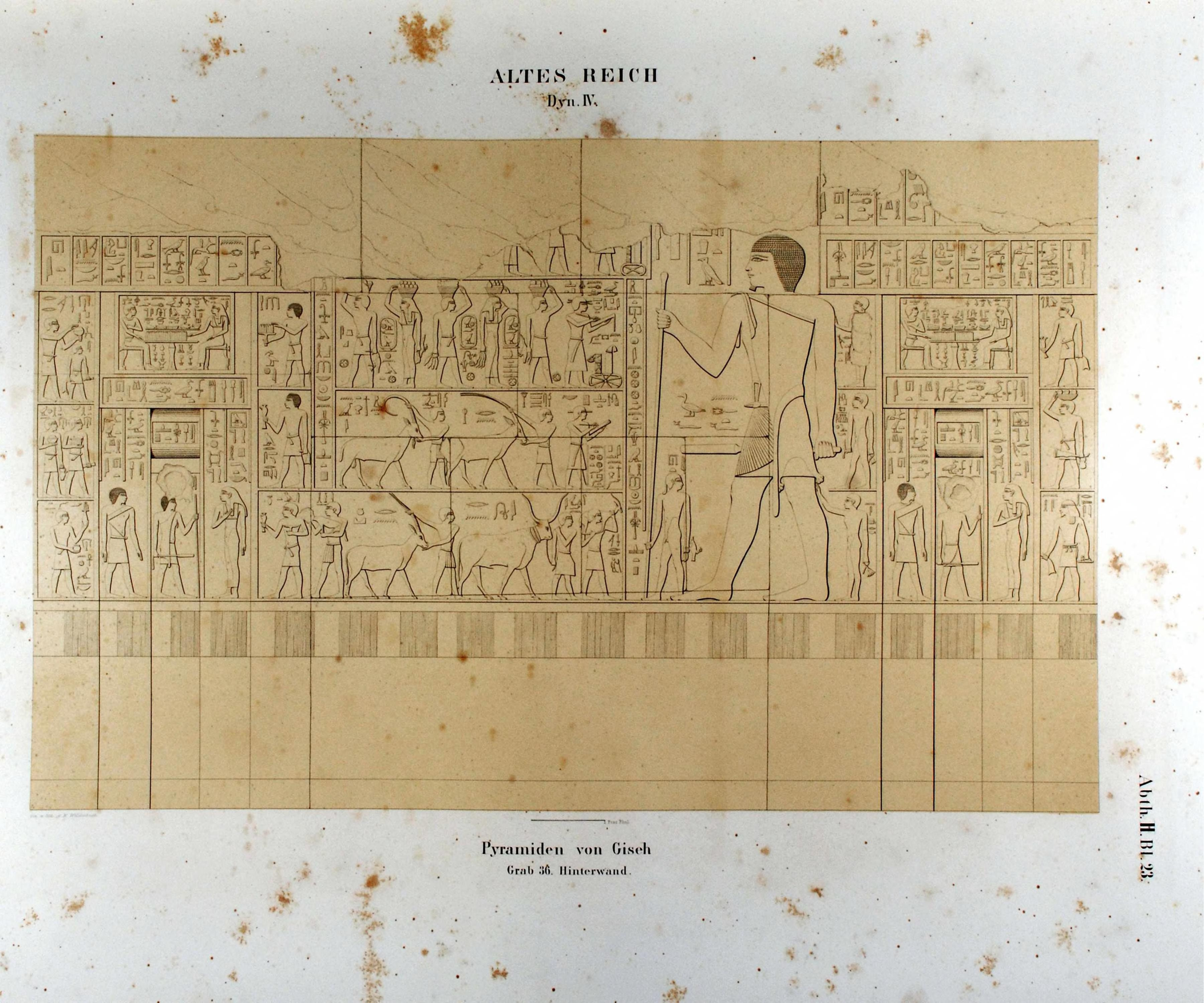
Relief from the tomb of Seshathetep, Giza

== Literature ==
- Altenmüller, Hartwig (2001). "Old Kingdom: Fifth Dynasty". In Redford, Donald B. (ed.). The Oxford Encyclopedia of Ancient Egypt, Volume 2. Oxford: Oxford University Press. pp. 597–601. ISBN 978-0-19-510234-5.
- Baud, Michel (1999). Famille Royale et pouvoir sous l'Ancien Empire égyptien. Tome 2 (PDF). Bibliothèque d'étude 126/2 (in French). Cairo: Institut français d'archéologie orientale. ISBN 978-2-7247-0250-7. Archived from the original (PDF) on 2015-04-02.
- Junker, Herman (1934). Giza II, Die Mastabas der beginnenden V.Dynastie auf dem Westfriedhof. Vienna; Leipzig: Hölder-Pichler-Tempsky A. G.
- Strudwick, Nigel (1985). The Administration of Egypt in the Old Kingdom: The Highest Titles and Their Holders (PDF). Studies in Egyptology. London; Boston: Kegan Paul International. ISBN 978-0-7103-0107-9. Archived from the original (PDF) on 2014-04-03.
