= Mastaba of Kanefer =

Mastaba in Giza belonging to the Fourth Dynasty official Kanefer

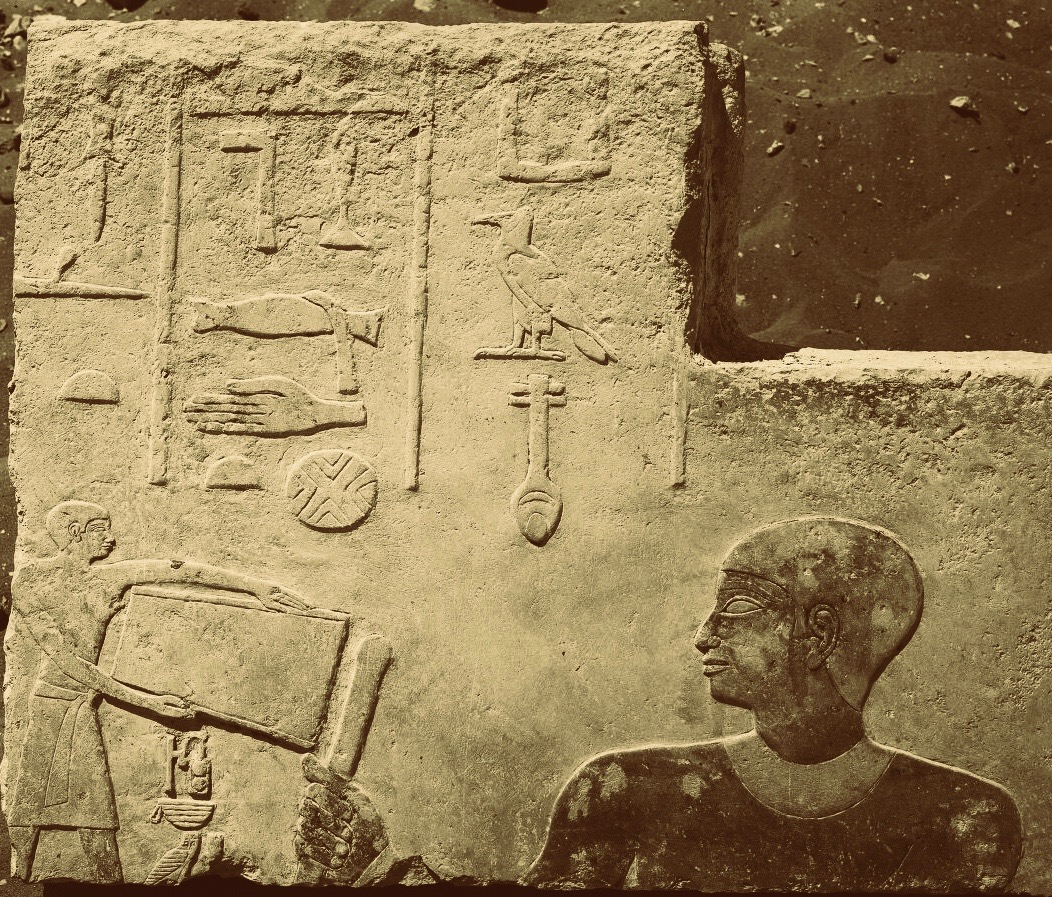
Kanefer on the south wall
Burial site of Kanefer
nfr A kA
- Interactive map of Mastaba of Kanefer
- 29.976111°N 31.132778°E
- Type: Mastaba
- Location: Giza, Egypt

Site notes
- Discovered: 1882
- Core type II a.

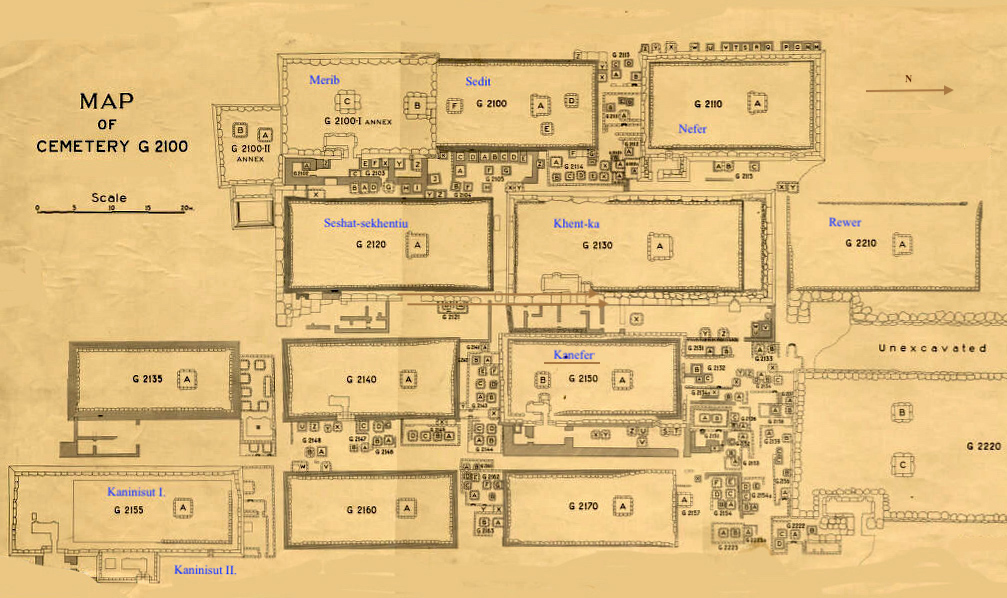
Core mastabas G 2100 map

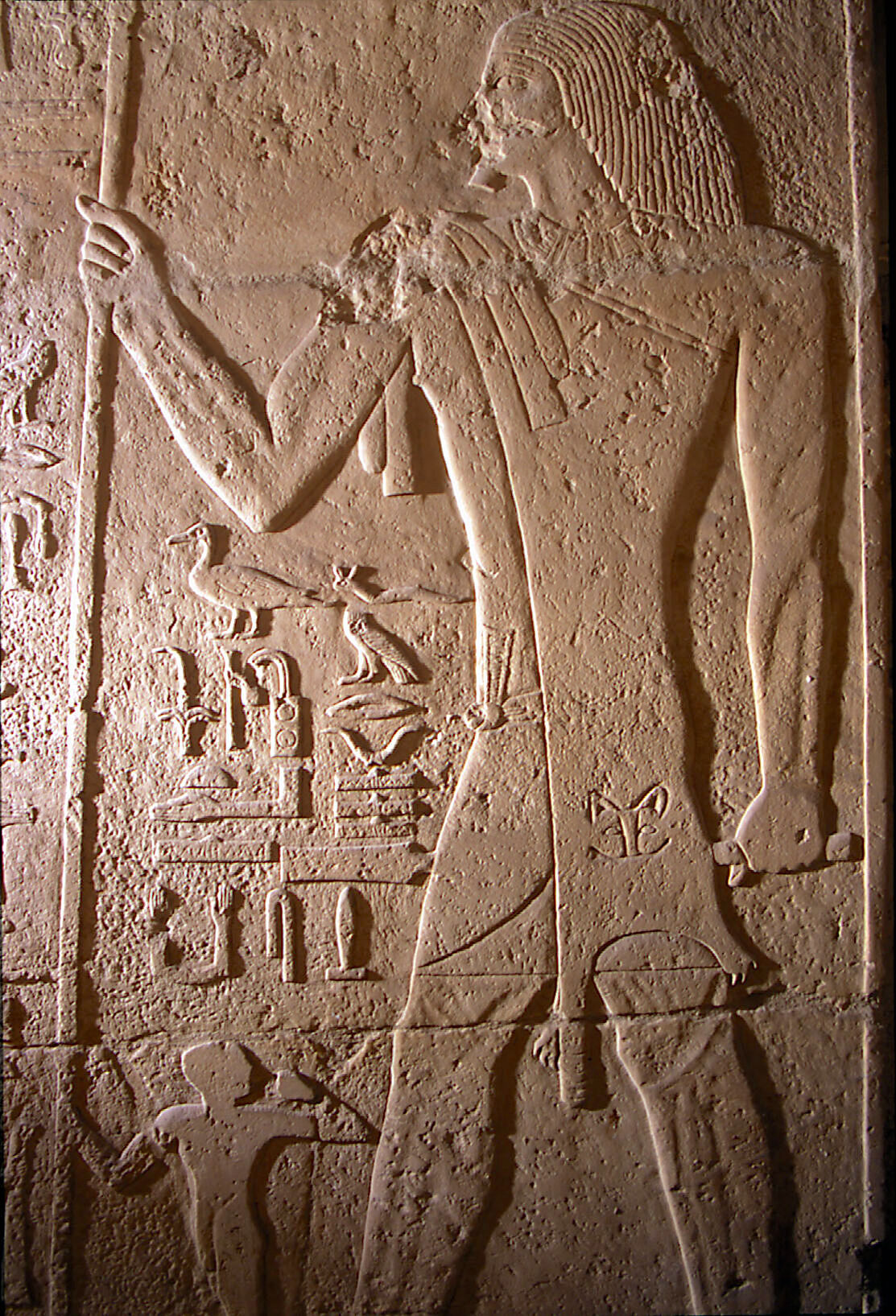
Kanefer relief on west wall, and his son Ka-sewedja on the left

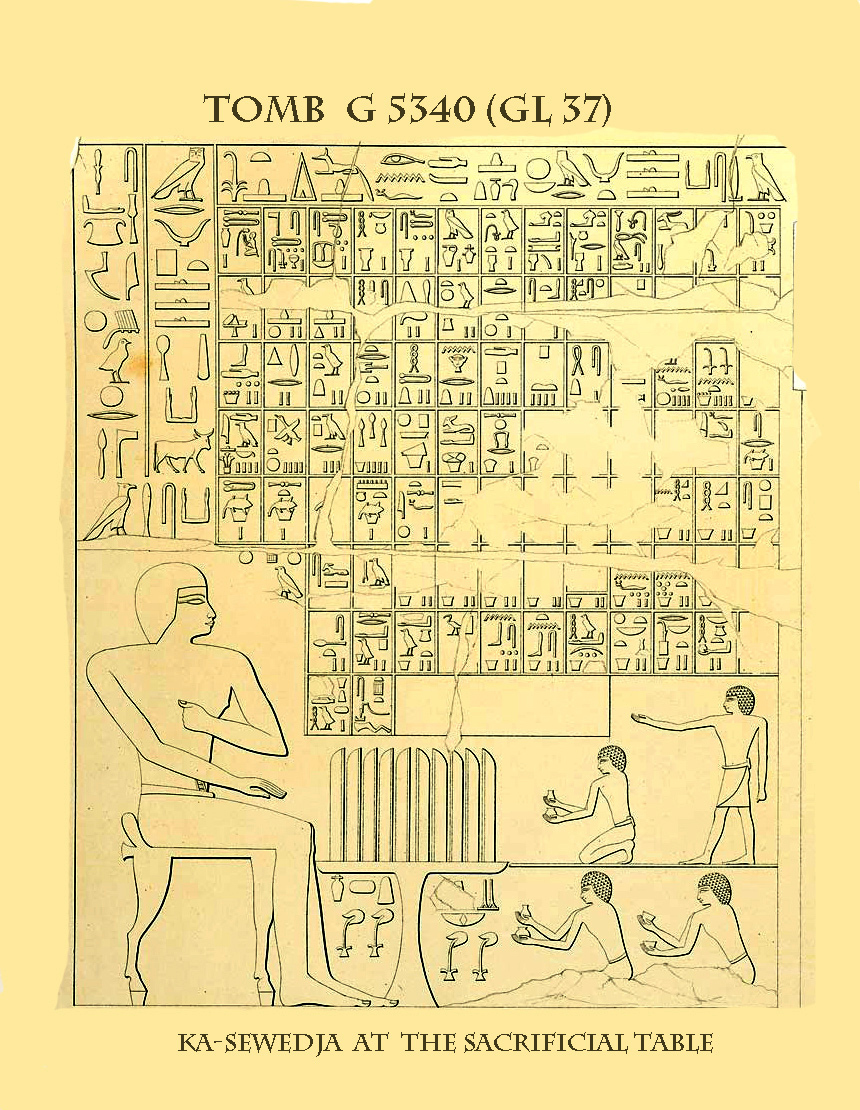
Script at lintel above: May the king be gracious and grant, and Anubis be gracious and grant, that the sacrifices required for him be made every day to the head of the orders, Ka-sewdja

The mastaba of Kanefer (G 2150) is located in Giza western Cemetery at the third row behind the core mastaba G 2100.The owner was identified as Prince Kanefer ["Kꜣ(j)-nfr"] (Note: Alternative translations: Kai-neferu dated to the reign of Menkaure. or Kanufer.)
Part of the project to build the Great Pyramid on the Giza Plateau, in the Fourth dynasty under the reign of Pharaoh Khufu, included also the construction of a group mastabas arranged in rows on the western and eastern slopes of the pyramid. The king’s project idea was the western cemetery reserved for members of the high ranks families and administrators of the court and the eastern cemetery for the king's own family.

== Genesis ==
Cemetery G 2100 at Giza West Field was excavated within the German-Austrian archaeological concession in 1912–1929 and summarised by George Reisner. The cemetery clearly forms a discreet unit, and while Khufu-era mastaba cores may be distinguished from later subsidiary structures added to the area, discernment of the precise evolution of the cemetery awaits further research. In its final form, the cemetery came to consist of thirteen major mastabas cores and a host of later minor subsidiary sepulchres. Reisner divided the major tombs into two sections, an earlier western half, and a later eastern half. Each half contains two north–south rows of mastabas, and the regularity of their layout increases as one moves from west to east. Each tomb owner was an individual of a certain status, who worked in a certain area of administration centrally controlled by the king, and who had a network of family and other social relationships. These and many other aspects of the tomb owner's social situation influenced his decision to create the tomb, its size, specific location in the cemetery, the resources available for its construction and the workshop that was used at the time, and finally the content and execution of the interior decoration while respecting the established canons of religious rituals of belief in an afterlife, indeed. The actual construction of these mastabas, mentioned above, was already carried out as part of the building project of the pyramid during Khufu-era, but their interior decoration was entirely of a later date according to the specifications of their owners, some of whom could be identified by name, many mastabas are anonymous and some of them were unfinished completely. The core cemetery G2100 construction is dated to year 5 of Khufu’s reign for the first and second rows, the third, including mastaba G 2150, later on in reign year 15th are conjectured.

== Mastaba G 2150 ==
The mastaba was investigated several times starting in 1882, and a more detailed study was carried out by Reisner in 1932-1933. The work was resumed again in 1993. The floor of the chapel was re-cleared, revealing a rectangular door socket hole just inside the chapel entrance on the north side. This allowed the door to swing open to the north against the north wall, providing unobstructed access southwards to the rest of the chapel. The mastaba, built of mud bricks measuring 23.3 x 10.4 m, is covered on the outside with grey rubble stones, chapel lined with white limestone has three rooms decorated with reliefs. Northern subsidiary niche a monolithic framed stela was inset in the stepped face. G 2150 was originally a one-shaft mastaba with chief shaft in medial axis north of the mastaba centre. Shaft is sunken in the traditional location north of centre mastaba core. It takes the form of a typical post-Khufu shaft with corridor and burial chamber to the south shaft, but no portcullis grooves or burial chamber lining. Later a secondary shaft was dug south of west of the serdab. The northern shaft (2.1x 2.07 m) with a depth of up to 8.5 m was walled with stones and led into a burial chamber (4.5x3.5 m) covered with plaster. A sarcophagus covered with plaster and with a flat lid was found there. A canopic jar was found near the northern wall. Fragments of vessels, pedestals of statues, fragments of wood, copper dished rectangular razors, chisels, small sheet of leaf gold and other objects were scattered around. All artefacts found were deposited in Museum of Fine Arts.

== Decoration ==
Mastaba G 2150 was classified by Smith as the first of a group of transitional chapels that was lined with fine white limestone and the higher bolder relief style of the offering-room belonged to the old conventional simple type, which extend from the reign of Shepseskaf into the first half of 5th dynasty. (Note: Reisner’s dating later than Menkaure, nevertheless Cherpion proves dating end of the reigns Djedefre)

The chapel of Kanofer (G 2150) was lined with white limestone, but the reliefs are very uneven in quality. The entrance jambs are well carved, bold in style although not very high, and with simple masses little broken by inner detail. The west wall has a large figure in high bold relief, well modelled but the other reliefs are hastily executed. The east wall has figures indicated by little more than incised outlines, roughly drawn and with uneven surfaces. Perhaps the work was unfinished, certainly the evidence points to hasty completion of decoration which had been begun with the carefully executed work of the entrance doorway.

The scenes on the walls of the chapel, that have been preserved, were marked and summarised by Reisner. The figurative scenes are accompanied by numerous, repetitive titles of the mastaba owner Kanefer (Note: Pages 447 - 457 in the right corner of Fig. 262/p.453 there was originally a door drum also marked by Baud p. 594)

- Entrance: On the far right, the married couple standing, in front of him a son, behind him a priest of the dead, on the right three rows of gift-bearers with clothes, etc. On the escape is a dwarf with a monkey. Left: Married couple standing.
- West wall: Between the two false doors the grave lord standing, above him title rows, next to him is his son Ka-sewedja. Before that Priests of the dead and servants with incense and offering. On the left at the southern false door are two sacrificial bearer.
- South wall: Mastaba owner on armchair, in the left hand insect tail, in front of him a table of gifts with bread, cake and goose.
- East wall: Following the illustration the list of victims in the new version. To the left of it and below it is the procession of the representatives of the foundation estates, at the bottom of the slaughter scene.
- North wall: The couple standing, next to it a daughter.

== Kanefer family ==
A part of the figural decorations in the chapel were accompanied by scripts of Kanefer's titles, which show his position in the royal administration and further more symbolic ones emphasising his dignity:

Active competency titles: Overseer of commissions, overseer of the marshlands, staff of the subjects, master of secrets of every foreign land, controller of the two banks of the king, controller of bow-case bearers, elder of the chamber in the double administrations.
Symbolic: King’s son, favourite of his god, staff of the subjects, herdsman of the white bull, priest of Sobek of Crocodilopolis. (Note: Reference to god Sobek and the city of Crocodilopolis point out to relationship near to the oasis Faiyum)

Kanefer in G 2150
Name	Title	hieroglyths
Kanefer mastaba owner	Overseer of commissions, staff of the subjects, elder of the chamber of the double administrations, favourite of his god, Kanefer	m&r F13 t Y2 Y2 Y2 S43 G23 t M40 A19 O1 O1 Z1 Z1 Z11 ib n nTr G7 f D28 G1 F35
Meresankh mother?	Royal acquaintance, sole companion (Note: Possible Meresankh III daughter of Hetepheres II)	mr s anx
Shepsetkau; Kanefer's wife	Priestess of Neith, priestess of Hathor (Note: Possible grand daughter of Khufu and mother Meresankh III)	M23 t r Aa1 N41 t f O10 R8 Hm R24 R12 R8 Hm A50 t D28 D28 D28
Ka-sewedja son	Overseer of commissions	m&r F13 t Y2 Y2 Y2 D28 s U28
Meretites daughter	Royal ornamented	M23 t Aa31 U6 r t t f
