= Seneb =

Ancient Egyptian official, priest

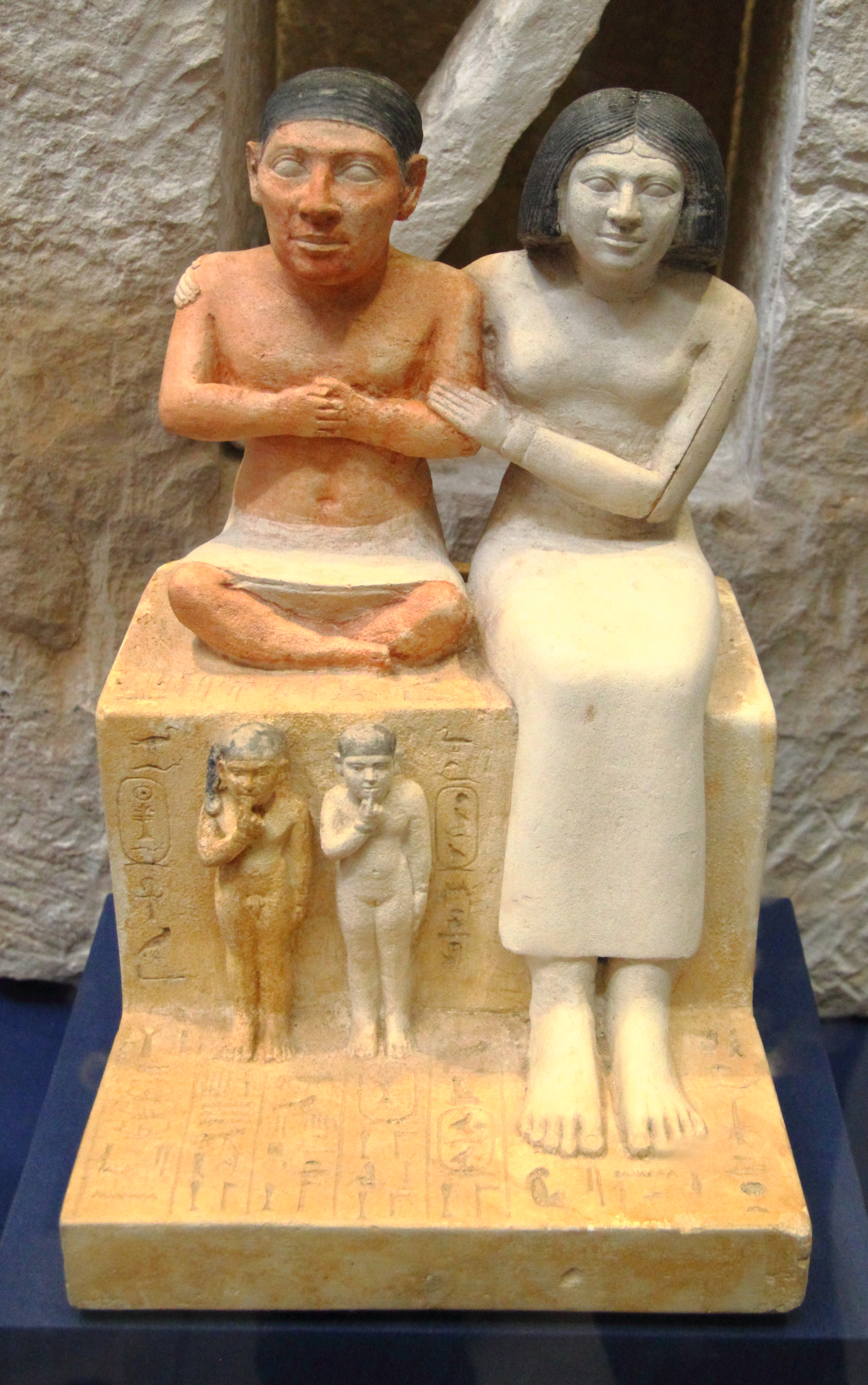
- Seneb (left) with his wife Senetites (right) and their children (below)
- Material: Painted limestone
- Size: H. 22 cm (8.7 in); W. 22.5 cm (8.9 in); L. 25 cm (9.8 in)
- Writing: Egyptian hieroglyphs
- Created: c. 2520 BC
- Discovered: Tomb of Seneb (G 1036), West Field of the Giza Necropolis
- Present location: Egyptian Museum, Cairo
- Identification: JE 51280

S29 n D58
Seneb
in hieroglyphs
Era: Old Kingdom
(2686–2181 BC)

Seneb was a high-ranking court official in the Old Kingdom of Ancient Egypt, circa 2520 BC. A dwarf, Seneb was a person of considerable importance and wealth who owned thousands of cattle, held twenty palaces and religious titles and was married to a high-ranking priestess of average size with whom he had three children. His successful career and the lavishness of his burial arrangements are indicative of the acceptance given to dwarfs in ancient Egyptian society, whose texts advocated the acceptance and integration of those with physical disabilities.

Seneb is depicted with his wife and children in a painted sculpture from his tomb, rediscovered in 1926, that is a famous example of Old Kingdom art. It shows him sitting cross-legged on a block of stone with his wife embracing him and his children standing below him where the legs of a full-size person would ordinarily have been. The composition of the scene thus achieves a harmonious symmetry. It depicts Seneb realistically with the facial features and shortened limbs of an individual with achondroplasia, a common form of dwarfism. Paintings and carvings in the tomb give his titles and depict various scenes from his life, such as carrying out inspections of his estate and holding symbols of his office.

== Discovery and location of Seneb's tomb ==
Map of the Giza Necropolis. Seneb's tomb was found in the western cemetery (the West Field)

Seneb was buried in a mastaba – a flat-roofed brick tomb – located in the West Field of the Giza Necropolis near modern Cairo, where a large complex of ancient Egyptian royal tombs and mortuary structures was built, including the Great Pyramid. It was rediscovered by the German archaeologist Hermann Junker in 1926. The tomb is situated close to that of another dwarf, Perniankhu, a high-ranking royal courtier who may have been Seneb's father. Its date was long uncertain but is now firmly attributed to the reign of Djedefre (2528–2520 BC). His wife's name also appears in the nearby tomb of an official, Ankh-ib, suggesting that the families of Seneb, Perniankhu and Ankh-ib may have been related. Seneb was apparently buried with his wife, but no trace remains of the bodies, and the tomb was looted long ago, like most of the others at Giza. It was one of the first known attempts at building a ceiling dome over a square chamber, with the dome resting on jutting bricks at the corners of the room.

The rectangular interior of Seneb's mastaba contained two cult niches with a false door and cavities containing stone chests. Three statues were found within the chests – the painted limestone sculpture of Seneb and his family and two other statues in wood and granite. The wooden one disintegrated when it was discovered but Junker recorded that it had been about 30 cm (12 in) high and depicted Seneb standing with a walking-staff in one hand and a sceptre in the other. The remnants of the wooden statue are now in the Roemer- und Pelizaeus-Museum Hildesheim in Germany, in a very fragmentary state; the outline of a curled wig can still be made out, as can the pose of the left arm, which was held forward at the elbow. Seneb's 1.5 ton sarcophagus is part of the collection of the Egyptian Museum of the University of Leipzig.

== Sculpture of Seneb and his family ==
The limestone sculpture of Seneb and his family is part of the collection of the Egyptian Museum in Cairo. It depicts Seneb and his wife sitting next to each other with their children in the lower register. Seneb is depicted sitting cross-legged on a block of stone with his arms folded in a position characteristic of a scribe. His wife Senetites sits alongside him, wearing a long robe with long sleeves and a wig covering her natural hair, which can be glimpsed on her forehead. She encircles him with her arms in a gesture of affection and support. She is shown with a slight smile on her face to signify her contentment and happiness.

Two of the couple's children, one boy and one girl, stand below Seneb where the legs of an ordinary person would be. They are depicted nude with their index fingers placed in their mouths and a lock of hair falling on one side of their heads, indicating that they were below the age of puberty, when Egyptian children were given an "adult" haircut. Seneb and his son are shown with darker skin colouring than his wife and daughter. This was a standard artistic convention used to indicate gender and status, reflecting the fact that high-ranking females would remain indoors and retain a light skin colour while males would gain a darker skin from the hot Egyptian sun. The names of three children are recorded, though the third child was not depicted on the sculpture - presumably for reasons of symmetry. They were named after Seneb's royal masters; his son was called Radjedef-Ankh ("May Radjedef live"), his eldest daughter was Awib-Khufu ("Happy is Khufu") and his younger daughter was Smeret-Radjedef ("Companion of Radjedef"). They are depicted with normal proportions, suggesting that they did not inherit their father's condition.

The sculpture's roughly cubical arrangement cleverly ensures that the overall composition retains a harmonious equilibrium. It is lightened by the artist dispensing with a back slab and incorporating negative space into the piece. By putting the children in the place of Seneb's legs, the artist adds to the sense of symmetry. He creates the same impression that would have been made by an ordinary seated figure, preserving an appearance of normality without disguising Seneb's unusual physique. The family's names and titles are given in inscriptions placed on either side of the children and on the horizontal face of the base.

Seneb's dwarfism is depicted realistically in the sculpture. It portrays him with a large head but small arms and legs. This possibly indicates that he had achondroplasia, a common form of dwarfism that most severely affects the fastest-growing parts of the body – particularly the femur and humerus, which become short and squat – and stunts the forearms and lower legs. It also affects the head, producing a relatively large skull with a bulging forehead and often a depressed nasal bridge. An alternative diagnosis is dysmelia – a condition that produces short arms and legs. Seneb's wife Senites is portrayed far less realistically; her depiction is of a piece with other contemporary portraits of high-ranking Egyptian women.

== Role and position ==
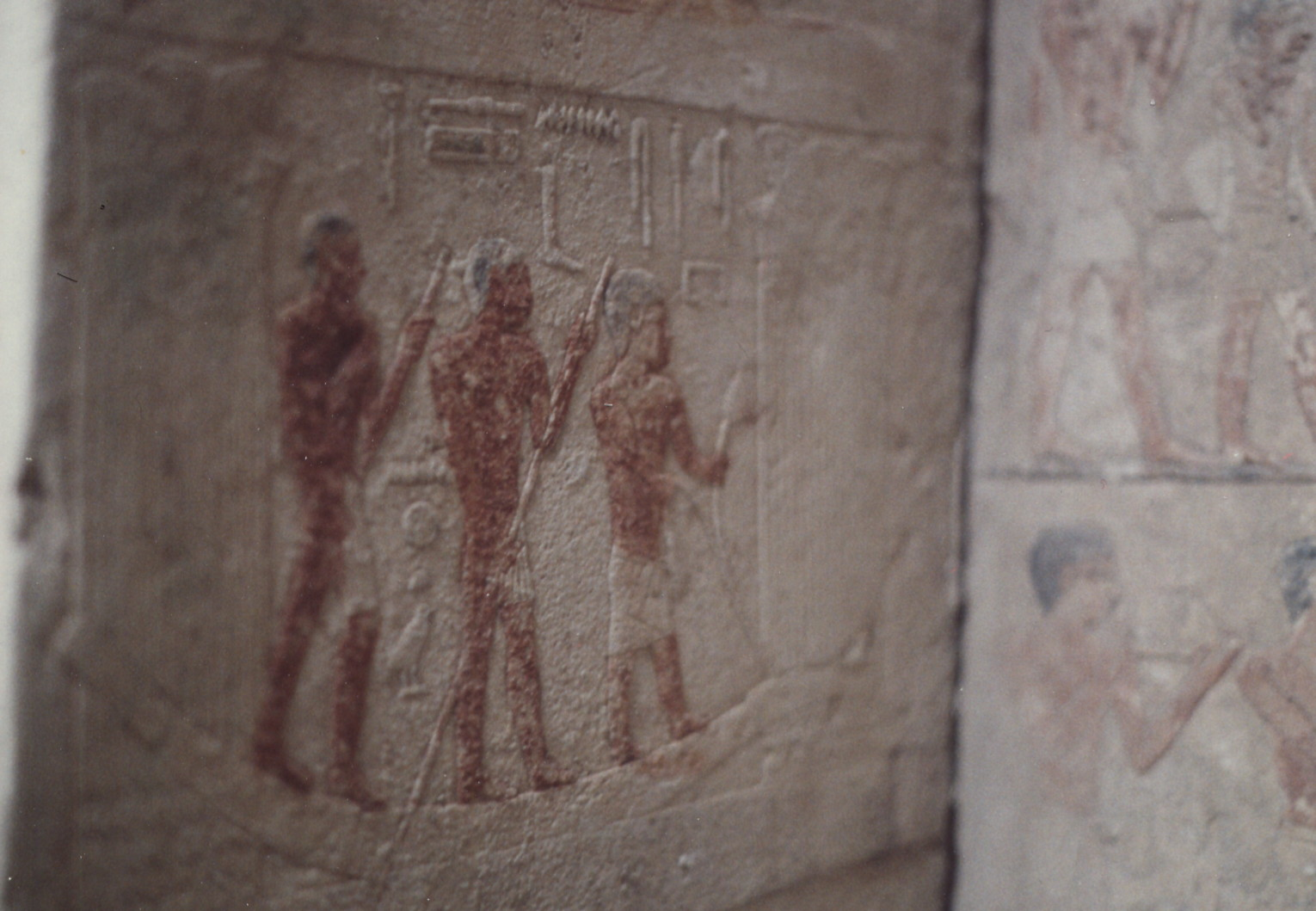
Seneb in a boat; scene from the false door of Seneb.

Seneb's name means "healthy" – perhaps given by his mother as a wish for survival when he was a baby. Many Egyptians possessed similar names, not to denote an absence of disease, but rather to convey a positive message of healthiness and vigour.

Dwarfism was not seen as a defect in ancient Egypt, unlike in many other cultures. Egyptian texts advised the acceptance of those with physical or mental disabilities, and there were even two dwarf gods, Bes and Ptah. A number of dwarfs gained prestigious roles and were given lavish burials in proximity to their royal masters. Seneb's career is documented on his false door and the plinths of his statues, which record twenty titles including "beloved of the lord [king]", "overseer of weaving in the palace", "overseer of dwarfs" (presumably indicating that there were others in the palace), "overseer of the crew of the ks ship" (referring to a ceremonial or cult boat), "overseer of the jwḥw" (possibly referring to animal-tenders), and "keeper of the God's seal of the Wn-ḥr-b3w boat" (referring to a papyrus bark used in certain festivals). His titles suggest that he might have started his career as an official in charge of royal linen and possibly also pets, a role in which other dwarfs are known to have served, and subsequently gained higher-ranking posts in charge of royal or cult boats. Alternatively, he could have been born into a high-ranking family and was given roles appropriate to his birth rank. Seneb also carried out religious rites in his dual role as a priest. He was titled "Priest of Wadjet", priest of "the large bull which is at the head of Sṯpt" and of the bull Mrḥw. He participated in the funeral services for the Pharaohs Khufu, the builder of the Great Pyramid, and his successor Djedefre (Radjedef). His wife Senetites, a woman of normal stature, was likewise a priestess, serving the goddesses Hathor and Neith.

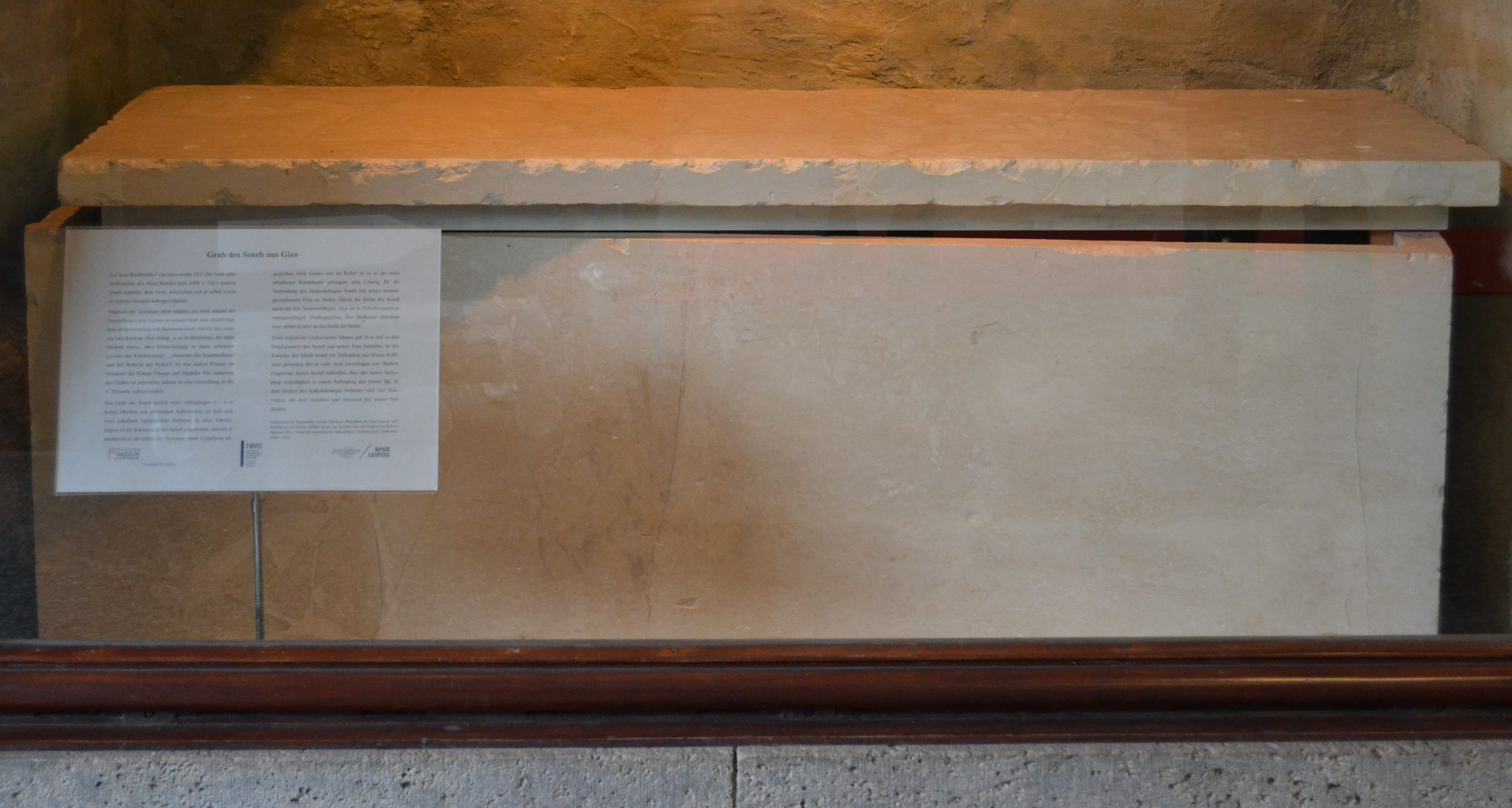
Sarcophagus of Seneb.

Seneb's tomb reliefs and the false door of his tomb indicate his wealth and power. Seneb is described as the owner of several thousand cattle and is shown in various scenes of domestic life – being carried in a litter, sailing in a boat in the Nile Delta, or receiving his children. The false door shows Seneb carrying out the standard activities of a high-ranking courtier such as inspecting his linen and cattle, receiving accounts and overseeing his retainers. He is shown wearing kilts and a priestly robe made of panther skin, and carrying symbols of his office such as a sceptre and staff. One relief shows him accompanied by two pet dogs, each captioned with a name. He is depicted using what were evidently custom-made items of furniture, such as low stools and a specially adapted litter with a low back and large side-panels to conceal his legs.

As with the sculpture, Seneb's size required the creator of the reliefs to make some unusual artistic choices. The standard convention of depicting higher status through physical size was maintained by portraying Seneb as being larger than his retainers, although this was clearly the opposite of the situation that actually existed. On the other hand, he is still shown with the physical characteristics of a dwarf. Unusually for such a relief, his wife is not pictured alongside him but appears separately. This may have been done to avoid the complications that would have arisen from needing to depict the couple's relative sizes realistically while still portraying Seneb as the larger party, as convention would have dictated. Seneb is also not shown carrying out typical male activities such as hunting, which was presumably impractical for someone of his stature, although one relief shows him pulling on papyrus reeds to guide his boat through the marshes of the Nile Delta.
