= Meritites =

mr i t i t f O34
Meritites
in hieroglyphs

Meritites, also spelled Meryetites, Meritates, etc. (mr.t-ỉt=s; “beloved of her father”) was an ancient Egyptian female name. Its notable bearers were:

- Queen Meritites I, wife of Pharaoh Khufu (4th Dynasty)
- Princess Meritites II, a daughter of Khufu and Meritites I; she was buried in the Giza with her husband Akhethotep.
- Meritites III, a daughter of Prince Hornit, eldest son of Pharaoh Djedefre (4th Dynasty)
- Princess Meritites, a daughter of Princess Khamerernebty (daughter of Pharaoh Niuserre) and the Vizier Ptahshepses (5th Dynasty). Was granted the title King's Daughter (the Egyptian equivalent for 'princess') even though she was only the granddaughter of a king.
- Queen Meritites IV, a wife of Pharaoh Pepi II; was buried in a smaller pyramid next to her father, Pepi I's pyramid (6th Dynasty)
- Meritites, a daughter of Ramesses II; 23rd on the Abydos list of princesses (see List of children of Ramesses II) (19th Dynasty)
