= Hermann Junker =

German archaeologist (1877–1962)

Hermann Junker (29 November 1877 in Bendorf – 9 January 1962 in Vienna) was a German archaeologist best known for his discovery of the Merimde-Benisalam site in the West Nile Delta in Lower Egypt in 1928.

== Early life ==
Junker was born in 1877 in Bendorf, the son of an accountant. In 1896 he joined the seminary at Trier, studying theology, where he developed an interest in philosophy and oriental languages. After four years of study Junker entered the priesthood and became a chaplain in Ahrweiler, continuing his language studies with Alfred Wiedemann in Bonn, gradually devoting himself only to Egyptology.

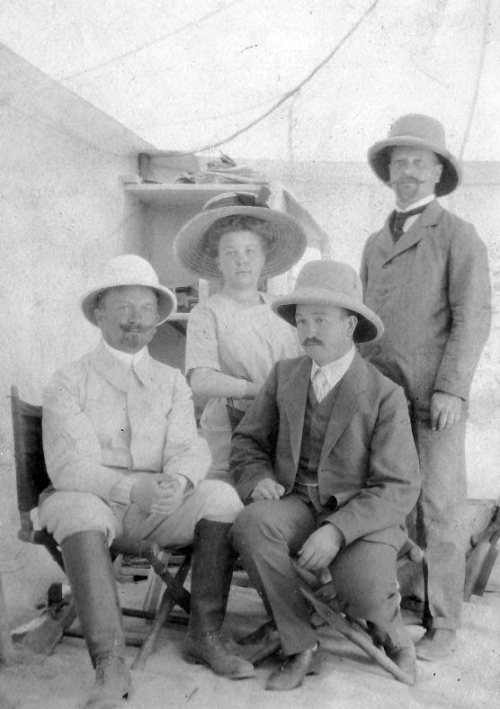
Hermann Junker (sitting on the right) at the cemetery of Arminna (1911/12).

== Professional education ==
In 1901 Junker began studying under Adolf Erman in Berlin, publishing his dissertation in 1903 titled "On the writing system in the Temple of Hathor in Dendera".

In 1906 he published a grammar of the texts at Dendera, which got him an appointment in 1907 as associate professor of Egyptology at the University of Vienna. In 1908 he traveled for the first time to Egypt for the Prussian Academy of Sciences to help document the texts in the Temple of Philae. As a member of the Egyptian Commission of the Austrian Academy of Sciences he was officially proposed as a field director.

== Professional work ==
In winter 1909–1910 Junker began the first official Austrian excavations in the village of Tura near Cairo, where he found rich prehistoric finds that he sent to the Kunsthistorisches Museum in Vienna. The following winter he led excavations at El-Kubanieh north of Aswan, finding prehistoric tombs and cemeteries from the Middle Kingdom and the Nubian C-group. His interest in the ancient Nubian people drew him to the town of Toschke in Middle Nubia, which he excavated in 1911–1912. As a result of his work, in 1912 he was appointed full professor of Egyptology at the University of Vienna.

In January 1912 he began excavating Giza, engaging in three campaigns by 1914 covering an area of 15,000 square meters and more than 600 graves. On 10 January 1913 he discovered Mastaba of Kaninisut. Shortly after the decision was made to purchase the cult chamber of the Kunsthistorisches Museum in Vienna in order explore the typical grave architecture of the Old Kingdom.

The fourth campaign for 1914–1915 was already in the pipeline when World War I prevented further work. Even after the war, the economic situation in Austria and the political situation in Egypt (which remained until 1922 a British protectorate) prevented further work. In January 1926 the fourth campaign began, continuing to the south side of the Great Pyramid in 1928 in the seventh campaign.

After Giza, Junker began excavating the Merimde-Benisalame site in the West Delta. In seven campaigns from 1928 to 1939 he uncovered an extensive Neolithic free settlement that became one of the most important for this epoch.

In 1929 Junker took over the management of the German Institute of Egyptian Archaeology of the Cairo Department of the German Archaeological Institute. In 1934 he became professor of Egyptology at the University of Cairo, where he taught for 10 years.

Caught by surprise on vacation at the outbreak of World War II, excavations in Egypt had to stop. The Cairo Department was moved first to Berlin, then in 1943 to Vienna. During the war Junker continued to work on the publication of materials on Giza, and never returned to Egypt.

== Selected publications ==
- Die Grabung auf dem Mastabafeld von Gizeh. Vienna: Akademie der Wissenschaft, 1912.
- Vorbericht über die zweite Grabung bei den Pyramiden von Gizeh vom 16. Dezember 1912 bis 24. März 1913. Vienna: Akademie der Wissenschaft, 1913.
- Vorläufiger Bericht über die dritte Grabung bei den Pyramiden von Gizeh vom 3. Januar bis 28. April 1914. Vienna: Akademie der Wissenschaft, 1914.
- The Austrian Excavations, 1914. Journal of Egyptian Archaeology 1 (1914), pp. 250–253.
- Bericht über die ägyptische Expedition im Frühjahr 1925. Vienna: Akademie der Wissenschaft, 1925.
- Vorläufiger Bericht über die vierte Grabung bei den Pyramiden von Gizeh. Vienna: Akademie der Wissenschaft, 1927.
- Vorläufiger Bericht über die fünfte Grabung bei den Pyramiden von Gizeh. Vienna: Akademie der Wissenschaft, 1928.
- Vorläufiger Bericht über die sechste Grabung bei den Pyramiden von Gizeh. Vienna: Akademie der Wissenschaft, 1929.
- Vorläufiger Bericht über die siebente Grabung bei den Pyramiden von Giza vom 27. November 1928 bis 25. Februar 1929. Vienna: Akademie der Wissenschaft, 1929.
- Gîza I. Die Mastabas der IV. Dynastie auf dem Westfriedhof. Vienna and Leipzig: Hölder-Pichler-Tempsky, 1929.
- Gîza II. Die Mastabas der beginnenden V. Dynastie auf dem Westfriedhof. Vienna and Leipzig: Hölder-Pichler-Tempsky, 1934.
- Gîza III. Die Mastabas der vorgeschrittenen V. Dynastie auf dem Westfriedhof. Vienna and Leipzig: Hölder-Pichler-Tempsky, 1938.
- Gîza IV. Die Mastaba des K3jm'nh (Kai-em-anch). Vienna and Leipzig: Hölder-Pichler-Tempsky, 1940.
- Gîza V. Die Mastaba des Snb (Seneb) und die umliegenden Gräber. Vienna and Leipzig: Hölder-Pichler-Tempsky, 1941.
- Gîza VI. Die Mastaba des Nfr (Nefer), Kdf.jj (Kedfi), K3hjf (Kahjef) und die westlich anschliessenden Grabanlagen. Vienna and Leipzig: Hölder-Pichler-Tempsky, 1943.
- Gîza VII. Der Ostabschnitt des Westfriedhofs. Erster Teil. Vienna and Leipzig: Hölder-Pichler-Tempsky, 1944.
- Gîza VIII. Der Ostabschnitt des Westfriedhofs. Zweiter Teil. Vienna: Rudolf M. Rohrer, 1947.
- Gîza IX. Das Mittelfeld des Westfriedhofs. Vienna: Rudolf M. Rohrer, 1950.
- Gîza X. Der Friedhof südlich der Cheopspyramide. Westteil. Vienna: Rudolf M. Rohrer, 1951.
- Gîza XI. Der Friedhof südlich der Cheopspyramide. Ostteil. Vienna: Rudolf M. Rohrer, 1953.
- Gîza XII. Schlußband mit Zusammenfassungen und Gesamt-Verzeichnissen von Band I–XII. Vienna: Rudolf M. Rohrer, 1955.
- "Mutter und Sohn auf einem Relief des frühen Alten Reiches." Anzeiger der phil.-hist. Klasse der Österreichischen Akademie der Wissenschaften, Jahrgang 1953, Nr. 14, pp. 171–175.
- The Offering Room of Prince Kaninisut. Vienna: Kunsthistorisches Museum, 1931.
- Zu einigen Reden und Rufen auf Grabbildern des Alten Reiches. Akademie der Wissenschaften in Wien, Philosophisch-historische Klasse, Sitzungsberichte, 221. Band, 5. Abhandlung. Vienna and Leipzig: Hölder-Pichler-Tempsky, 1943.

== References and notes ==
Clemens Gütl (Hrsg.): Hermann Junker. Eine Spurensuche im Schatten der österreichischen Ägyptologie und Afrikanistik. Cuvillier, Göttingen 2017, ISBN 978-3-7369-9549-9.
