= Hetepheres =

Hetepheres is the name of several queens, princesses and noble women from the Fourth dynasty of Egypt.

- Hetepheres I, wife of Pharaoh Sneferu and mother of Khufu
- Hetepheres A, daughter of Sneferu, wife of Ankhhaf
- Hetepheres II, daughter of Khufu, wife of Prince Kawab and pharaoh Djedefre
- Hetepheres B, daughter of Djedefre
- Hetepheres C, wife of Baka (son of Djedefre)

== Literature ==
- Dodson and Hilton: The Complete Royal Families of Ancient Egypt, London, 2004
- Wolfram Grajetzki: Ancient Egyptian Queens – a hieroglyphic dictionary, London, 2005

== See also ==
- Egyptian Fourth Dynasty Family Tree
