= Giza East Field =

Ancient cemetery in Egypt

Coordinates: 29.9782°N 31.1374°E

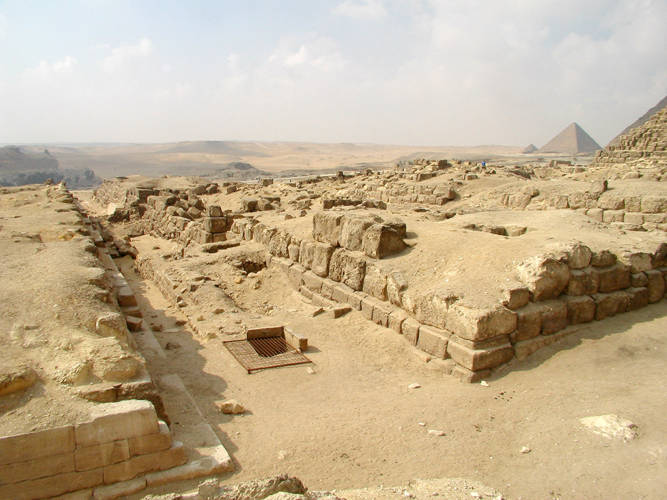
Mastabas to the east of the pyramid of Khufu.

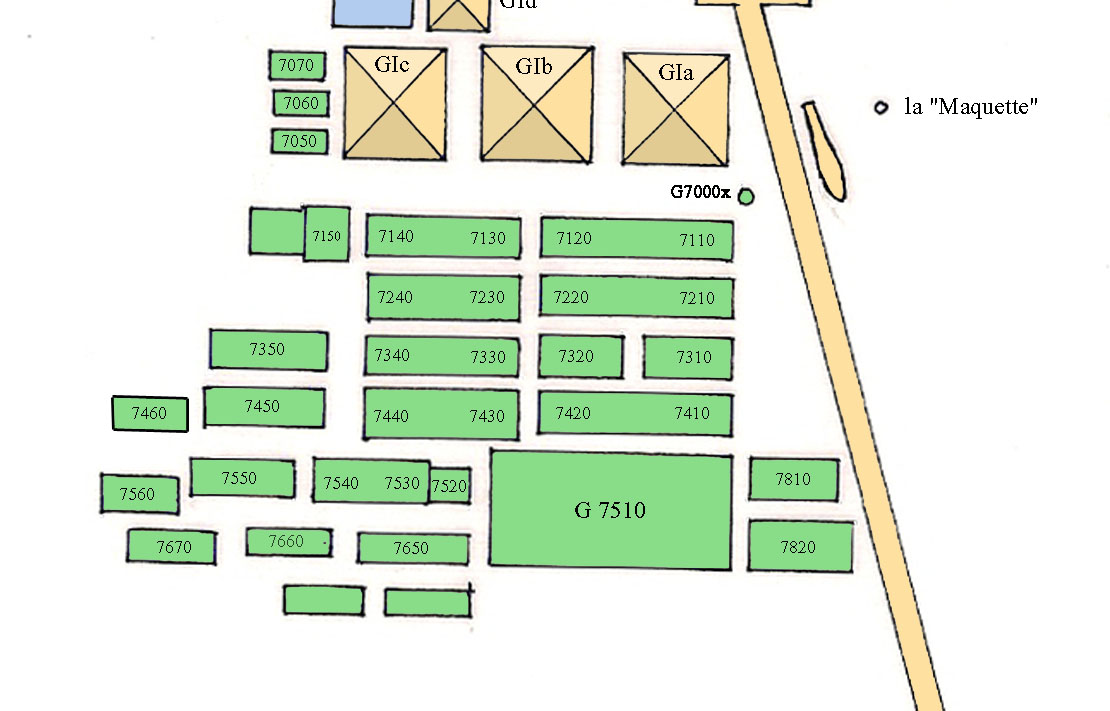
Map of the East Field in Giza

The East Field is located to the east of the Great Pyramid of Giza and contains cemetery G 7000. This cemetery was a burial place for some of the family members of Khufu. The cemetery also includes mastabas from tenants and priests of the pyramids dated to the 5th and 6th Dynasty.

The East Field consists of the three Queen's pyramids and a number of mastabas labeled Cemetery G 7000. George Andrew Reisner constructed a timeline for the construction of the East Field. The first two Queen's Pyramids, G 1a and G 1b, were likely started in years 15–17 of Khufu's reign. Queen's pyramids were usually constructed to the south of the king's pyramid, but in this instance a quarry was located to the south and the construction of the smaller pyramids was relocated to the east of the main pyramid complex. The earliest part of the cemetery consisted of 12 mastabas which were built as double mastabas. They were laid out in three rows of four tombs:

- G 7110–7120 Kawab and Hetepheres II and G 7130–7140 Khufukhaf I and his wife Nefertkau II
- G 7210–7220 Hordjedef and his wife and G 7230–7240
- G 7310–7320 Baufra and G 7330–7340

The construction of these tombs has been dated to approximately years 17–24 of the reign of Khufu. This core was then completed to create a nucleus of eight twin-mastabas by the construction of:

- G 7410–7420 Meresankh II and Horbaef and G 7430–7440 Minkhaf I

The rest of the eastern field was built around this group of eight twin mastabas. Of these, the great mastaba G 7510 of the prince and vizier Ankhhaf stands out due to its size. The construction of several other mastabas can be dated to the time of Khafre. G 7530–7540, the tomb of Meresankh III, contains quarry inscriptions dating to year 13 of that king. Mastaba G 7050, belonging to Nefertkau I, was built during the reign of Khafre as well. Further additions date to the end of the 4th, 5th and 6th dynasty and even later.

== Queen's pyramids ==
Pyramid G 1a was at first thought to belong to Queen Meritites I but Lehner has shown that the pyramid belonged to Hetepheres I instead. All three pyramids have a square base measuring about 45–49 m on a side. The angle of inclination is about 51° 50‘ for all three.

Pyramid number	Pyramid	Name of owner	Title owner	Time Period	Comments
G 1a		Hetepheres I Htp t p Hr r s	King's wife, king's daughter	Dynasty IV	Wife of Sneferu and mother of Khufu.
G 1b		Meritites I mr r t t f s	King's wife	Dynasty IV	Wife of Khufu
G 1c		Henutsen; H nw t s n	King's daughter	Dynasty IV	Said to be a daughter of Khufu on a stela placed in the temple during the 26th dynasty, but more likely to be a wife.

Shaft tomb:

Pyramid number	Type	Name of owner	Title owner	Time Period	Comments
G 7000X	Burial Shaft	Hetepheres I Htp t p Hr r s	King's Wife and King's Mother	Dynasty IV (time of Sneferu to Khufu)	Her sarcophagus (empty) and funerary equipment were found in this shaft which is located to the north-east of the Queen's pyramids.

== Cemetery G 7000 ==
Nucleus of Cemetery G 7000

Tomb number	Type	Name of owner	Title owner	Time Period	Comments
G 7110 +7120	Double-Mastaba	Kawab and Hetepheres II	Eldest king's son	Dynasty IV(Khufu)	Son and daughter of Khufu.
G 7130 +7140	Double-Mastaba	Khufukhaf I and his wife Nefertkau II	Partial title list: Vizier, hereditary prince, administrator of Buto, priest of Khufu, King's son, King's son of his body, Sole companion.	Dynasty IV (Khufu)	Son of Khufu. Was elevated to vizierate after the completion of his tomb. A statue was set up in his chapel to record that.
G 7210 +7220	Double-Mastaba	Hordjedef and his wife	King's son of his body, Count, Keeper of Nekhen, etc.	Dynasty IV (time of Khufu)	Son of Khufu.
G 7230 +7240	Double-Mastaba			Dynasty IV (time of Khufu)	
G 7310 +7320	Double Mastaba	Bauefre/Babaef	King's son	Dynasty IV	Bȝw.f-Rˁ(other reading Rˁ-bȝw.f) is listed as a Khufu son in Papyrus Westcar, because of this Reisner assigned to him the anonymous G7310+20. Attribution is uncertain.
G 7330 +7340	Double-Mastaba			Middle or late Dynasty IV	
G 7410 +7420	Double-Mastaba	Meresankh II and Horbaef	Meresankh: King's daughter, King's wife; Horbaef: King's Son	End of Dynasty IV	A daughter Nebtitepites is mentioned in the chapel.
G 7430 +7440 (LG 61)	Double-Mastaba	Minkhaf I	King's son and Vizier	Dynasty IV	Minkhaf was a son of Khufu.

The later additions to the cemetery:

Tomb number	Type	Name of owner	Title owner	Time Period	Comments
G 7011	Stone-Mastaba	Khnumwer			
G 7050	Stone-Mastaba	Nefertkau I	King's daughter	Dynasty IV	Daughter of Sneferu. Mother of Nefermaat II and grandmother of Sneferukhaf.
G 7060 (LG 57)	Stone-Mastaba	Nefermaat II	King's Son and Vizier	Dynasty IV (Khafre)	Son of Nefertkau I.
G 7070 (LG 56)	Stone-Mastaba	Sneferukhaf	Treasurer of the King of Lower Egypt, Herdsman of Apis, etc.	Mid IV to Dynasty V	Son of Nefermaat II.
G 7101	Stone-Mastaba	Merirenefer called Qar	Overseer of all works, he who is at the head of the king, true royal document scribe in the presence, etc.	Dynasty VI (Pepi I or later)	Son of Idu (G 7102)
G 7102	Stone-Mastaba	Idu	Overseer of the great chapel, overseer of scribes of the meret-serfs, etc.	Dynasty VI (Pepi I or later)	Father of Qar ( G 7101)
G 7111	Stone-Mastaba			Late IV to early Dynasty V	
G 7112	Mud-brick mastaba			Dynasty V (reign of Nyuserre Ini)	
G 7121	Stone-Mastaba			Dynasty IV?	Ushabti fragments inscribed for the High Priest of Ptah in Memphis, named Pahemnetjer, were found.
G 7133	Stone-Mastaba	Minankh	Royal acquaintance	Late Dynasty IV	Khufukhaf I is mentioned in the tomb.
G 7142	Mud-brick mastaba			V to Dynasty VI (?)	Names of Nabeni and Nebuka appear on lintel.
G 7145 +7147	Double-Mastaba				The mastaba had 7 burial shafts.
G 7148 +7149	Double-Mastaba				The mastaba had 5 burial shafts.
G 7150	Stone-Mastaba	Khufukhaf II and his wife Khentkaues	Khentkaues is a King's daughter of his body	Dynasty V (time of Nyuserre Ini)	Possibly a son of Khufukhaf I.
G 7152	Stone-Mastaba	Sekhem-ankh-Ptah		Late V or Dynasty VI	
G 7211	Stone-Mastaba				There are 16 burial shafts. Attested are Mereru and Ipty (on a lintel reused in roofing of shaft G 7214 B) and Inkaf (judge, inspector of scribes shaft G 7214 A).
G 7214	Stone and brick Mastaba	Kaemankh		Late Dynasty V or Dynasty VI	
G 7215	Rock-cut tomb	Bendjet?		Dynasty VI?	Bendjet is the daughter of Idu (G 7102) and likely the sister of Qar (G 7101). Nebit, wife of Qar is attested on a doorjamb. The names of Nebenheb, Nedjfu are inscribed on a headrests. Mentioned in inscriptions are Nefrethakhufu (named Sherit?) and Wabha.
G 7244 +7246	Double-Mastaba	Khuenptah		Dynasty V	Khuenptah's mother Intkaes and wife Khenut are mentioned.
G 7248	Stone and rubble mastaba	Mestju ?	ka-priest	Dynasty V or Dynasty VI	Mestju may not be the actual owner. He is the owner of a false door which depicts him with his wife Nebuhetep and a daughter Khenut.
G 7249	Stone and brick Mastaba	Menib		IV or Dynasty V	
G 7331 +7332	Double-Mastaba				
G 7350	Stone-Mastaba	Hetepheres II(?)		End of Dynasty IV	Kawab, Djedefre and Hetepheres II are mentioned in inscriptions.
G 7391	Stone-Mastaba	Iteti and his wife Senetankh		Dynasty V	Mentioned in the tomb are Iteti's sons Washkakhafre, Iteti, and Werkaukhafre, and a daughter named Autib. Also shown are his brother Khafreankh and sister Rudj.
G 7411	Stone-Mastaba	Kaemtjenent and his wife Hathornefer		Dynasty V	
G 7413	Rock-cut tomb, stone casing	Niankh-Khufu			
G 7432	Stone-Mastaba	Qar		Late Dynasty V	
G 7509	Shafts only	Meresankh Isi			
G 7510	Stone-Mastaba	Ankhhaf and wife Hetepheres	Ankhaf: King's Son and Vizier	Dynasty IV	Hetepheres was a daughter of Sneferu and Hetepheres I.
G 7511	Stone-Mastaba			Ptolemaic Period	Shabtis inscribed for Djedhor and Isetreshet.
G 7512	Mud-brick mastaba	Maakheru		V – Dynasty VI	
G 7521	Mud-brick mastaba	Nihetep-ptah Hepi	Inspector of palace attendants of the Great House		Wife: Imty, sisters: Inty, Teti and Meresankh. Sons: Sesiheryib, Sesikhemetnu, Sesiwer. Daughters: Wehemre, Shefetnet, Henenti and Nebet.
G 7523	Stone-Mastaba	Sedaf Iby	Overseer of the Two Houses, director of the broad hall	V – Dynasty VI	
G 7524	Stone-Mastaba	Kay	Judge and administrator, preeminent of place, overseer of commissions	XXVI dynasty	
G 7530 +7540	Stone-Mastaba	Meresankh III	King's daughter	Late Dynasty IV	Meresanch was a daughter of Kawab and wife of king Khafre. Graffiti with mention of years were found in the tomb.
G 7550 (LG 58)	Stone-Mastaba	Duaenhor	King's son	Dynasty IV	
G 7560	Stone-Mastaba			Middle or late Dynasty IV	
G 7631	Stone Mastaba	Ninefer		V – Dynasty VI	
G 7632	Stone-Mastaba			Late Period	People attested in the tomb are: Nesiptah, Tashamsha, Wahibre, Ahmose, Ankhenes-(?), Hetepef-hesu-(?), Psamtik-seneb, Wadjetirdis, Ankhtef, and Isiskhebit.
G 7650	Stone-Mastaba	Akhethotep and his wife Meritites II	Akhethotep: director of the palace Meritites: King's daughter of his body	Dynasty IV	Meritites was a daughter of Khufu.
G 7660 (LG 59)	Stone-Mastaba	Kaemsekhem	King's Son	Late Dynasty IV	Son of Kawab.
G 7690	Stone-Mastaba	Iui	Inspector of ka-priests	Old Kingdom	
G 7710	Rock-cut tomb, Stone casing	Iby	Royal acquaintance, juridical scribe, secretary, etc.	V – Dynasty VI	
G 7711	Rock-cut tomb	Khnumdjedef	King's son	V – Dynasty VI	
G 7721	Rock-cut tomb	Kakherptah		Dynasty V	
G 7750	Stone-Mastaba			Mid to late Dynasty IV	Sons of the owner named Khenuka and Kamenekh are mentioned.
G 7757	Stone-Mastaba	Kheperre	General (Overseer of the army)	Ptolemaic Period	His mother Tashereteniset was buried here as well. The sarcophagus is now in the Museum of Fine Arts in Boston.
G 7760 (LG 60)	Stone-Mastaba	Mindjedef	King's Son	Dynasty IV	Mindjedef is a son of Kawab.
G 7772	Stone-Mastaba			Dynasty V	
G 7788	Stone-Mastaba			XVIII dynasty	
G 7792	Stone-Mastaba			XXVI dynasty	Ushabtis were found with names: Wahibre, Denitptah, Denitenkhonsu, Tasheri-ihet, and Patjenef. A statue of Osiris is now in the Museum of Fine Arts in Boston.
G 7803	Rock-cut tomb			V – Dynasty VI	Graffiti mentioning dates were found in the tomb.
G 7809	Mud-brick, rubble mastaba	Reti	royal acquaintance, overseer of ka-priests	Dynasty V	
G 7810	Stone-Mastaba	Djati	King's son	Late IV or early Dynasty V	
G 7814	Rock-cut tomb	Kaaper		V – Dynasty VI	
G 7815	Rock-cut tomb	Hapennebti		V – Dynasty VI	
G 7820	Stone-Mastaba	Nefertkau III and her husband Iynefer		Late IV or early Dynasty V	Nefertkau may be a daughter of Meresankh II.
G 7821	Rock-cut tomb	Neferseshemptah Sheshi and his wife Meresankh	royal acquaintance, steward of the Great Estate	V – Dynasty VI	
G 7822	Rock-cut tomb	Mesu and his wife Neferdjes		V – Dynasty VI	
G 7836	Rock-cut tomb	Nebtyherkaus		Dynasty V	
G 7837 +7843	Rock-cut tomb	Ankhmare		First half of Dynasty V	Two separate mastabas were combined into one.
G 7851	Rock-cut tomb	Wermeru and his wife Isutkau	Royal wab-priest, priest of Heka, priest of Snefru, priest of Khafre	Late V – Dynasty VI	
G 7911	Mud-brick mastaba	Nikhasutnisut	Scribe, ka-priest	V – Dynasty VI	
G 7946	Mud-brick mastaba	Nefu and his wife Khenmetsetju		V – Dynasty VI	
G 7948 (LG 75)	Rock-cut tomb	Khafraankh and his wife Herenka		Dynasty V or later	

== See also ==
- Giza West Field
