= Tomb of Hetepheres I =

Ancient Egyptian shaft tomb at Giza

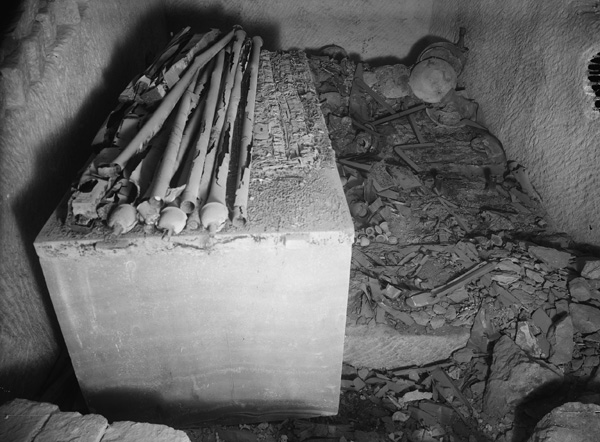
- The tomb in 1926; Original burial site of Hetepheres I
- Interactive map of Tomb of Hetepheres I
- Type: Tomb
- Location: Giza, Egypt

Site notes
- Discovered: 8 March 1925 by Alan Rowe

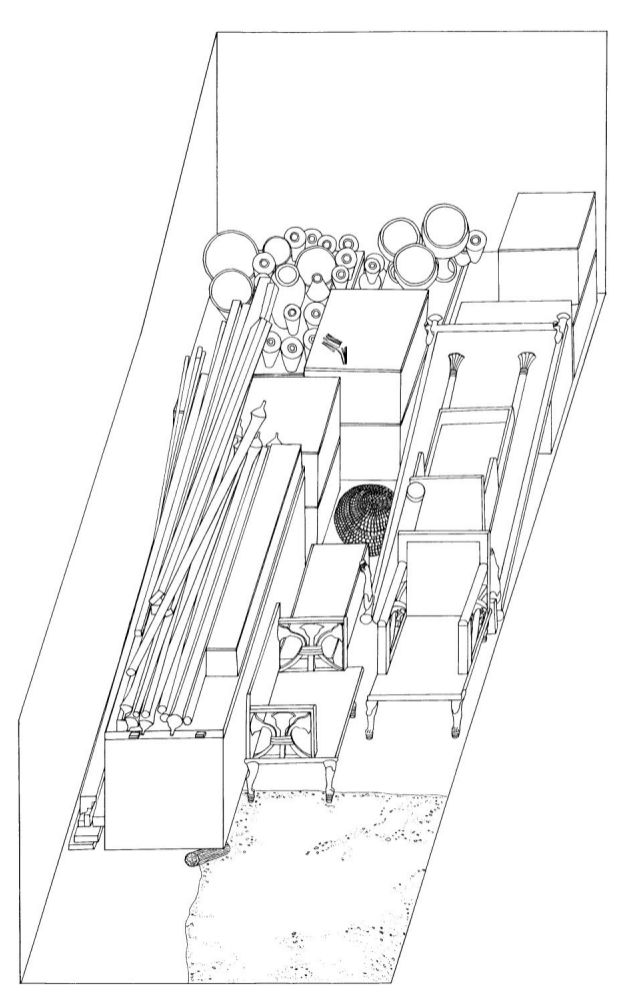
Reconstruction of the original grave furnishings by George Reisner

The Tomb of Hetepheres I (also G 7000x) is an Ancient Egyptian shaft tomb at Giza. It is part of the Eastern Cemetery of the Great Pyramid of Giza (Necropolis G 7000) and is located near the northeast corner of the northern queenly pyramid G1-a. The Egyptian queen Hetepheres I was the mother of Khufu and probably the wife of Sneferu.

The tomb was discovered in 1925 by the staff of Egyptologist George Andrew Reisner. A shaft, more than 27 meters deep, leads to a chamber that still contains large parts of the queen's burial objects. The organic material of the finds had already decomposed, leaving only dust and tiny fragments. Through painstaking work, many of the objects could be reconstructed. The tomb became famous for the style and richness of the royal grave furnishings. It is the best-preserved tomb of a queen of the Old Kingdom.

However, the tomb was not dug up. The alabaster sarcophagus was found empty, but the sealed canopic jar containing the entrails was still intact. No satisfactory explanation has yet been found for these findings. It was certainly not the Queen Mother's regular tomb. It may have been a hidden grave (cachette) to protect her from grave robbers, or an emergency grave.

== Discovery and research ==
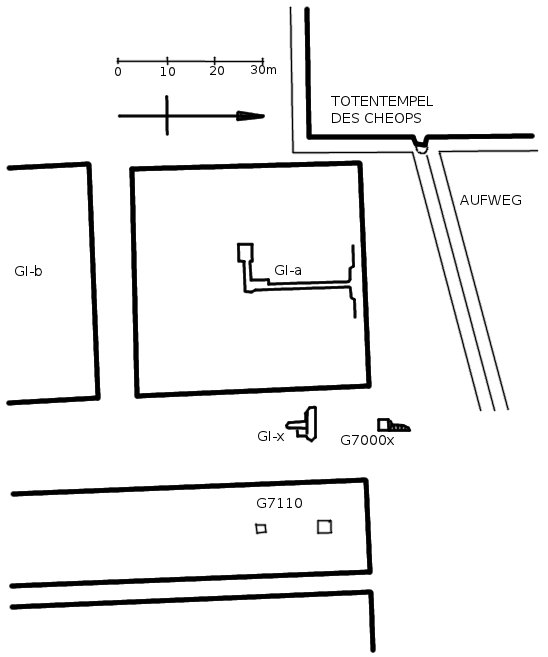
Location of tomb G7000x of Hetepheres in the eastern cemetery of the Pyramid of Khufu

George Reisner had been leading excavations around the Pyramids of Giza since 1905. On February 2, 1925, while the photographer of the American team was looking for a suitable place to take good pictures on the east side of Khufu's Pyramid, a leg of the camera tripod slipped into an unusual crevice in the rock, which turned out to be the hidden mouth of a shaft and a staircase. Reisner was in the United States at the time. After two weeks of removing debris from the shaft and stairs, the archaeologists discovered the entrance to the burial chamber, which had been closed since ancient times. On March 8, 1925, Alan Rowe, the deputy director of the archaeological excavation, opened the chamber for the first time. It was full of piled things. The organic materials had already decayed, leaving only dust and tiny fragments. The entire floor of the room was filled with gold plates from the gilded furniture that had once been placed there. It was clear from the discovery that this was not an undisturbed burial, as ceramics were smashed and linen was scattered about.

On March 12, Reisner ordered the chamber closed again until he returned to Egypt. It was not reopened until January 21, 1926, under his direction. Over 321 working days, the young Dows Dunham, in particular, meticulously recorded every object. The work was dangerous: a stone fell from the ceiling of the chamber and Dunham escaped unharmed only because he was wearing a helmet. In addition to Reisner and Dunham, Noel Wheeler was also involved in emptying the chamber. This work resulted in a total of 1,701 manuscript pages of plans and notes and 1,057 photographs. This made it possible to determine the original position of the disintegrated objects and also to reconstruct the arrangement of all the tomb furnishings. Although reconstructions of fragments are part of the daily work of archaeologists and many Egyptologists, this reconstruction is a particularly outstanding achievement.

On March 3, 1927, after the entire chamber had been cleared, the eagerly awaited opening of the sarcophagus took place in the presence of a prestigious society. But the excavators were disappointed: it was empty. Lindon Smith, who participated in the opening, reported:

"When [the lid] was lifted high enough for me to look inside, I saw to my great dismay that the Queen was not inside - the sarcophagus was empty! I turned to Reisner and said in a louder voice than I intended, 'George, it's a dud! Then the Minister of Public Works asked, 'What is a dud? Reisner rose from his box and said, 'Gentlemen, I'm afraid Queen Hetepheres will not grant an audience. Then he added: 'Mrs. Reisner will serve refreshments in the camp [...]'."

— Lindon Smith

On April 18, 1927, the 2.2-ton sarcophagus was recovered, and on May 21, the walled niche containing the intact canopic chest was opened. It was only after 25 years of painstaking reconstruction work that the entire tomb was published.

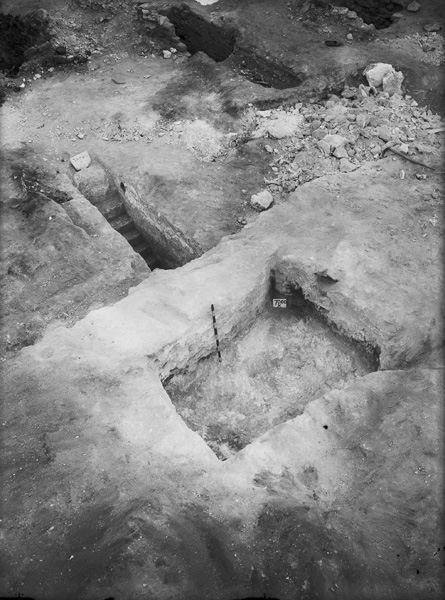
Shaft and stairs after first stone removal, 1925

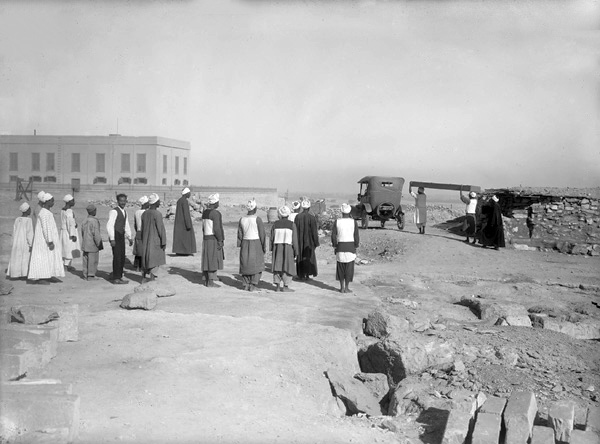
Removal of a box of finds, 1926

== Architecture ==
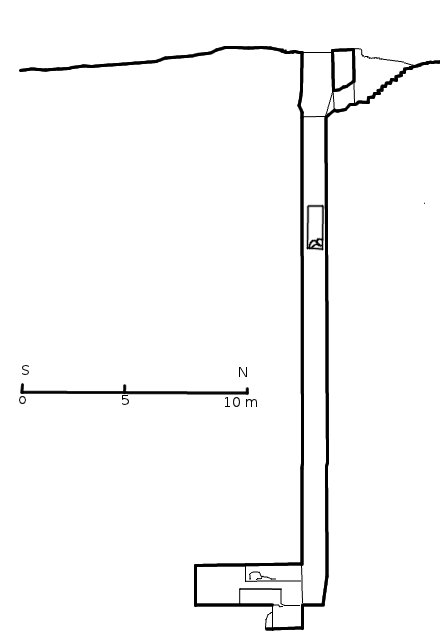
Section through the Hetepheres shaft tomb

The grave has no superstructure. A twelve-step staircase 55 cm wide leads up to the shaft, first open over a length of 3.4 m, then a further 95 cm into the rock. It meets the shaft at a depth of 3 m. The mouth of the shaft measures 1.75 m (north-south) × 2.37 m (east-west). The width soon narrows to between 1.35 m and 1.55 m. At the upper edge of the shaft, incisions were found for beams, which were probably used to lower the sarcophagus. Recesses were made in the walls of the shaft to allow the workers to climb up and down.

At a depth of 7.47 m, a 2.10 m high and 1.67 m deep niche was reached in the west wall. This closed off a 92 cm × 67 cm area containing a horned skull and three bull leg bones wrapped in a decaying reed mat. In addition, there were two wine jars and a limestone, which Rowe believes was used for the ritual breaking of the bull's skull, a piece of silver, and some fragments of basalt and charcoal. These form an offering associated with the introduction of the grave goods.

At a depth of 27.42 m, the shaft leads to the 1.92 m high entrance to the burial chamber. This leads 5.22 m to the south, with a varying width of 2.67 to 2.77 m. Directly behind the entrance, in the northwest corner, there is a 1.21 m deep and 1.4 m × 1.0 m large depression in the floor, which has been filled with debris and dust. This means that the original height of the room was probably 3.16 m, which would have provided enough space for the baldachin. Above the sarcophagus, a 40 cm deep cut in the rock runs from the ceiling 95 cm downward for a length of 2.60 m. This cut was partially filled with stone rubble when the chamber was used in its present state. Another cut, 75 cm deep and 2.76 m long, contained the canopic jar and was carefully sealed with masonry and plaster.

== Tomb equipment ==
Most of the objects found are now on display in the Egyptian Museum in Cairo. The objects bear both the inventory numbers JE (Journal d'Entrée du Musée) and RT (Registre Temporaire). Smaller pieces and faithful copies of larger objects can be found in the Museum of Fine Arts in Boston (MFA). Roman Gundacker divides the grave goods into two groups based on the inscriptions: On the one hand, those objects that originally belonged only to the court or to King Snofru and only came into their possession after his reign, and on the other hand, more recent objects whose date of manufacture falls into the reign of Khufu and thus presumably belonged to the household of Hetepheres as the king's mother. It remains unclear to what extent furniture and other grave goods were made specifically for the tomb.

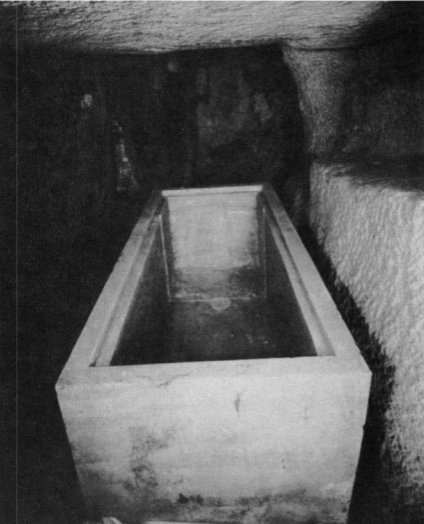
The opened alabaster sarcophagus (JE 51899) in the burial chamber

The uninscribed alabaster sarcophagus (JE 51899) stood on the east wall of the burial chamber, one meter behind the entrance. It measures 2 m × 85 cm with a height of 80 cm. The lid is 5 cm thick on the outside, but this is due to a 5 cm wide and 4 cm deep projection that held it in place. The ends of the lid had two protruding handles. The excavators found that a metal tool had been used along the top edge of the box to pry open the lid, and fragments of the top edge were found along the wall side, in a box filled with linen in the south corner of the tomb, and along the south wall of the tomb. These were the first indications that the contents of the coffin had been disturbed, and indeed it was found empty.

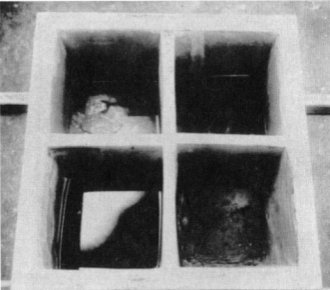
Canopic chest (JE 52452) with liquid after removing the lid

The alabaster canopic chest (JE 52452) stood in a recess in the west wall. It was set deep into the recess and sealed by the wall plaster. It rested on a small wooden sled from which the runners could be identified, but the sled was too poorly preserved for reconstruction. The square chest is 48.2 cm wide and 35 cm high. The lid has two small protruding handles and rests flat on the chest without any protrusion. The interior is divided by narrow walls into four compartments 26.2 cm deep. One contained decomposed organic matter, and three about 5 cm deep contained a yellowish liquid consisting of a 3 percent caustic soda solution. This contained the canopic jar containing Hetepheres' organs. In the center of the lid was a loam seal that secured a cord around the chest. The seal was protected by a small perforated ceramic lid. The clay surface was badly damaged. It certainly mentioned the "mortuary of Khufu", as did the other seals found in the tomb.

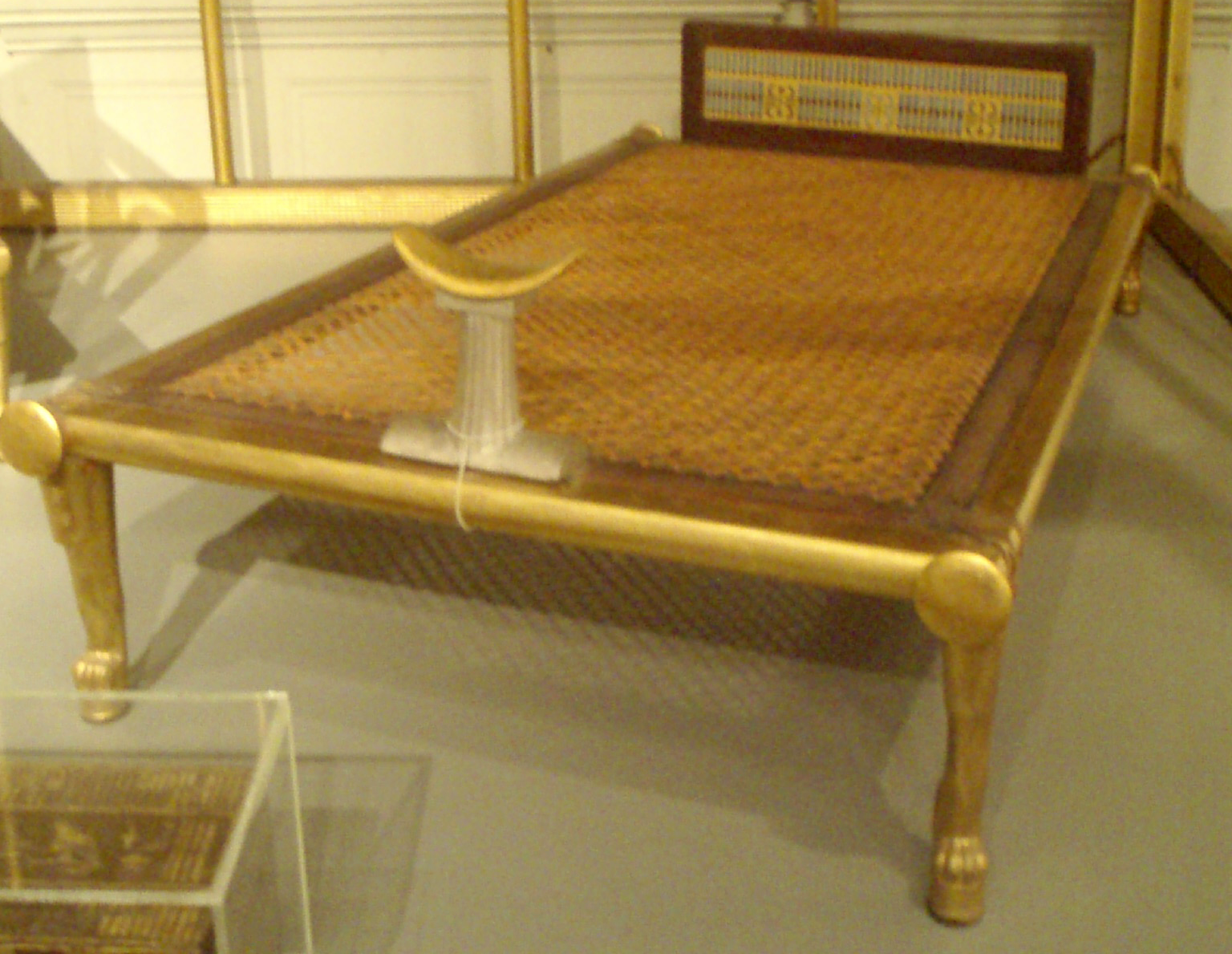
Faithful copy of the bed in the Museum of Fine Arts Boston after the original in the Egyptian Museum in Cairo (JE 53261).

The 1.778 m long and 97 cm wide bed (JE 53261) slopes from the headboard to the footboard from a height of 35.5 cm to 21.5 cm at the footboard. Except for the feet and the lying surface, the wooden bed is covered with gold leaf. As was customary in ancient Egypt, it did not have a headboard, but a wooden panel at the foot end, which was attached to the bed frame by two copper-covered wooden pegs in recesses also covered with copper. The inside of the footboard is the only part that is decorated with alternating inlaid feathers and rosettes in the typical blue-green and black colors. The feet, in the shape of the lion's legs, face the headboard and are attached to the sides with thin leather cords. The headboard, decorated with gold and silver, was kept in a golden box.

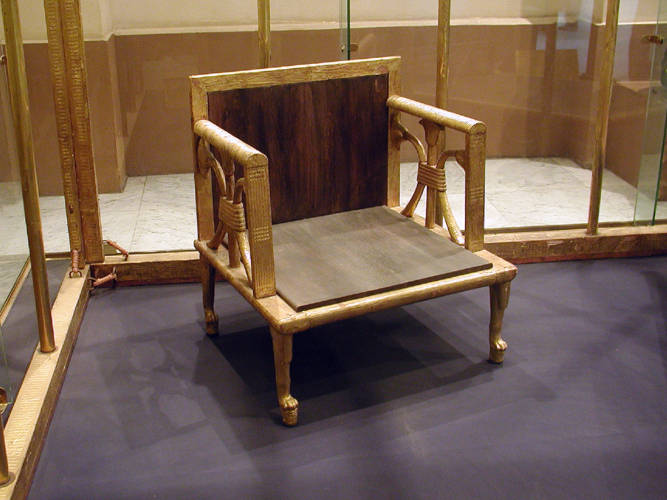
Armchair (JE 53263) of Hetepheres in the Egyptian Museum in Cairo

The furniture included two armchairs whose wood had completely disintegrated. One of the armchairs (JE 53263) originally had its back to the alabaster sarcophagus. Except for the seat and back, it was completely covered in gold. The natural wood panels could be reconstructed from the gold covering. The front supports of the armrests show a simple mat pattern. The armrests are made of three papyrus stems bound together. The feet are shaped like a lion's paws. Since the front legs are 28 cm higher than the back legs, which are 26 cm high, the seat slopes slightly backward. The legs are also quite deep and the seat is very wide and deep. Overall, the frame is 79.5 cm high, 71 cm wide, and 66 cm deep.

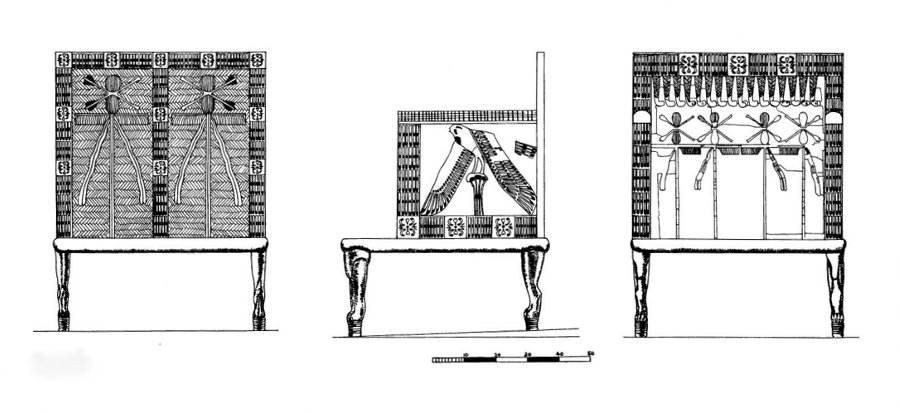
Reconstructed drawings of the second chair (Temp. Reg. 22.2.60) after Reisner

The more valuable of the two chairs (temp. reg. 22.2.60) was irretrievably destroyed and could only be partially reconstructed. The position of the very fragmentary lion's feet indicates that it originally stood at right angles to the first, facing the entrance, with its back to the bed and the palanquin. The latter was decorated not only with a simple gilding, but also with inlays of different colors. The armrests were each decorated with a Horus falcon standing on a palm tree with outstretched wings. The back was decorated with the standards of the goddess Neith.

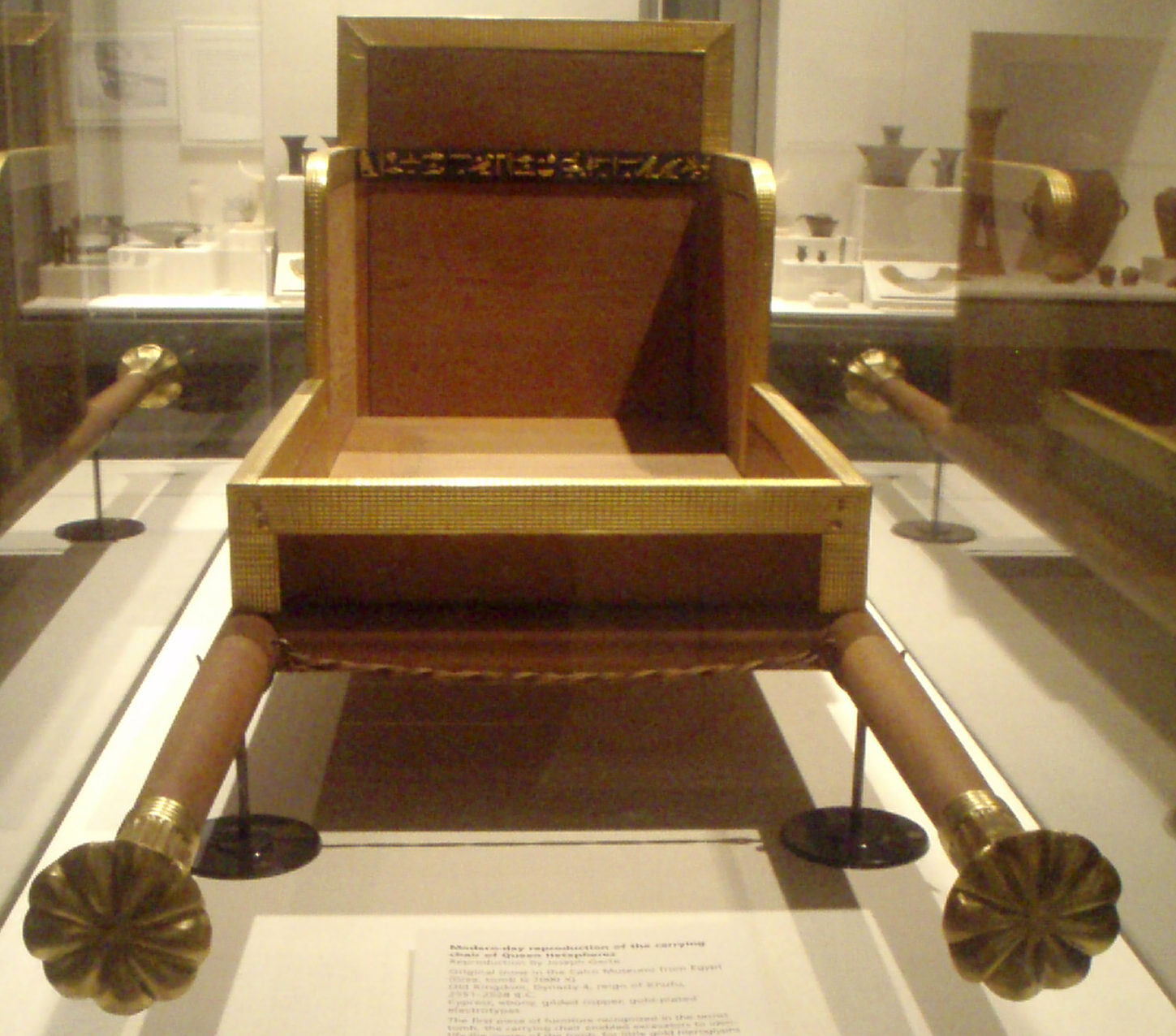
Faithful copy of Hetepheres' palanquin in the Museum of Fine Arts Boston after the original in the Egyptian Museum in Cairo (JE 52372)

The wood of the palanquin (JE 52372) is even better preserved than that of the bed, although it has shrunk to about one-sixth of its original volume. It is 99 cm long, 53.5 cm wide and 52 cm high. The wooden construction was gilded at all corners and decorated with geometric reliefs. The seat could be pulled out to allow the queen to stretch her legs. On both sides of the backrest, at the height of the armrests, was the following inscription in gold hieroglyphics on black ebony: "Mother of the King of Upper and Lower Egypt, daughter of Horus, entrusted with the affairs of Imat, the one for whom the word was created, daughter of God, Hetepheres". The wooden construction was held together with leather straps and copper-coated pegs. Palm-shaped finials were attached to the ends of the supporting poles.

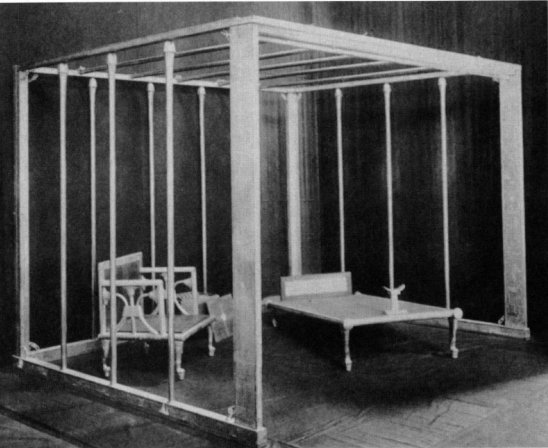
Reconstructed baldachin in the Egyptian Museum in Cairo (JE 57711)

The dismantled parts of a gilded wooden frame of a baldachin (JE 57711) lay partly on the sarcophagus and partly between the coffin and the east wall. As the wood rotted, the gold coating fell onto the pottery in this area. The box for the canopy (JE 72030) stood on the western edge of the coffin lid and disintegrated in situ. However, the inlaid decoration was found intact and in its original arrangement, allowing the reconstruction of the facade. Each of the long sides bears an inscription, separated into two mirror-image parts by two representations of the vulture goddess Nekhbet. The canopy could be disassembled relatively quickly and reassembled at another location by inserting the poles through the copper-plated pegs into the copper recesses. Hangers were attached to the top of the frame at regular intervals on all four sides, apparently for attaching curtains to the inside of the canopy and a cloth to cover them. No remains of the curtains were found. It is possible that they were originally stored in the box. The canopy must have formed a space in which the bed and perhaps other furniture were placed, perhaps for privacy or protection from insects. The gold casing was mainly decorated with mat patterns, except for the smooth surface of the bars and the inside of the door frame, which were inscribed with the title and name of Snofru.

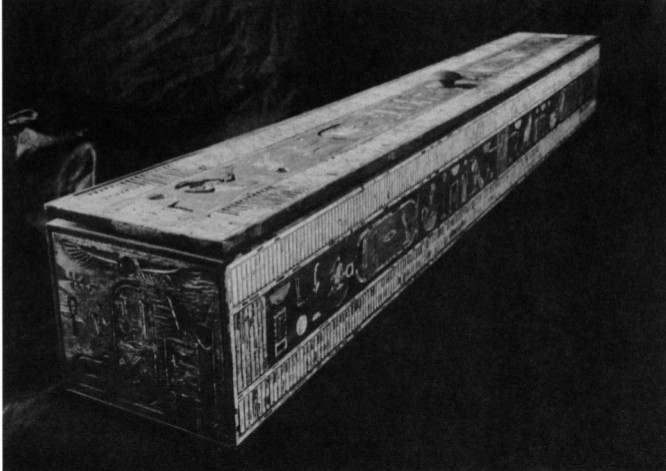
The large wooden chest (Temp. Reg. 22.2.60)

The objects lying around to the south of the first chair all rested on a layer of rotten wood. On top of these objects were pieces of beadwork, inlays, and gold leaf. These could be reconstructed as a lid and a large wooden chest (temp. reg. 22.2.60), which originally contained all the objects lying around.

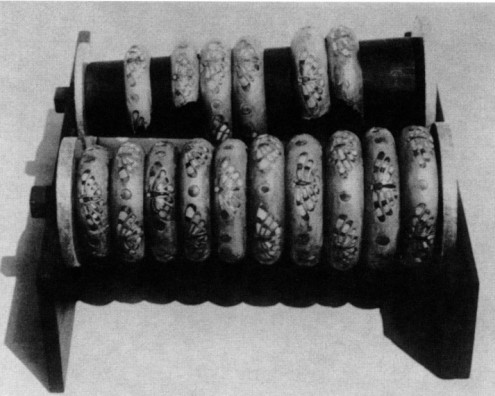
Bracelets (JE 53265–81; MFA 47.1699) on a reconstructed mount...

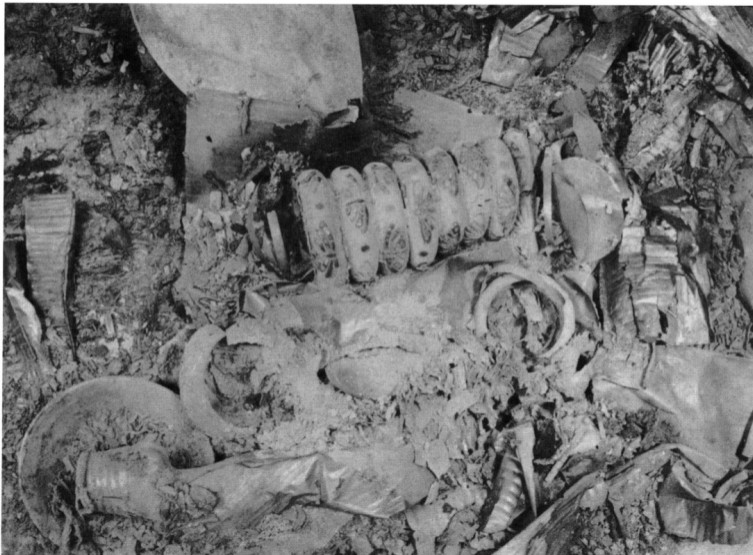
...and in situ

The contents of the large chest included a small box of bangles (JE 53265–81; MFA 47.1699). It is 33.7 cm wide, 41.9 cm long and 21.8 cm high including the lid. The wood is lined inside and out with ribbed gold leaf and matted patterns on the edges. The silver bracelets are inlaid with carnelian, lapis lazuli, and turquoise. Stylized butterflies with outstretched wings form the decoration. Originally, 20 bracelets were lined up on the two cylinders of the box, divided into groups of ten. The lid has a small ivory knob in the center to open the box. On both sides, there is an inscription in hieroglyphics. On the left side, it reads: "Mother of the King of Upper and Lower Egypt, Hetepheres" and on the right side: "Box with bracelets". Below the inscription on the right side, a scribe has written the word "bracelets" in black ink, perhaps during an inspection of the tomb equipment.

The large chest also contained a copper wash jug and basin, two stone vessels, two clay vessels, the wooden headrest with gold and silver overlay (JE 53262), a wooden box with a calcite ointment jar (JE 52373), gold and silver plates, razors and other gold and copper cosmetic items, and ivory bracelets.

To the west of the chest was another group of fragments that could be assembled into a tubular leather case (JE 89619) with metal-studded discs at the top and bottom. It contained two long sticks with ribbed gold casings and a third wooden stick inlaid with a pattern of Min emblems. The gold casing of one of the walking sticks could be reconstructed to a length of 102 cm.

The grave furnishings included around eight other wooden caskets with linen, pottery, stone vessels, clay seals, and flints. There were also two groups of tools lying around, probably left by the workers, including chisels, bones made into tools, copper utensils, and a knife with a wooden handle. Numerous seal fragments bearing the name of Khufu indicate that he commissioned the tomb furnishings.

The tomb of Hetepheres provides a large corpus of ceramic vessels in a well-dated context, making it particularly valuable for archaeological analysis. It complements the corpus from the mastaba tombs which Reisner used to classify the pottery of the Old Kingdom. In the tomb of Hetepheres, he identified a total of 281 ceramic vessels, which he classified into 17 types.

A total of 39 stone vessels were also found, all made of alabaster. Only one of the 26 larger vessels had been polished, while the others had only been smoothed. The 13 small cosmetic vessels were better treated, but the surface of several of them had been damaged by moisture.

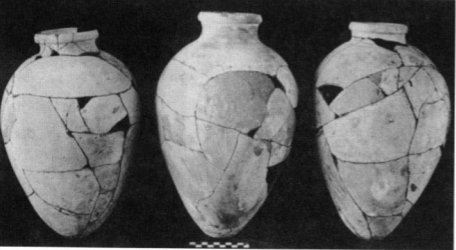
Large wine jugs

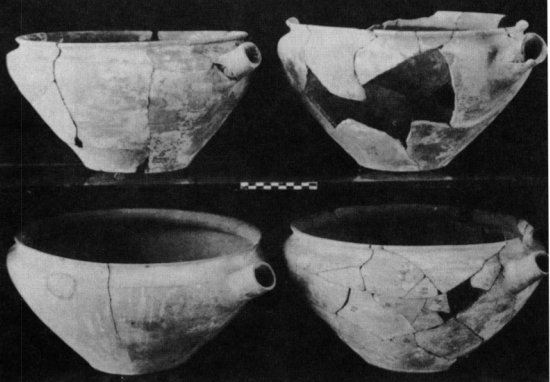
Bowls with spout

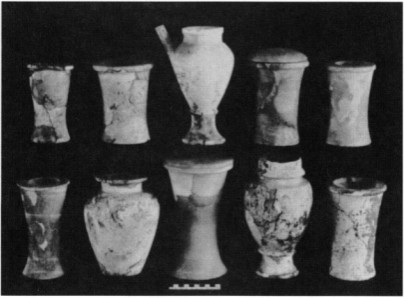
Alabaster vessels

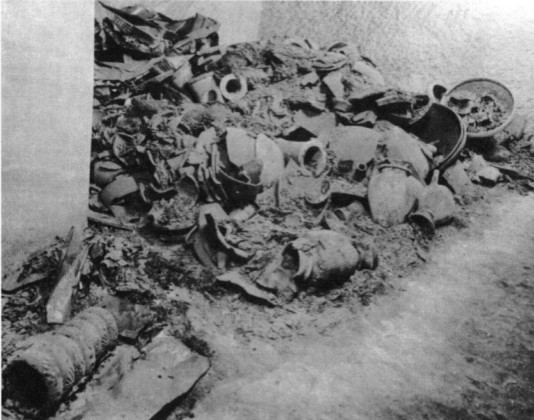
Alabaster vessels in situ

== Interpretation of the findings ==
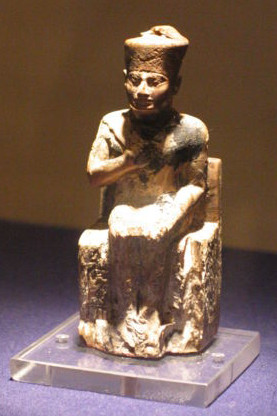
King Khufu, whose mother was Hetepheres

The tomb furnishings of Hetepheres have some special features:

- There is no evidence of a superstructure: such a substructure would normally have a superstructure to mark the location and where offerings could be made to the deceased. This tomb in particular would have been expected to have a superstructure since it contained the tomb furnishings and Hetepheres was a person of great importance, perhaps the most important woman at the royal court. However, a superstructure could never have been built because of its proximity to the pyramids of the queens.
- The sarcophagus was found empty but still showed yellowish stains due to sodium bicarbonate solution and thus burial. In contrast, the tomb still contained the mummified viscera. Thus, the body had been removed from the tomb, but not the internal organs.
- The sarcophagus and the canopic jar were placed incorrectly: The sarcophagus had been placed on the east side instead of the usual west side and the canopic jar should have been placed to the south of the sarcophagus.
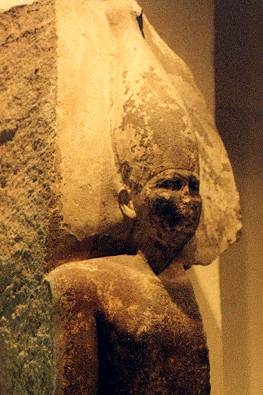
- King Sneferu, whose wife is generally believed to be Hetepheres.
  The queens were usually buried next to their husband's pyramid. Queen Hetepheres would therefore have been expected to be buried in Dahshur next to a pyramid of Snofru.
- Architecturally, the tomb shows similarities with the elite tombs of the 3rd Dynasty in Meidum and Dahshur, especially the staircase at the foot of the shaft.
- Contrary to the customs of Khufu's time, the walls were not clad with stone slabs.

=== Robbed tomb in Dahshur relocated to Giza ===
George Andrew Reisner was also known in Egyptological circles as a reader of detective novels. The discovery of the tomb of Hetepheres allowed him to solve a "case" himself. He assumed that Hetepheres had survived her husband Sneferu. After her death, her son Khufu first had her buried near Sneferu in Dahshur. Shortly after her burial, tomb robbers broke into the tomb and stole the mummy because of its rich furnishings and gold trappings, but had fled before taking the rest of her treasures. Khufu was likely informed of the situation, but Reisner speculated that in order to avoid the wrath of the king, a clever minister concealed the fact that the mummy had been stolen, and instead told Khufu that her mummy was still safely inside the sarcophagus. The minister then had the sarcophagus closed again to hide the fact that the body was missing. To give his mother a more secure resting place, Khufu had a secret tomb built for her in Giza near his pyramid. All of her tomb furnishings were moved from her old tomb to her new tomb, where they remained until they were discovered. This interpretation goes far beyond the archaeological facts, but it was already considered a historical fact.

Mark Lehner argues against Reisner's theory that it is not plausible that the tomb of Hetepheres was moved to Giza as a precaution against further looting of the original tomb at Dahshur. Moreover, a tomb could hardly have been kept secret during the construction of the Great Pyramid of Khufu. Furthermore, a tomb without a superstructure contradicts the ideas of the afterlife at that time. It can also be assumed that the sarcophagus was opened by skilled personnel, as grave robbers would probably have simply smashed it to pieces. The circumstances suggest a hasty burial, for example after the unexpected death of the queen, rather than an orderly reburial.

=== Emergency grave ===
Mark Lehner thought it possible that the Queen Mother died at a time when the three Queen Pyramids were not yet completed. The circumstances of her death meant that the tomb furnishings had to be hastily prepared. Lehner considered a pit carved into the rock south of G I-a and east of G 7000x, which he called G I-x, to be the unfinished entrance to a pyramid that was never built. According to this, G 7000x and G I-x were part of the same unfinished tomb complex of Queen Hetepheres I. At a later date, the mummy was moved to a new tomb complex with new tomb furnishings. Her original grave goods were left in the rock chamber of G 7000x.

On the other hand, it can be argued that such an important utensil as the canopic jar would hardly be left behind when moving to a new tomb. It is also possible that the tomb was reused as an old 3rd Dynasty tomb with an existing alabaster sarcophagus and canopic jar under Khufu to temporarily store the mummy of Hetepheres. The canopic jar contained the entrails of an original burial, while Hetepheres' canopic jar was transported with the mummy to her new tomb. This tomb could have been the northern side Pyramid G I-a. The attribution of the two depressions to one and the same tomb remains highly speculative. The plan of the substructure of the alleged pyramid complex G I-x and G 7000x would be fundamentally different from those of other queen pyramids of this period. Furthermore, there is no evidence for the existence of a pyramid above G I-x.

=== Throne confusion ===
In addition, the generally assumed marriage relationship between Hetepheres and Sneferu cannot be proven, although seal impressions in the tomb of Hetepheres I show a close relationship to the kings Sneferu and Khufu. The important title of the King's Wife (ḥmt-nswt - hemet-nisut) is not documented for her. Instead, she bears other important titles, including the first documented title of "Daughter of God" (z3t-nṯr - sat-netjer) with the addition of "of his body" (nt-ẖt.f - net-chet.ef). Peter Jánosi therefore suggests that Khufu's accession to the throne may not have been legitimate: "This strange title and the absence of the ḥmt-nswt title suggest that Khufu was not a direct descendant of Sneferu and that he traced his lineage back to a divine lineage (son of a "daughter of God") with the help of a "pseudo-genealogical" title of his mother (z3t-nṯr-nt-ẖt.f) to establish his lineage and thus his claim to rule." Hetepheres could therefore have been a "concubine" without any claim to queen status or a relative of Sneferu. In this context, it should also be understood that it was necessary for Khufu "to have his mother's tomb placed in his pyramid complex at Giza, concealing his actual biological origins and lacking a suitable burial place with his predecessor".

Furthermore, the title "Head of the Slayers of the House of Acacia" attests to Hetepheres' function in the death cult of a king. This refers to Sneferu, which also shows that she survived him. Roman Gundacker concludes that she "could not have been buried anywhere else but in Giza." Nevertheless, she may have had a tomb in Dahshur or Meidum that corresponded to her position before Khufu became king. However, by the time Khufu became king, she no longer had the rank of a royal mother.
