= Bust of Ankhhaf =

Ancient Egyptian sculpture

Ankhhaf
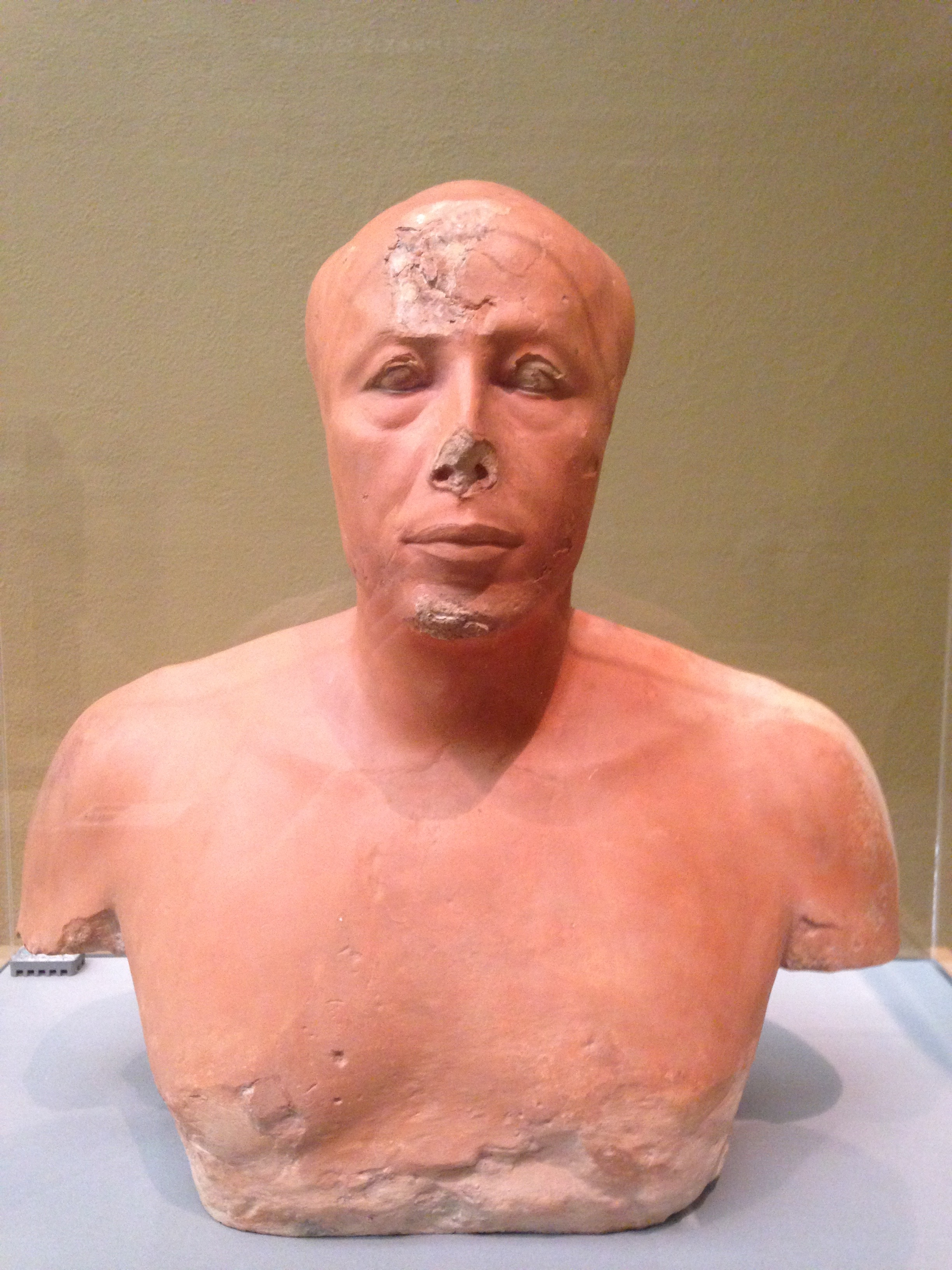
- Bust of Prince Ankhhaf, at the Museum of Fine Arts, Boston
- Artist: "A master artist"
- Year: c. 2510 BC
- Catalogue: Museum Expedition 27.442
- Medium: Painted limestone
- Subject: Ankhhaf
- Location: Museum of Fine Arts, Boston

The painted limestone bust of Ankhhaf is an ancient Egyptian sculpture dating from the Old Kingdom. It is considered the work "of a master" of ancient Egyptian art, and can be seen at the Museum of Fine Arts, Boston. Its catalog number is Museum Expedition 27.442.

== Description ==
It depicts a mature man and was therefore likely made during the reign of Khafre (circa 2520–2494 BC). One of the earliest – and even after four and a half thousand years, still among the finest – true sculptured portraits, it is an almost unprecedented depiction of the unidealised features of an actual man. Sculptures portraying true likenesses of people (rather than highly stylized portrayals) are rare in Ancient Egyptian art, both before and after the creation of Ankhhaf's bust. Plaster covers a limestone core, which has been painted red, a colour commonly given to males in both sculpture and in reliefs (figures of women were typically painted yellow). The face is stern, with a slightly uneven mouth which makes him appear as though he is smirking from one side, and aloof and impersonal from the other. There is a slight droop to the eyelids, whose eyes were once painted white with brown pupils. The figure once had a beard and ears, which were broken away in antiquity along with part of the figure's nose. The skin colour has been to some extent restored to make it appear more even, and the receding hair (which forms the slight 'bulge' on either side of the upper skull) would originally have been indicated in black or another dark colour.

== Site of discovery ==
The bust was discovered in his tomb, installed within a small chapel oriented to the east and facing the chapel's doorway. His arms may have been sculpted on the small pedestal on which it sat, though these have been lost. It was evident that it had once been the focus of a funerary cult, as the bust had crushed several small pottery vessels of the type used for offerings when it fell in antiquity from its pedestal.

== Method of discovery ==
The bust was discovered in 1925 by a museum expedition funded jointly by the Museum of Fine Arts, Boston and Harvard University, and under the contract of the time, such a fine piece would normally have found a home at the Egyptian Museum in Cairo. However, this piece was awarded in 1927 by the Egyptian government as thanks for the extensive work done by this expedition and the discovery of the intact royal tomb of Queen Hetepheres, who was Ankhhaf's aunt, a sister of his father. More recently, Zahi Hawass, the chief of Egypt's Supreme Council of Antiquities, has asked that this piece be repatriated to Egypt, as one of five key items belonging to Egypt's cultural heritage, a list which also includes the iconic bust of Nefertiti in the Egyptian Museum of Berlin, a statue of the Great Pyramid architect Hemiunu in the Roemer-und-Pelizaeus-Museum in Hildesheim, Germany, and the Dendara Temple Zodiac in the Louvre in Paris.

== Gallery of images ==
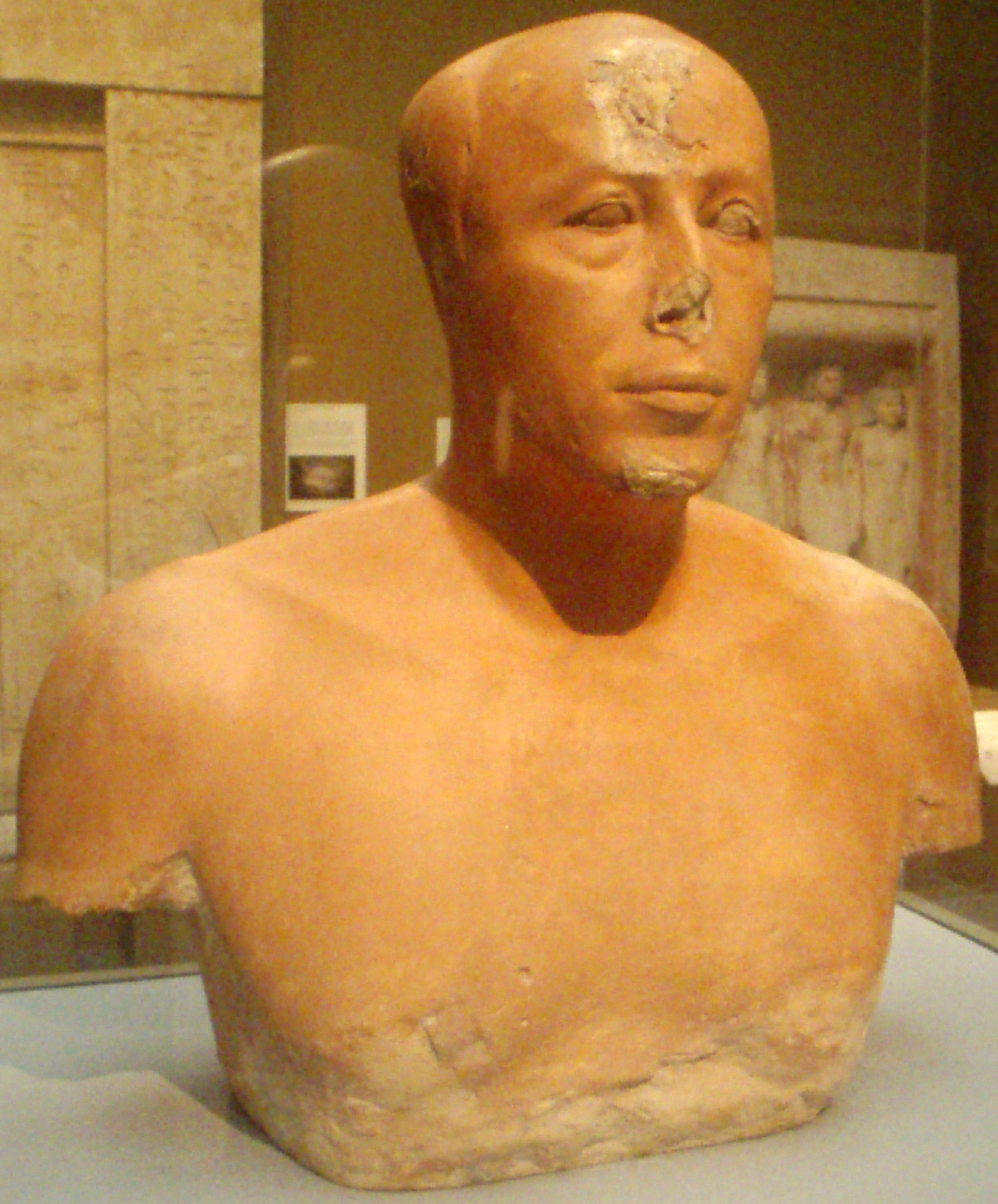
The bust of Prince Ankhhaf seen in partial profile from his right, on display at the Museum of Fine Arts, Boston

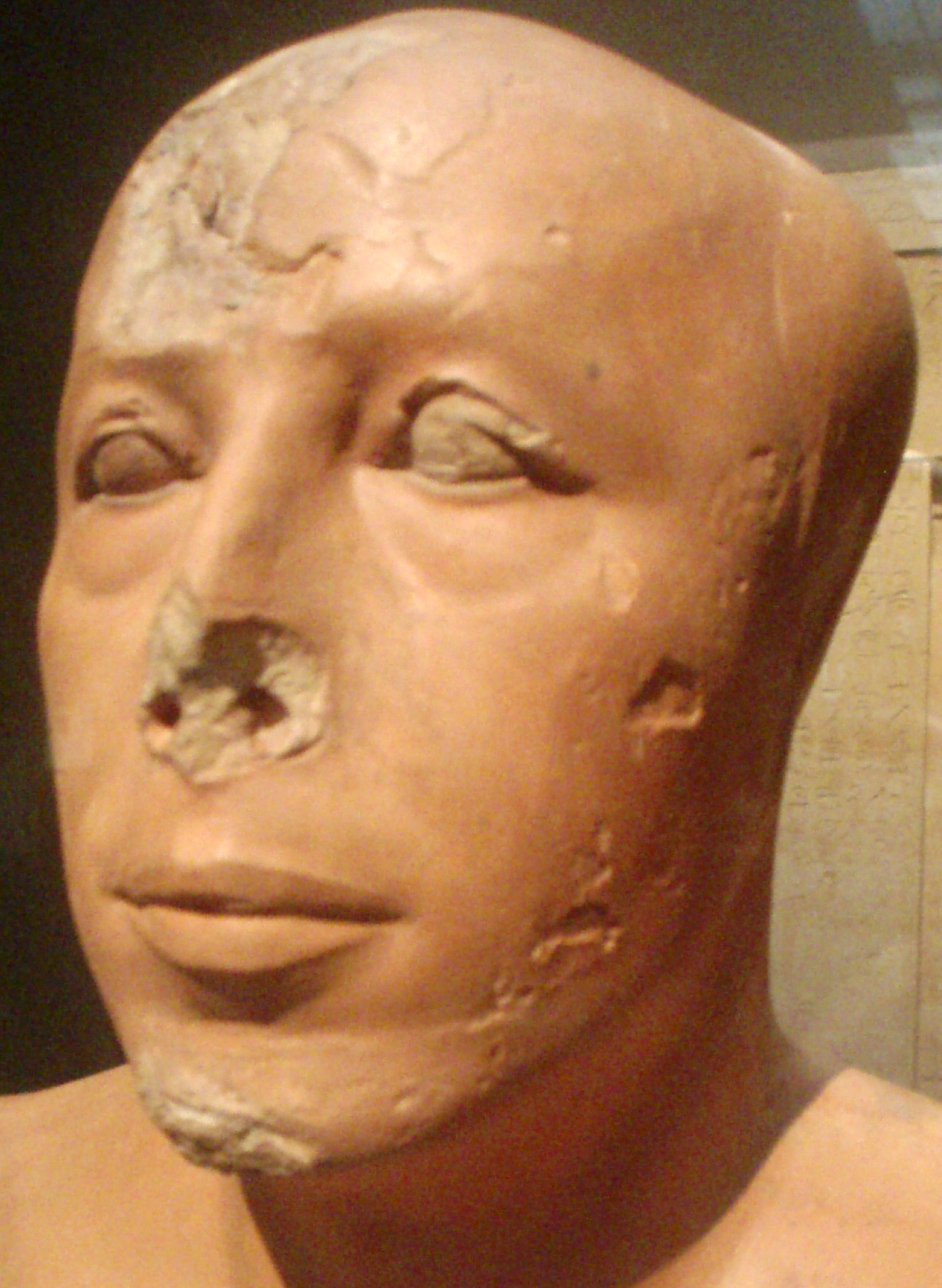
The bust of Prince Ankhhaf seen close-up and in partial profile from his left, on display at the Museum of Fine Arts, Boston

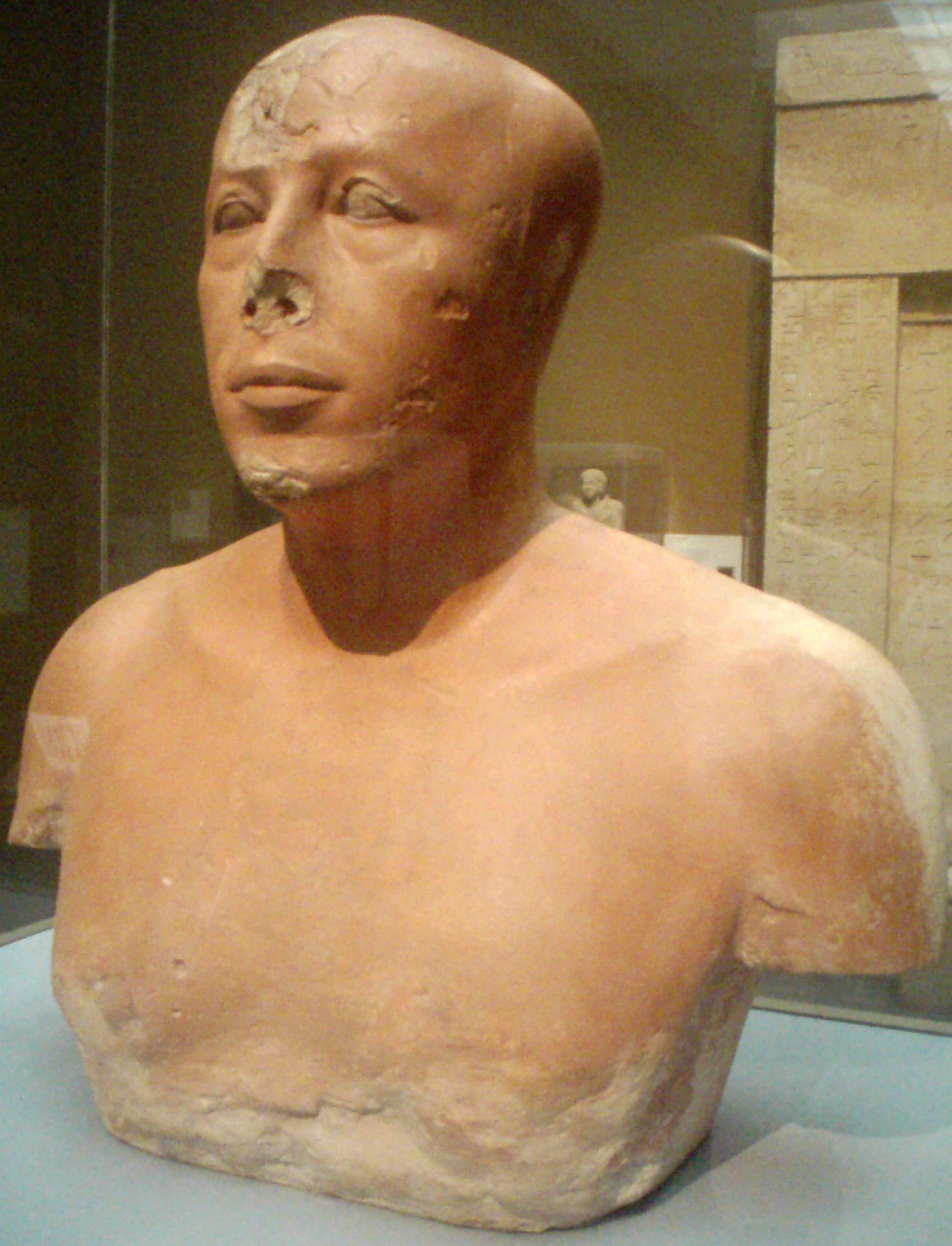
The bust of Prince Ankhhaf seen in partial profile from his left, on display at the Museum of Fine Arts, Boston

== External link ==
Bust of Ankhaf in the official Boston museum of art homepage
