= Ranefer =

Egyptian prince

Ranefer in hieroglyphs
D21 D36 nfr
Rˀ-nfr
Ra-nefer
Ra is beautiful

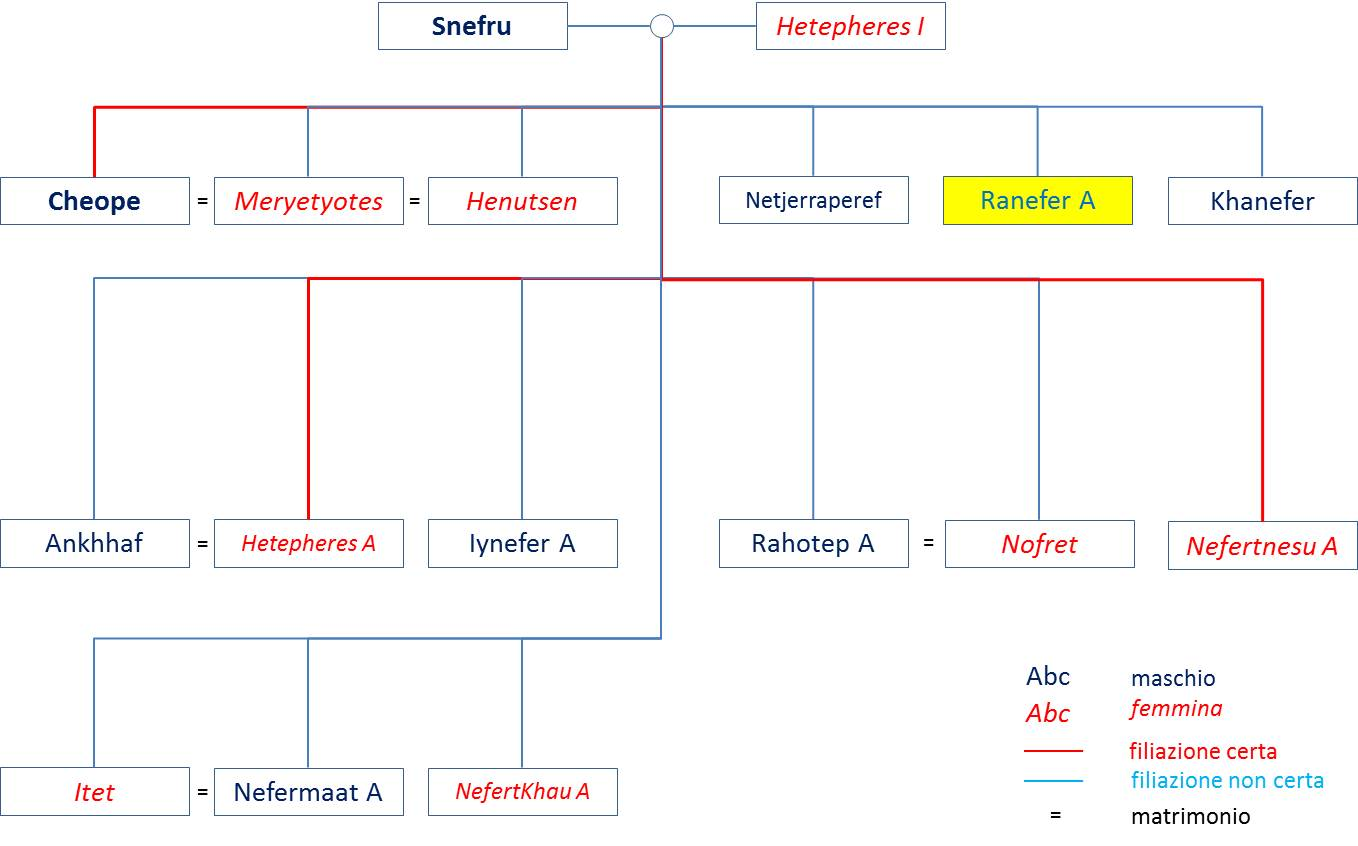
Ranefer in a family tree

Ranefer (or Ranofer) was a prince of ancient Egypt during the 4th Dynasty (Old Kingdom of Egypt).

His name, Ranefer, comes from the Egyptian god Ra and the Ancient Egyptian word nefer (nfr), meaning "beauty."

Ranefer, who had the title King’s Son, was a son of Pharaoh Sneferu, who was the first ruler of the Fourth Dynasty. Ranefer's mother was Sneferu's wife or concubine; her name is unknown. Ranefer's elder brothers were Nefermaat I and Rahotep.

Ranefer worked as an overseer for his father (title: “Overseer of Djed-Sneferu”) and was buried inside a mastaba tomb at Meidum. In the tomb were found remains of viscera wrapped in linen. Ranefer's body is the best representation of what mummification techniques entailed during the Old Kingdom. His body was facing east, was molded as well as painted. The mummy's hair was painted black, the eyebrows and eyes were painted green whilst the mouth was painted red. The genitals were also carefully molded, the brain remained in the skull and its innards were found in a canopic chest in the tomb.
