= Hetepheres (princess) =

Egyptian princess

Hetepheres A
- Princess of Egypt
- Spouse: Prince Ankhhaf
- Issue: Daughter
- Father: Sneferu
- Mother: Hetepheres I

Hetepheres in hieroglyphs
Htp t p Hr r s
Hetepheres
ḥtp-ḥr.s

Princess Hetepheres (or Hetepheres A) was an Egyptian princess who lived during the 4th Dynasty. Hetepheres was the daughter of King Sneferu and the wife of vizier Ankhhaf.

== Biography ==
Princess Hetepheres A was a daughter of Pharaoh Sneferu and her mother was Queen Hetepheres I. Princess Hetepheres married her younger half-brother Ankhhaf, who was a vizier. Hetepheres is depicted in Ankhhaf's tomb in Giza (G 7510). Hetepheres had the titles "eldest king's daughter of his body", "the one whom he loves" and "Priestess of Sneferu". She would have been a person of some importance as the wife of a vizier and as the sister of Pharaoh Khufu.

Ankhhaf and Hetepheres had a daughter, who was a mother of Ankhetef. This grandson is depicted in the tomb for Ankhhaf and Hetepheres.

== Tomb ==
Hetepheres' husband Ankhhaf had a large mastaba numbered G 7510 in the Giza East Field. The decoration includes the depiction of a grandson, implying that the tomb was constructed and decorated later in the life of Ankhhaf. There is no burial shaft for Hetepheres in this tomb, and she may have died before the completion of the tomb and may have been buried elsewhere.
