= Ankhhaf =

Egyptian prince and vizier

- Prince of Egypt; Vizier of Egypt
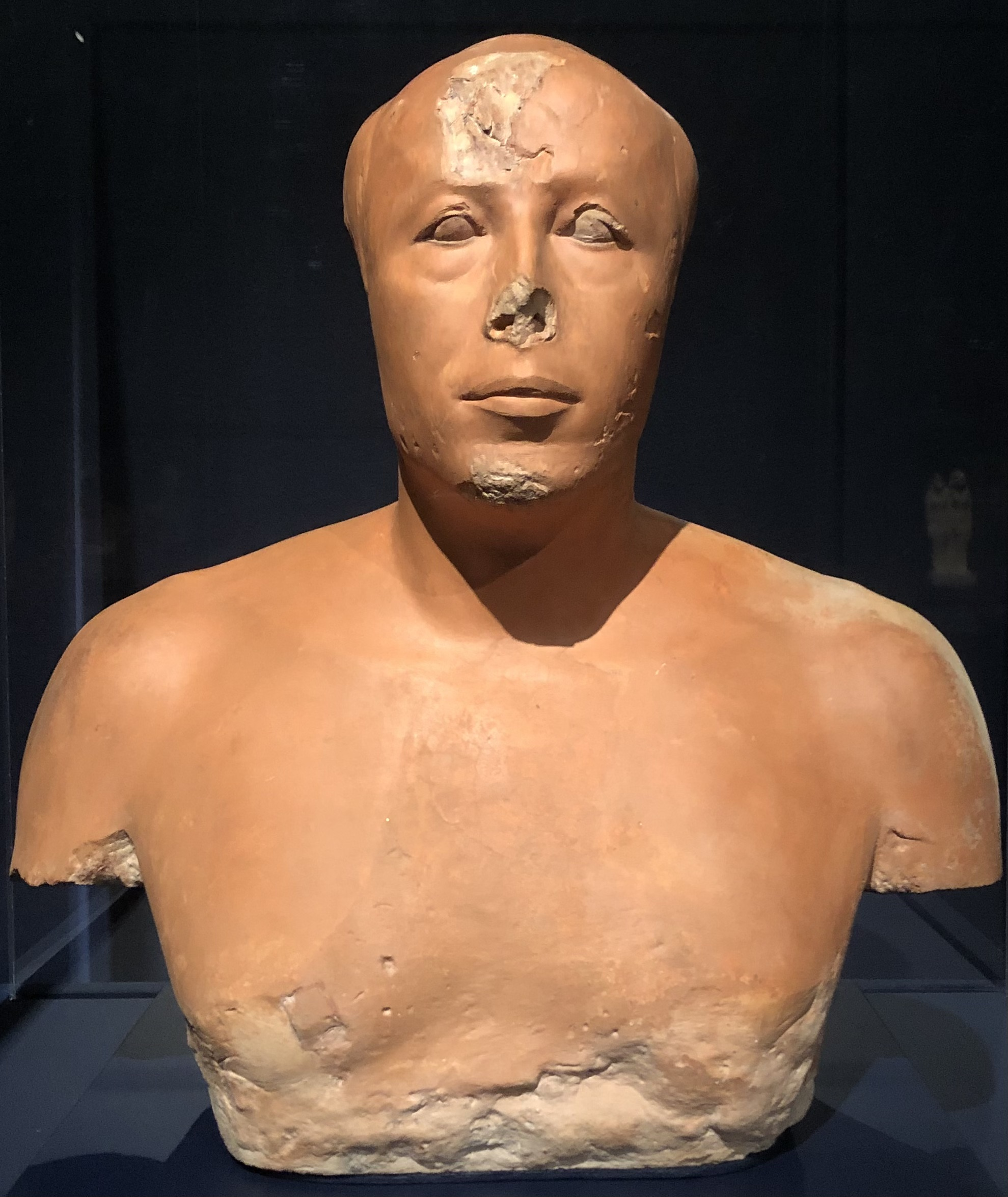
- Bust of Prince Ankhhaf, now at the Museum of Fine Arts, Boston
Egyptian name
anx HA f
- Dynasty: 4th
- Pharaoh: Khufu; Djedefre; Khafre
- Burial: Mastaba G 7510, Giza
- Spouse: Hetepheres A
- Father: Sneferu

Ankhhaf was an Egyptian prince and served as an overseer during the reign of the Pharaoh Khufu, who is thought to have been Ankhhaf's half-brother. One of Ankhhaf's titles is also as a vizier, but it is unknown under which pharaoh he would have held this title. He lived during Egypt's 4th Dynasty (c. 2613 to c. 2494 BC).

== Family ==
Ankhhaf was likely a son of the pharaoh Sneferu and an unknown wife. Ankhhaf's tomb in Giza (G 7510) depicts his sister-wife Princess Hetepheres. Hetepheres is thought to have been the eldest daughter of Sneferu and Queen Hetepheres I and thus Ankhhaf's half-sister. Hetepheres had the titles "eldest king's daughter of his body", "the one whom he loves" (sat nswt n khtf smst mrt.f) and "Priestess of Sneferu" (hmt-nTr Snfrw). Ankhhaf and Hetepheres had a daughter, who was the mother of their grandson Ankhetef.

== Career ==
Ankhhaf had the titles "eldest king's son of his body" (sa nswt n khtf smsw), "vizier" and "the great one of Five of the house of Thoth" (wr djw pr-Djehuti).

Ankhhaf is thought to have been involved with the building of the Great Pyramid of Giza and likely played a role in the construction of the Sphinx. In 2013 a collection of papyri fragments, the Diary of Merer, was discovered at the ancient Harbor of Khufu at Wadi al-Jarf. The logs from an inspector named Merer appear to date from the 27th year of Khufu's reign and record months worth of operations transporting limestone from Tura to Giza. The records refer to an administrative center named Ro-She Khufu ('Mouth [ie 'entrance'] of the Lake of Khufu'] which was under the authority of the Vizier Ankhhaf. The 'Lake of Khufu' was a large artificial lake or harbour excavated in front of the escarpment on which the Great Pyramid and its associated monuments stand. A canal connected it to the Nile, which at this time ran considerably closer to the Pyramid Escarpment. These enormous hydrological works, and associated administrative buildings and storehouses, allowed cargo boats to approach as close as possible to the construction site, bringing building stone, supplies for the workers and other necessities. According to Egyptologist Pierre Tallet, this would place Ankhhaf in charge of the construction of the pyramid towards the end of the project. Though the diary does not specify, Tallet believes the operations refer to the delivery of the Tura limestone used for the casing. In the papyrus Ankhkhaf is called nobleman (iry-pat) and overseer of Ra-shi-Khufu. The latter place was the harbor at Giza where the stones for the pyramid building arrived.

== Tomb ==
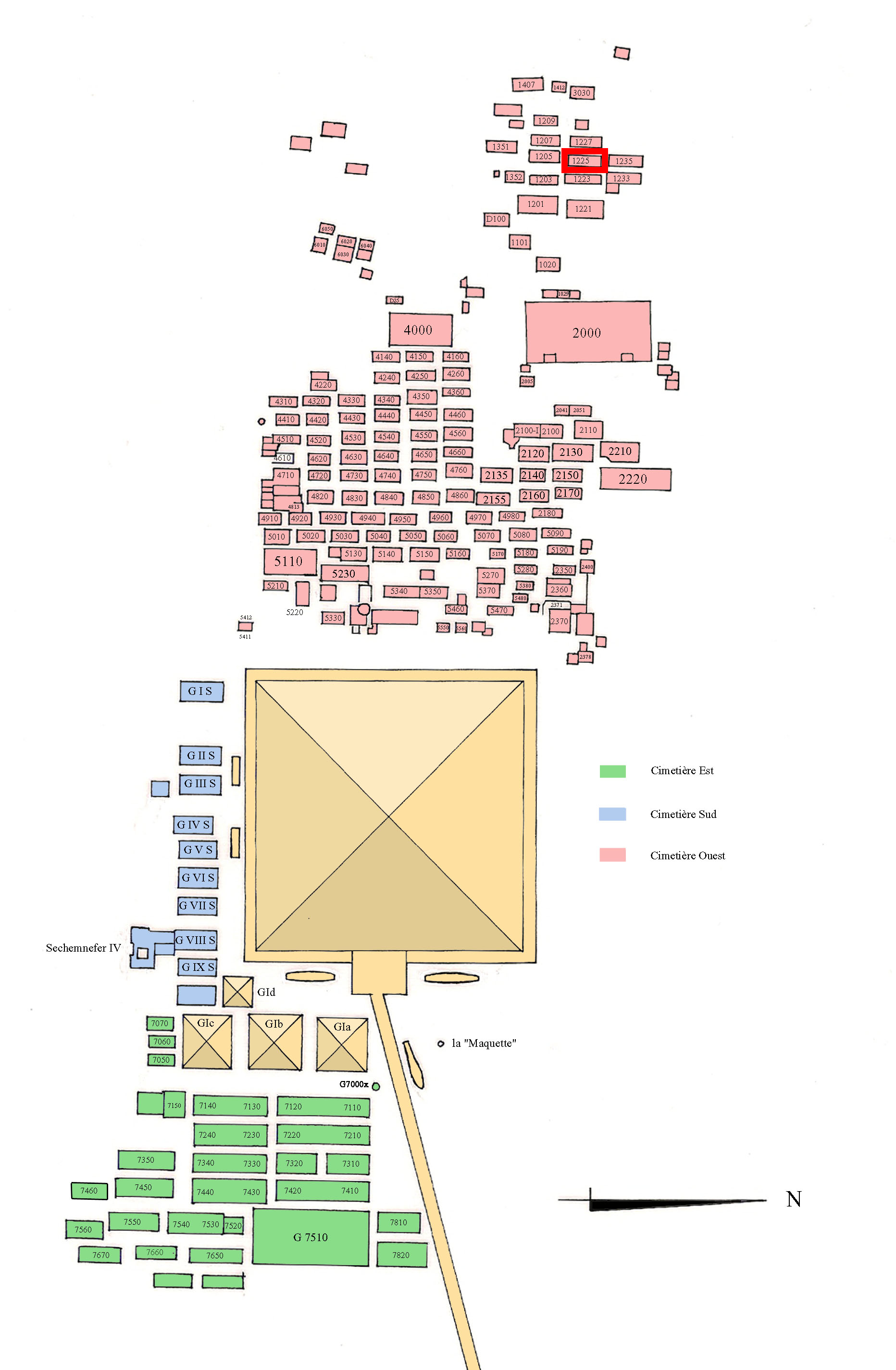
Tomb G 7510 is located in the east side(depicted in green) compared to the Great Pyramid of Giza as shown in the centre of the picture.

Ankhaf's mastaba tomb, G 7510, was one of the largest in the eastern cemetery at Giza. The tomb was dated to the reign of Khafre by Reisner. More recently a study of the architecture, iconography and titles of the occupants has led to a reassessment and the tomb likely spans the reigns of Khufu, Djedefre and Khafre.

A superb and realistic painted limestone portrait bust of Ankhhaf discovered in his tomb is considered the work "of a master" of ancient Egyptian art from the time of the Old Kingdom, and can be seen at the Museum of Fine Arts, Boston. Its catalog number is Museum Expedition 27.442.
