= Hetepheres I =

Htp t p Hr r s
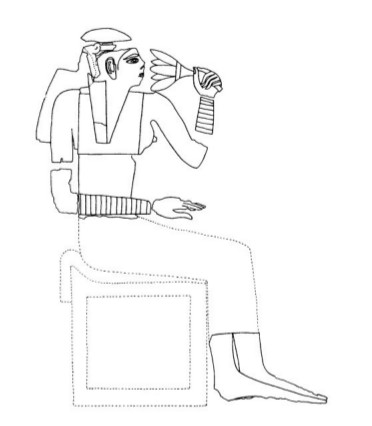
- Gold figure of Hetepheres from her Giza tomb - drawing by George Reisner, 1925

Queen consort of Egypt
- Tenure: c. 2600 BC
- Spouse: Sneferu
- Issue: Khufu, Hetepheres
- Father: Huni
- Religion: Ancient Egyptian religion

Hetepheres I (fl. c. 2600 BC) was a queen of Egypt during the Fourth Dynasty of Egypt who was a wife of one king, the mother of the next king, the grandmother of two more kings, and the figure who tied together two dynasties.

== Biography ==
Hetepheres I may have been a wife of King Sneferu, and was the mother of King Khufu and grandmother of king Khafre. It is possible that Hetepheres had been a minor wife of Sneferu and only rose in prominence after her son ascended the throne. She was the grandmother of two kings, Djedefre and Khafre, and of queen Hetepheres II. Her titles include: King's Mother (Mut-nisut, mwt-nswt), Mother of the King of the Two Lands (Mut-nisut-biti, mwt-nswt-bjtj), Attendant of Horus (Khet-heru, ḫt-hrw), and God's Daughter of his body (Zat-netjer-net-khetef, zꜣt-nṯr-nt-ẖt.f). The marriage of Hetepheres I to Snefru solidified his rise to the throne. Because she carried the royal bloodline from one dynasty to the next, two great royal lines were joined when they married. Her title as "God's Daughter of his body" refers to her father, Huni, who ruled at the end of the Third Dynasty and was deified. She married Sneferu and gave birth to the next king, Khufu, who commissioned her tomb and pyramid. The mothers of Ancient Egyptian kings held special status. Her later titles arose from her relationship to her son and his role as king.

== Tomb ==
=== Discovery ===
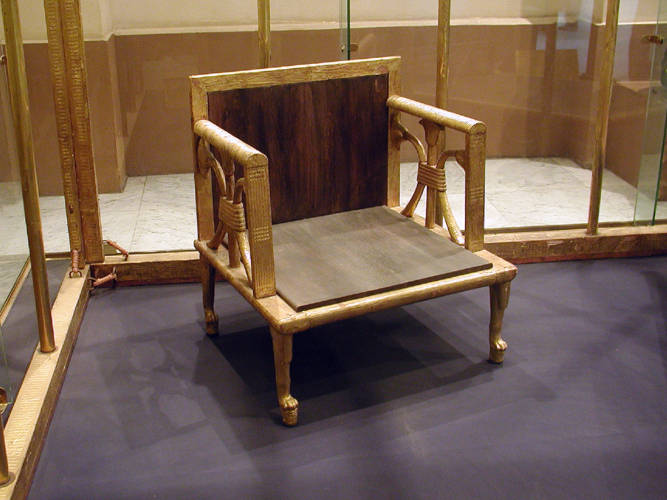
Armchair of Queen Hetepheres from the Cairo Museum.

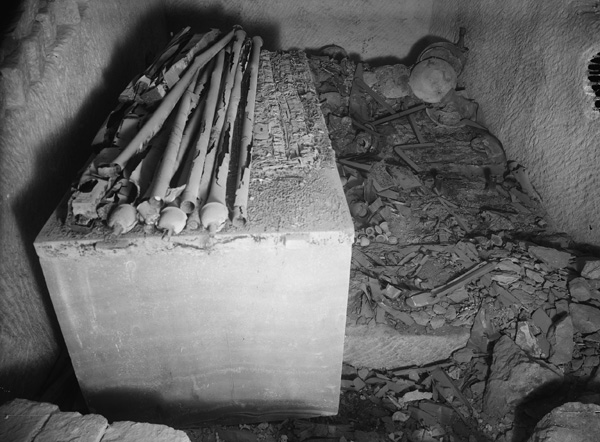
Tomb G 7000X of Hetepheres I, burial chamber, looking South (1926)

Starting in 1902, a joint expedition of Harvard University and the Boston Museum of Fine Arts took over the excavation of Giza. For 23 years, they methodically cleared and documented the area. On March 9, 1925, while the leader of the expedition, George Reisner, was back in the United States, the staff photographer noticed a patch of plaster where he was expecting limestone. Under the direction of Ahmed Said, Reisner's head rais, they cleared the area and removed the plaster, revealing a deep shaft. They dug down 85 feet before reaching a masonry wall which, when penetrated, revealed a jumble of grave goods including a white alabaster sarcophagus, gold encased rods used to frame a canopy or tent, gold, wood furniture, and more. Using binoculars and mirrors, Battiscombe Gunn reported that he saw an inscription identifying Sneferu. But this, contrary to newspaper reports at the time, only meant that the owner of the tomb had lived during the reign of Sneferu.

Reisner concluded that this represented a secret reburial, possibly because robbers had gotten into the original tomb. By April, he had identified the owner of the tomb as Hetepheres, wife of Sneferu and mother of Khufu. In 1927, the team gathered to open the sarcophagus only to find that it was empty.

Reisner conjectured that originally, Hetepheres had been buried near her husband's pyramid in Dahshur and that her tomb was broken into shortly after her burial. He thought the robbers had opened the sarcophagus, stolen her mummy with all of her gold trappings, but had fled before taking the rest of her treasures. Reisner speculated that in order to avoid the wrath of the king, the officials responsible for her tomb, told Khufu that her mummy was still safely inside the sarcophagus. Khufu then ordered the sarcophagus and all of his mother's funerary artifacts reburied at Giza, near his own pyramid.

The exact sequence of her burial events remains a mystery, however. Dr. Mark Lehner has suggested that G 7000X was the original tomb for Hetepheres and that her second tomb was the Pyramid G1-a. He conjectured that the mummy of the queen was removed from G 7000X when the pyramid was completed and that some of the grave goods were left behind when the queen was reburied.

A third possibility, outlined by I. E. S. Edwards in his review of Lehner's theory, is that G 7000X was meant to be final resting place of Hetepheres and that the mummy was robbed from that structure shortly after her burial. It may be possible that a superstructure in the form of a pyramid was planned for shaft G 7000X.

Dr. Zahi Hawass has suggested that Hetepheres was originally buried at G1-a, the northernmost of the small pyramids, and that after a robbery a new shaft was excavated for a new tomb. This would explain the evidence of tampering on the tomb objects.

=== Grave treasures ===
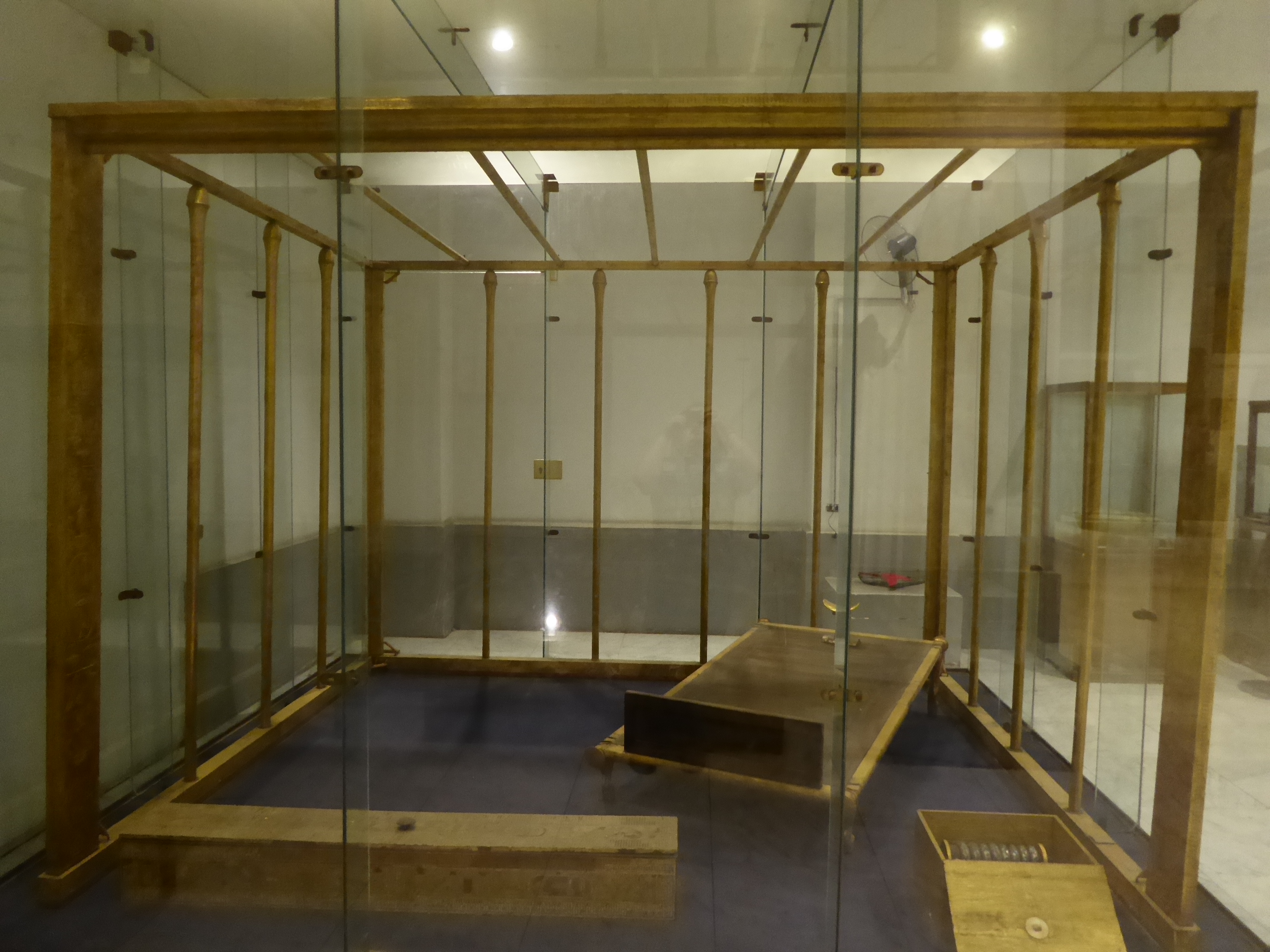
The reconstructed bedchamber of Queen Hetepheres in the Egyptian Museum from the original materials found in her Giza tomb).

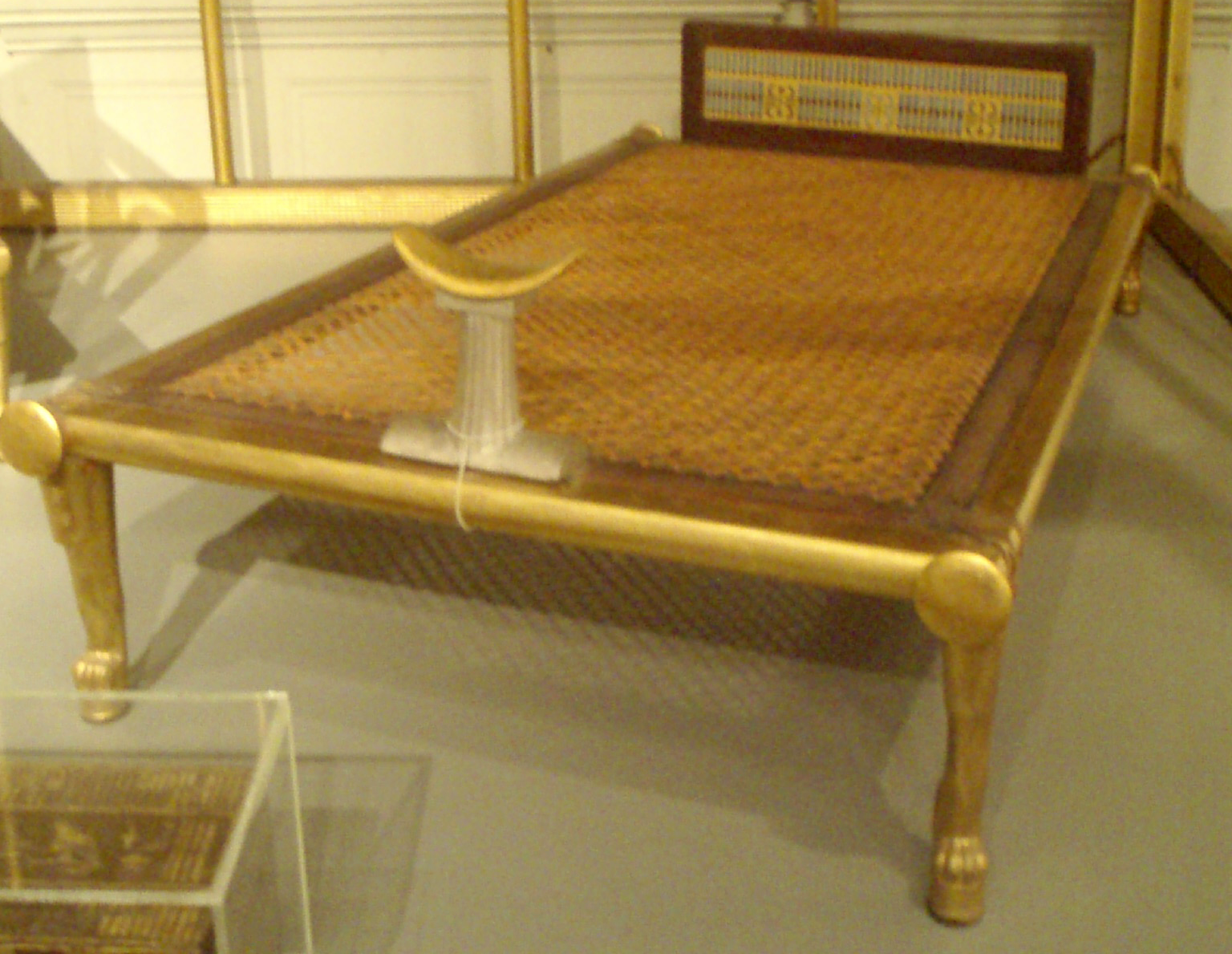
Copy of the royal bed with headrest from the funerary furniture of Hetepheres, bed length is 177 centimeters - the Museum of Fine Arts, Boston, reconstructed original is displayed in Cairo

The sarcophagus and funerary furniture of Hetepheres were discovered in 1925 near the satellite pyramids of the Great Pyramid of Giza in shaft G 7000X of a pit tomb. Although the sarcophagus was sealed and the Canopic chest was intact, the mummy of Hetepheres was missing. The chest, a large square box with four smaller square compartments inside, is one of the oldest examples known, so it has been suggested that Hetepheres may have been one of the first Egyptian royals to have her organs preserved. Of the four interior squares all contained organic matter, but two of the squares also contained liquid. Ensuing test revealed the liquid to be a three percent solution of Egyptian natron in water, which was used in the mummification process.

The contents of the tomb provide us with many details of the luxury and ways of life of the royal members of the Fourth Dynasty of Egypt. The items found in the tomb are on display at the Egyptian Museum in Cairo, with replicas of the main funerary furnishings in the Museum of Fine Arts in Boston, Massachusetts.

The funeral furniture of Hetepheres from G 7000X included the following:

- Bed canopy — (inscribed), gold covered, presented by Snefru, Cairo Museum Ent. 57711 (restored)
- Bed with inlaid footboard— gold covered, Cairo Museum Ent. 53261 (restored)
- Curtain box (inscribed) — gold covered, faience inlaid, presented by Snefru, with king seated on north end, and names and a winged disk on south end, Cairo Museum Ent. 72030 (restored)
- Armchair with papyrus — flower decoration, gold covered, Cairo Museum Ent. 53263 (restored)
- Armchair — with inlays of Neith-standards on both faces of back, with hawk standing on palm column on arms (wood perished), gold covered, Cairo Museum (recreated 2016)
- Gold fragments — with deceased seated smelling lotus, probably from lid of small box, Cairo Museum
- Palanquins (inscribed on back) — gold covered, Cairo Museum Ent. 52372 (restored)
- Remains of tubular leather case — containing two long staves covered with gold ribbed casing and a wooden stick with inlaid Min-emblem decoration, Cairo Museum (89619 a and b)
- Chest — gold covered with inlaid lid with text and Min-emblem decoration, containing a box in a stand with eight inscribed alabaster ointment jars, a copper toilet-spoon, a gold-covered and inscribed box containing silver bracelets with a butterfly design, and a head-rest of wood that is covered with gold and silver but is not inscribed, Cairo Museum
- Sarcophagus — alabaster
- Canopic box — alabaster
- A Necklace with a Pendant as well as a set of bracelets were also found in her burial, Cairo Museum

=== Restoration of the Funerary Furniture ===
Much of the restoration of the fragmentary remains of tomb G7000X's funerary furniture, including the bed, canopy and armchair with lotus flower decoration, was carried out by William Arnold Stewart. Stewart's descriptions of his work, which involved replacing the greater part of the wood which was "shrivelled or even disintegrated ... reduced to a sort of grey ash by fungus", are held in manuscript form by the Griffith Institute. In 1929 a detailed description of the results of the restoration appeared in the Bulletin of the Museum of Fine Arts in Boston where Reisner stated how he had been "so fortunate as to secure the services of a man ideally fitted for the work".

More recently a reconstruction of the armchair with Neith-standards was completed, using 3D digital reconstruction techniques.

== See also ==
- Egyptian Fourth Dynasty Family Tree
