= Nefermaat =

Ancient Egyptian prince

Nefermaat I
- Vizier of Egypt
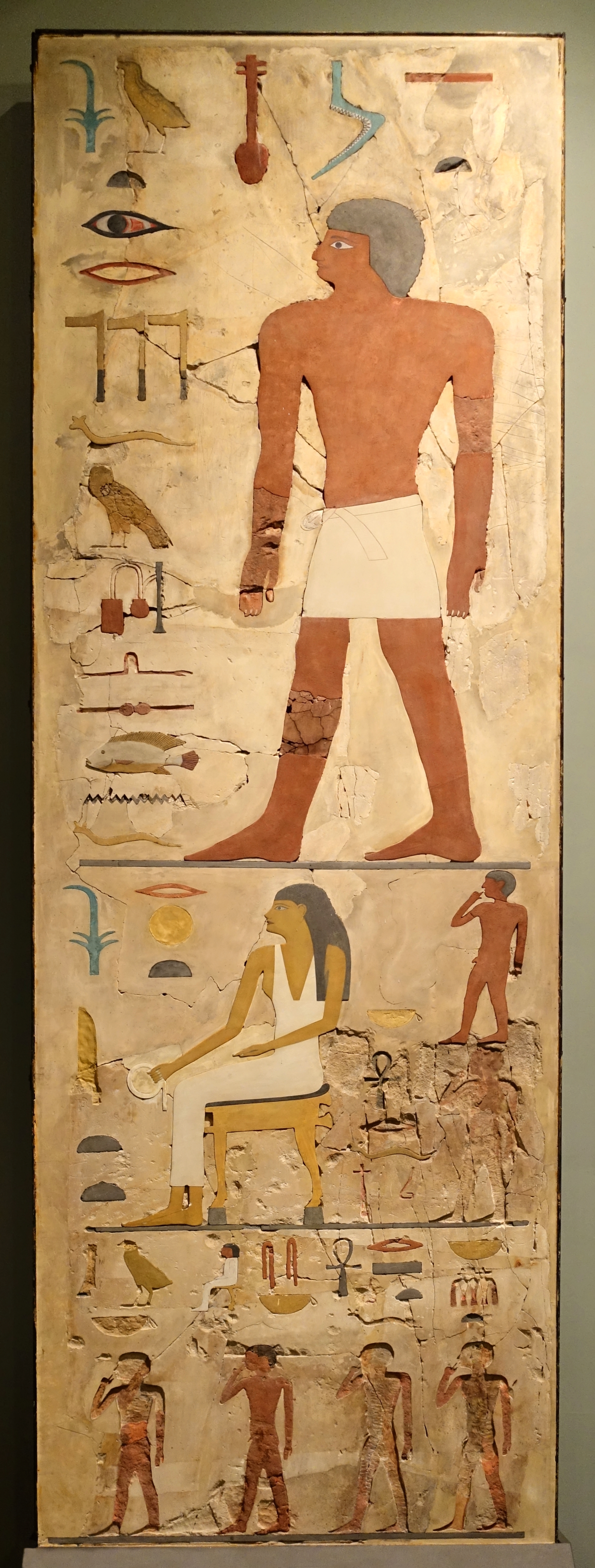
- A stele from the University of Chicago. The top layer depicts Nefermaat. The middle depicts his wife Itet seated, behind her an unknown child (top) and Ankherfenedjef (bottom). The bottom layer depicts four more of their children, from left to right, Wehemka, an unknown child, Ankhersheretef, and Nebkhenet.
- Tenure: c. 2570 BC
- Pharaoh: Khufu
- Burial: mastaba 16, Meidum
- Spouse: Itet
- Father: Sneferu
- Children: Hemiunu and several others

Nefermaat I (fl. c. 2570 BC) was an ancient Egyptian prince, a son of king Sneferu. He was a vizier possessing the titles of the king's eldest son, royal seal bearer, and prophet of Bastet. His name means "Maat is beautiful" or "With perfect justice".

== Biography ==
Nefermaat was the eldest son of Sneferu, the king and founder of the Fourth Dynasty of Egypt and his first wife. He was a half-brother of Khufu. Nefermaat's wife was Itet, also spelled as Atet. Fifteen of Nefermaat's offspring are named in his tomb, sons Hemiunu, Isu, Teta, Khentimeresh and daughters Djefatsen and Isesu are depicted as adults, while sons Itisen, Inkaef, Serfka, Wehemka, Shepseska, Kakhent, Ankhersheretef, Ankherfenedjef, Buneb, Shepsesneb and Nebkhenet and daughter Pageti are shown as children. His son Hemiunu is probably identical with vizier Hemiunu, who was believed to have helped plan the Great Pyramids.

One of Nefermaat's sisters, Nefertkau had a son also called Nefermaat.

== Tomb ==
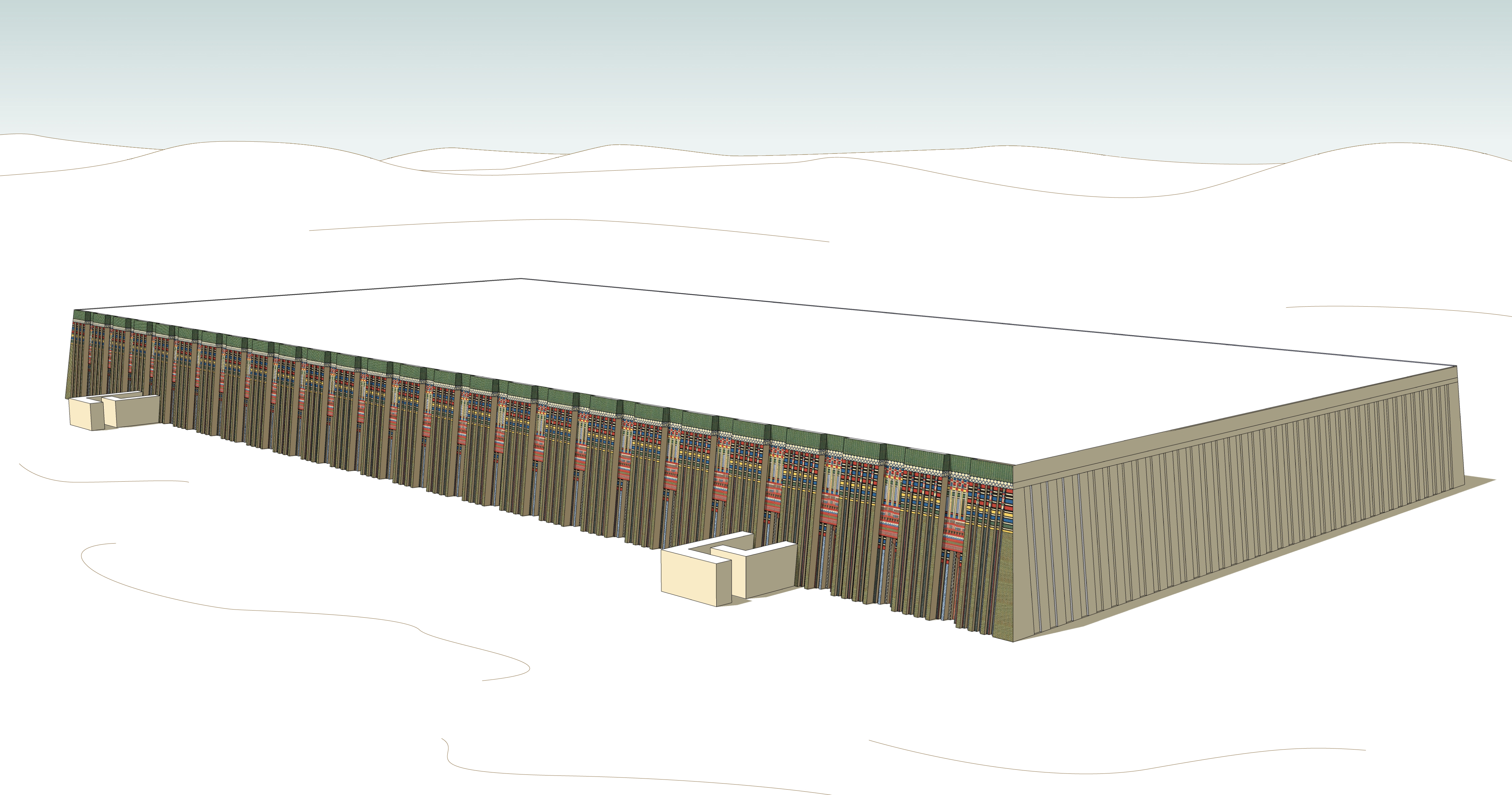
Tomb of Nefermaat in Meidum

Nefermaat was buried in mastaba 16 at Meidum. He was one of several relatives of King Sneferu, who was buried in Meidum. The tomb is known for the special technique used for drawing the scenes. Sculptors carved deeply incised images that then were filled with colored paste. This method was labor-intensive because the paste tended to dry, crack, and then fall out. The technique results in vividly colored scenes. This tomb is the only one known to date showing this technique. The fact that later, the plaster cracked and resulted in the loss of the paste, likely led to craftsmen abandoning this type of decoration.

=== Meidum Geese ===
Nefermaat's tomb is famous for the scene referred to as the "Meidum Geese" (now in the Egyptian Museum, JE 34571/ CG 1742). Discovered in 1871 by Auguste Mariette and Luigi Vassalli, the scene was executed in painted plaster. The painting was removed from the wall in order to be reassembled inside the Bulaq Museum. The full scene depicts six geese (greylag, greater white-fronted and red-breasted geese, none of which call modern Egypt home); three pointing to the left and three pointing to the right. Each group of three geese consists of one goose shown with head bowed down, eating, and two geese with heads held up. Each group of three animals represents many geese, as three represents the plural in Egyptian imagery. There are differences in the plumage of the birds that breaks the overall symmetry of the scene. This example of Egyptian painting is considered a masterpiece. A 2015 research paper by Francesco Tiradritti at the Kore University of Enna, published on LiveScience, suggested that the painting could be a nineteenth-century forgery, possibly made by Vassalli. Tiradritti's claims were promptly dismissed by Zahi Hawass and other Egyptian authorities.

Illustration of adult (left) and immature (right) red-breasted goose, showing plumage differences closely matching the Meidum paintings

A 2021 research paper used a biodiversity indicator called the 'Tobias Criteria' to assess the 'Meidum Geese" to see if these geese match with the species they have been identified as depicting. While Greylag and Greater white-fronted geese were consistent with their respective images, Red-breasted geese was a mismatch according to the analysis. Reasons to account for these differences could be due to either: artistic/cultural license; the depiction being a blend of different animals; or is an accurate depiction of an animal that no longer exists. Of these reasons, the study considered other realistic animal art from the Chapel of Itet(waterfowl, dogs, jackal, leopard, antelope) that are also identifiable to species-level, and suggested it possible the geese painted with red-coloured breast regions may be an unknown extinct goose species. A 2022 study found them to be within the plumage variation range and artistic licence for red-breasted geese.

The Meidum Geese
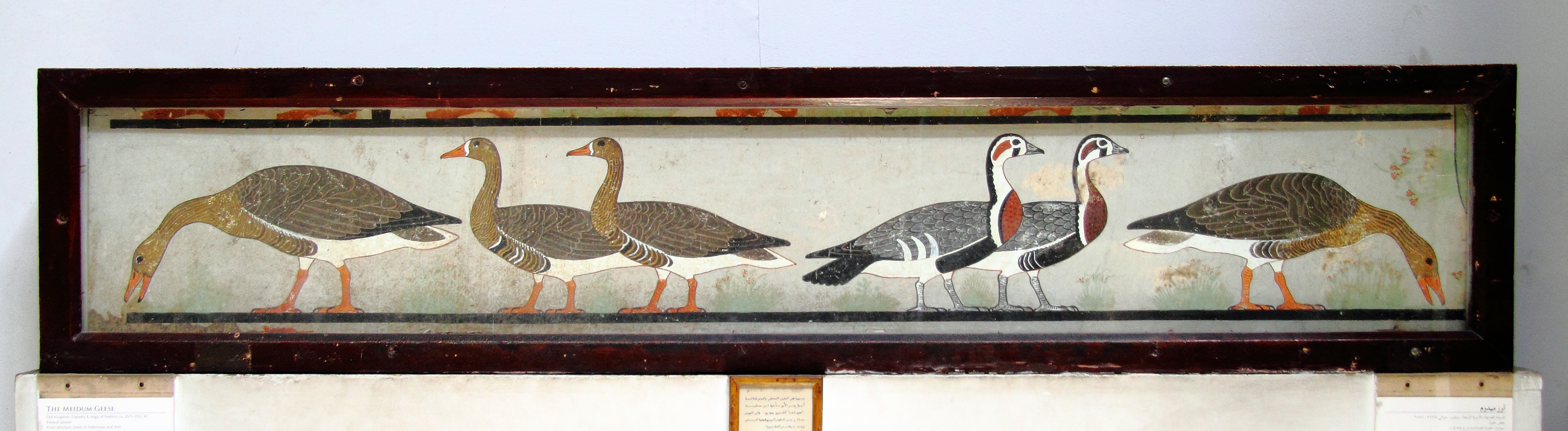
The full scene

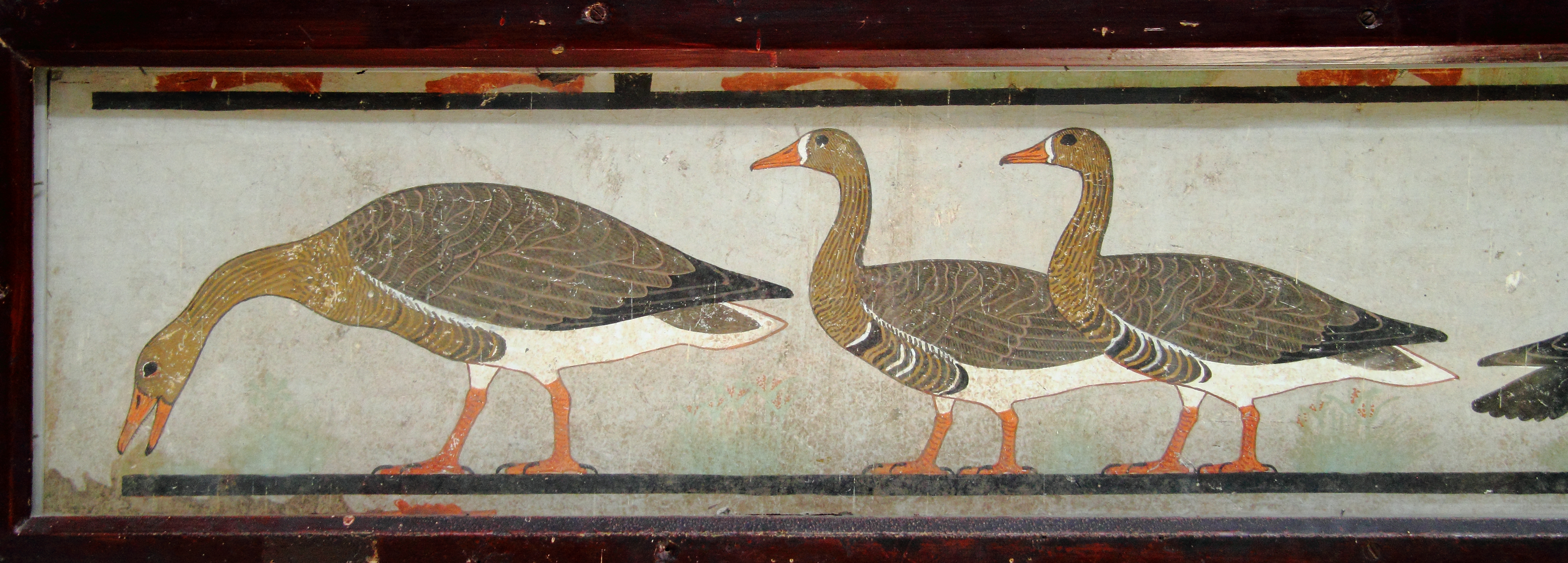
Left section with a greylag and two white-fronted geese

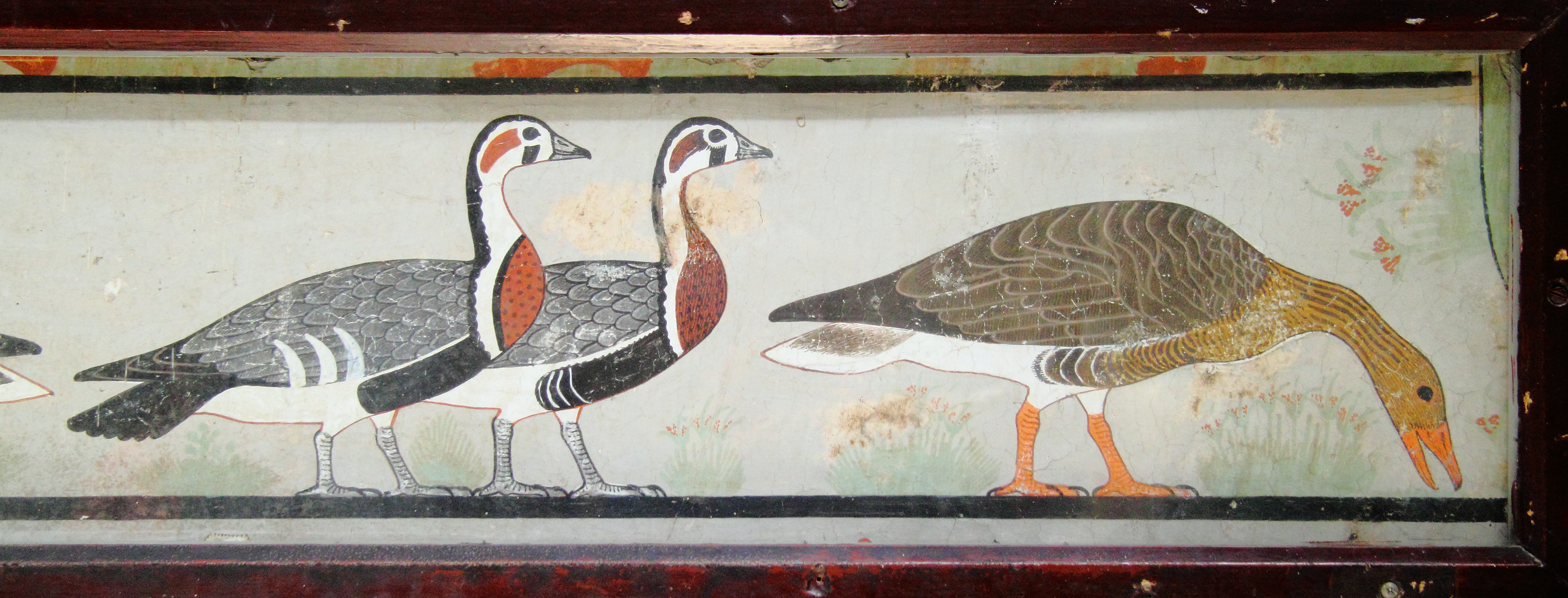
Right section with a greylag and two red-breasted geese

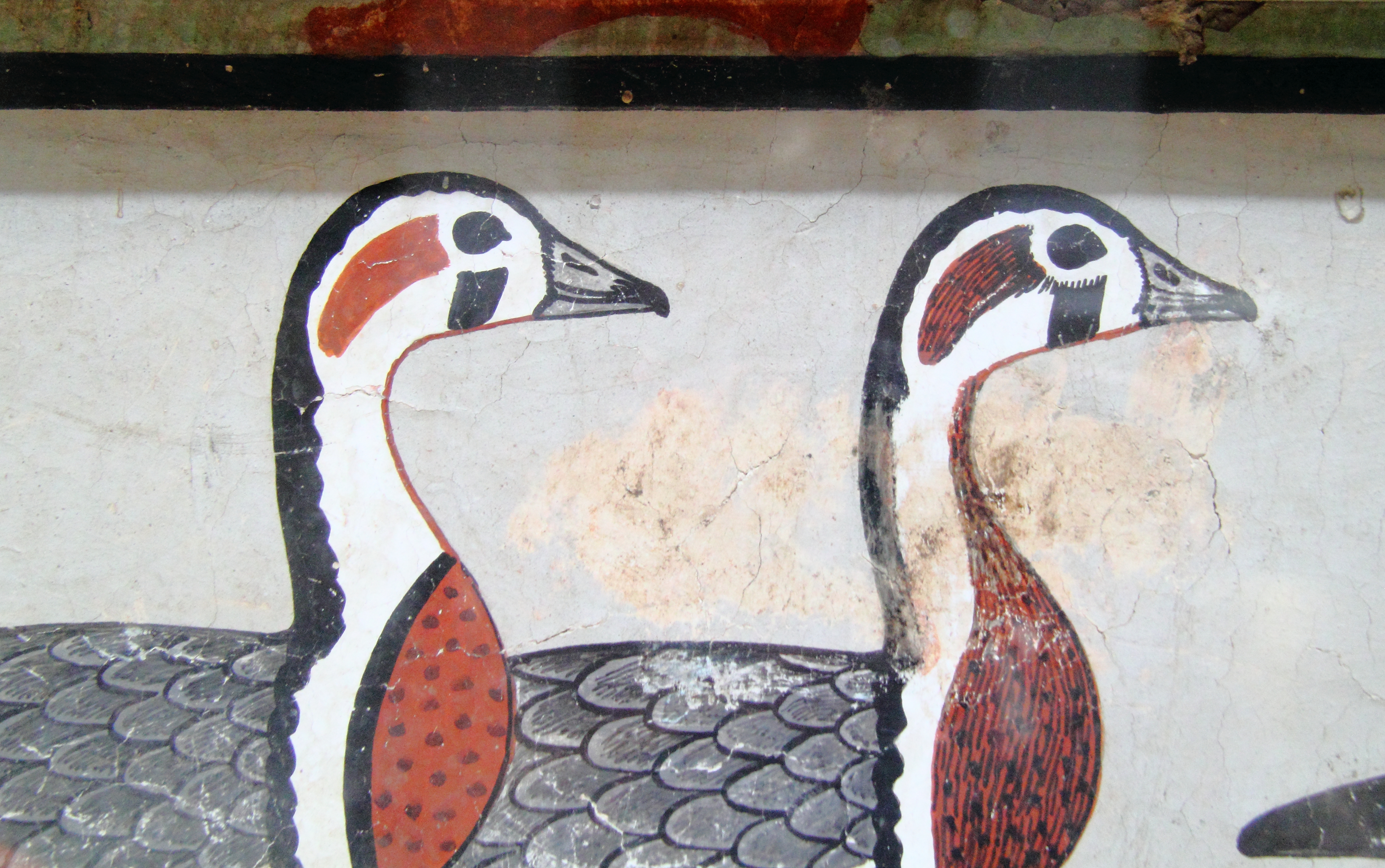
Detail of red-breasted geese
