= Nefermaat II =

- Vizier of Egypt
Egyptian name
nfr U4 t
- Tenure: c. 2550 BC
- Pharaoh: Khafre
- Burial: mastaba G 7060, Giza
- Father: An unknown man, maybe Khufu
- Mother: Nefertkau I
- Children: Sneferukhaf

Nefermaat II (fl. c. 2550 BC) was a member of the Egyptian royal family during the 4th Dynasty and vizier of Khafre (his cousin).

Nefermaat was a son of a King's Daughter Nefertkau I and a grandson of Sneferu.

Nefermaat was buried in mastaba G 7060 at Giza. His tomb is part of a group of tombs including those of Nefertkau I (G 7050) and his son Sneferukhaf (G 7070). Nefermaat's tomb is located near the Pyramid of Khufu, who may not only have been his uncle, but also his father (according to George Andrew Reisner). This last point is rejected by Strudwick and Baud. He was nevertheless considered close enough family to be elevated to the vizierate, a title reserved to close family member during the 4th Dynasty.

== Titles ==
The full list of titles of Kawab were:

Title	Translation	Jones Index
imy iz	he who is in the iz-bureau, councillor	247
iry-pˁt	hereditary prince/nobleman, 'keeper of the patricians'	1157
wr di.w pr ḏḥwty	Greatest of the Five in the temple of Thoth	1471
mniw nḫn	protector/guardian of Nekhen/Hierakonpolis	1597
ḥȝty-ˁ	count	1858
ḥrỉ-tp nḫb	Overlord of Nekheb (El-Kab)	2374
ḫrp iȝwt nbwt nṯrwt	director of every divine office	2541
ḫrp ˁḥ	director of the ˁḥ palace	2579
ḫtm(ty)-bity	sealer of the King of Lower Egypt	2775
zȝ nswt	king's son	2911
zȝ nswt n ẖt.f	King's son of his body	2912
smr wˁty	sole companion	3268
tȝyty zȝb ṯȝty	he of the curtain, chief justice and vizier	3706

Translations and indexes from Dilwyn Jones.

== See also ==
- Nefermaat I
