= Itet =

Ancient Egyptian royal

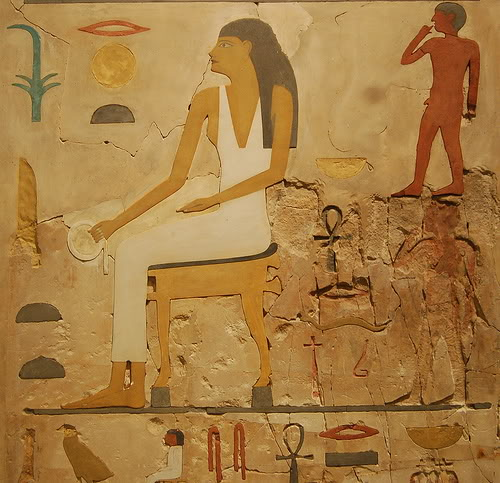
- Itet and two of her sons (an unknown son and Ankherfenedjef) in a scene from her tomb at Meidum (Oriental Institute, Chicago)
- Burial place: Beni Suef, Egypt
- Years active: c. 2570 BC
- Spouse: Nefermaat
- Children: Djefatsen, Isesu, Hemiunu, Isu, Teta, Khentimeresh, Pageti, Itisen, Inkaef, Serfka, Wehemka, Shepseska, Kakhent, Ankhersheretef, Ankherfenedjef, Buneb, Shepsesneb, Nebkhenet

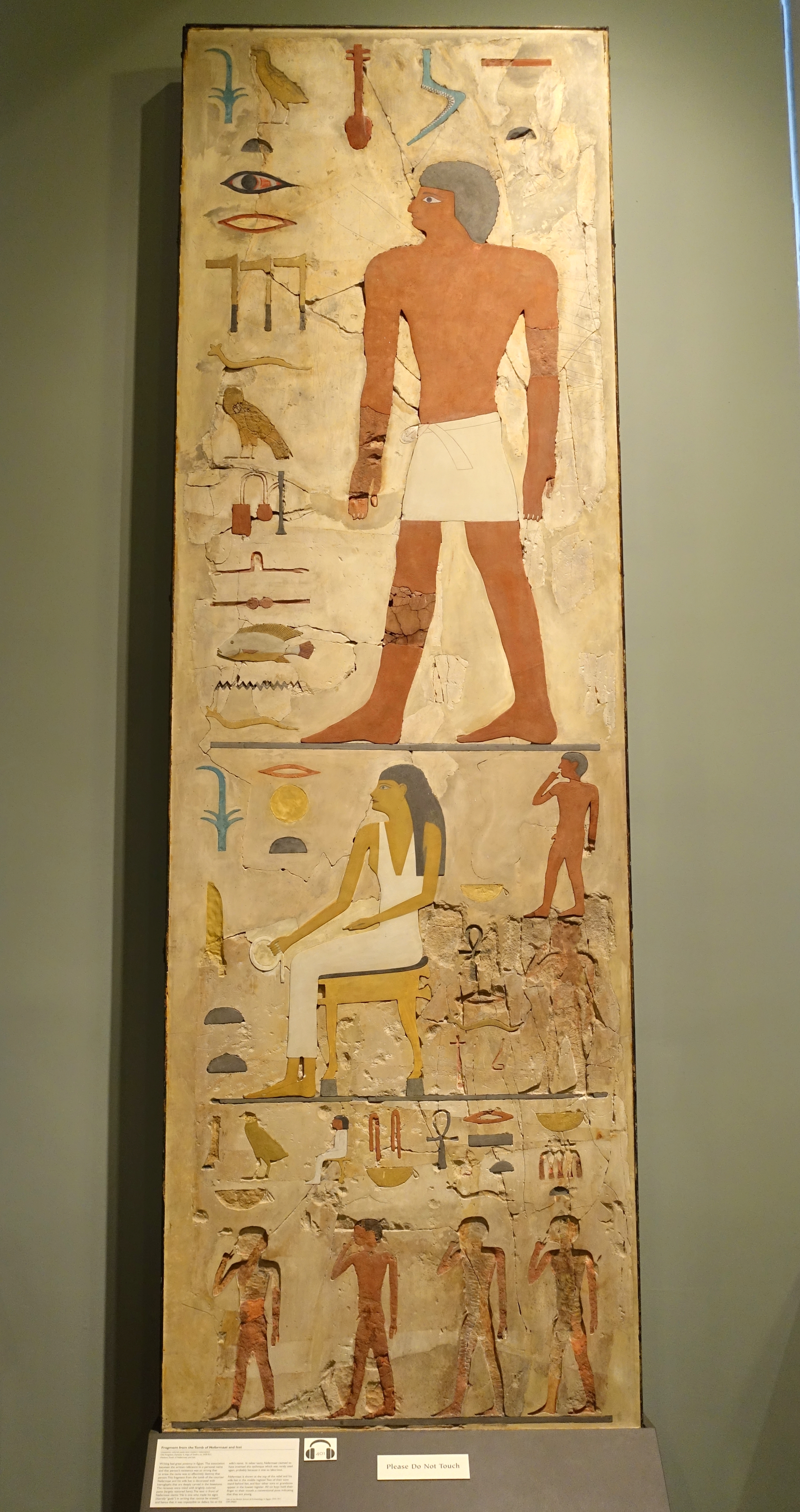
A stele from the University of Chicago. The top layer depicts Itet's husband Nefermaat. The middle depicts Itet seated, behind her an unknown son (top) and Ankherfenedjef (bottom). The bottom layer depicts four more of their sons, from left to right, Wehemka, an unknown child, Ankhersheretef, and Nebkhenet.

Itet (fl. c. 2570 BC) also known as Atet, was a royal woman who lived in ancient Egypt. She was the wife of Nefermaat, who was the eldest son of king Sneferu as well as a vizier and a religious leader in the royal court who officiated in the worship of Bastet. She was the mother of three daughters and many sons. Her son, Hemiunu, succeeded her husband as vizier. She and her husband are buried in mastaba 16 at Meidum. Their tomb is famous for paintings of geese, and of other animals, as well as depictions of daily family life.

== Family ==
15 of Itet and Nefermaat's offspring are named in their tomb in Meidum. Daughters Djefatsen and Isesu and sons Hemiunu, Isu, Teta, and Khentimeresh are depicted as adults, while daughter Pageti and sons Itisen, Inkaef, Serfka, Wehemka, Shepseska, Kakhent, Ankhersheretef, Ankherfenedjef, Buneb, Shepsesneb, and Nebkhenet are depicted as children. Her son, Hemiunu, is the vizier who is believed to have helped plan the Great Pyramids for Khufu and he often is referred to as its architect.
