= Luigi Vassalli =

Italian Egyptologist and revolutionary (1812-1887)

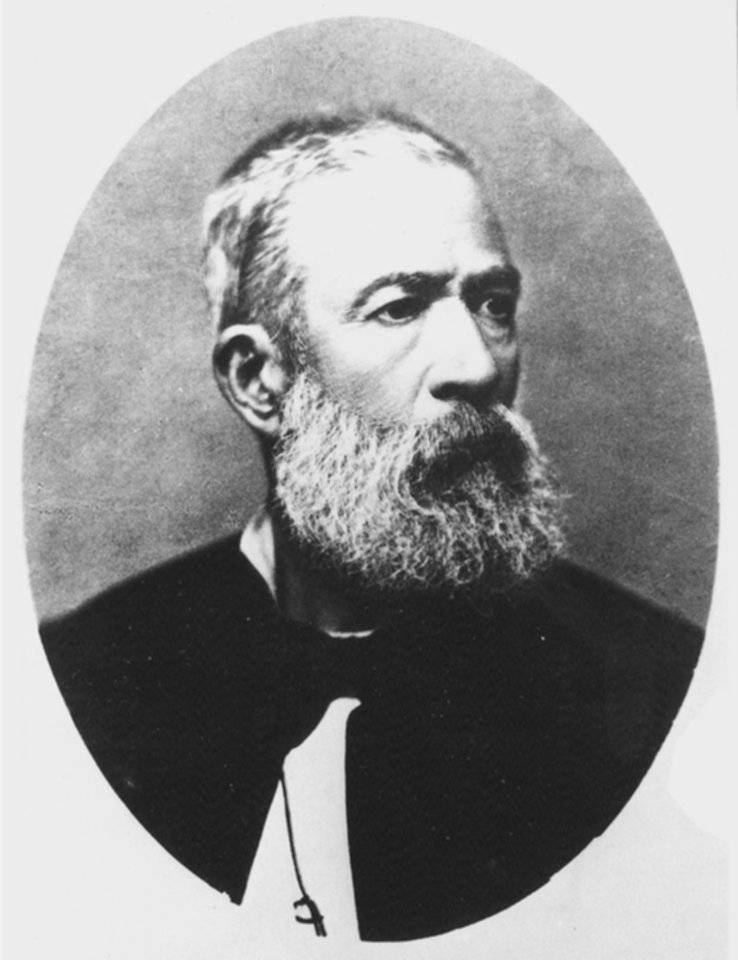
- Born: January 8, 1812; Milan, Kingdom of Italy
- Died: June 13, 1887 (aged 75); Rome, Kingdom of Italy
- Occupation: Egyptologist

Luigi Vassalli (also Luigi Vassalli-bey) (January 8, 1812 – June 13, 1887) was an Italian Egyptologist and revolutionary.

== Biography ==
Vassalli was born in 1812 in Milan. In 1828 he enrolled at the Brera Academy and around this period he joined the Mazzinian activism but after a failed conspiracy he was sentenced to death, only to be pardoned but exiled. He moved in several places across Europe and later he traveled to Egypt where he began working for the local government.

In 1848 Vassalli returned to his homeland to join the revolutionary movements against the Austrian Empire, but after the failure he returned to Egypt where he became a portrait painter and an archaeological guide for wealthy foreigners. Around 1858 he was appointed Inspector of excavations by the French Egyptologist Auguste Mariette, who was Director of Antiquities at this time. Vassalli assisted in excavations at Giza and Saqqara until 1860, when he gave resignation and returned again home to give his contribution to the Expedition of the Thousand led by Giuseppe Garibaldi. After the victory he was appointed First Class Conservator at the Naples National Archaeological Museum; however, the office was soon abolished by the still pro-Borbonic museum management and Vassalli again came back to Cairo.

In Egypt he made several archaeological explorations in many sites such as Tanis, Saqqara, Dendera and Edfu from 1861 to 1868. He sent many mummy remains to the Museo Civico di Storia Naturale of Milan and in 1871 he made around 150 casts from monuments exhibited in the Bulaq Museum which he brought to Florence with him. During his stay there the Italian government asked him to inspect many Egyptian collections in Italy, after which he returned to his duties in Cairo.

Also in 1871, along with Mariette he discovered the mastaba of Nefermaat at Meidum, which is well known for the famous scene commonly referred as the "Meidum geese". Vassalli carefully removed the whole scene from the tomb wall and reassembled it inside the Bulaq Museum. This fact sparked a controversy over a century later, when in a 2015 research the Egyptologist Francesco Tiradritti suggested that the Meidum geese scene is a 19th-century forgery possibly made by Vassalli himself, a claim dismissed by Egyptian authorities.

After Mariette's death in 1881, Vassalli became Director ad interim until the installation of Gaston Maspero. He retired in 1884 and returned to Milan and then to Rome; he died from suicide there on June 13, 1887. According to his will, all his papers were donated to the city of Milan.

== Significant works ==
- 1867. I monumenti istorici egizi: il museo e gli scavi d'antichità eseguiti per ordine di S.A. Il vicerè Ismail Pascia. Milano 1867.
