= Sneferukhaf =

Sneferu-khaf
< s nfr r f w > N28 f
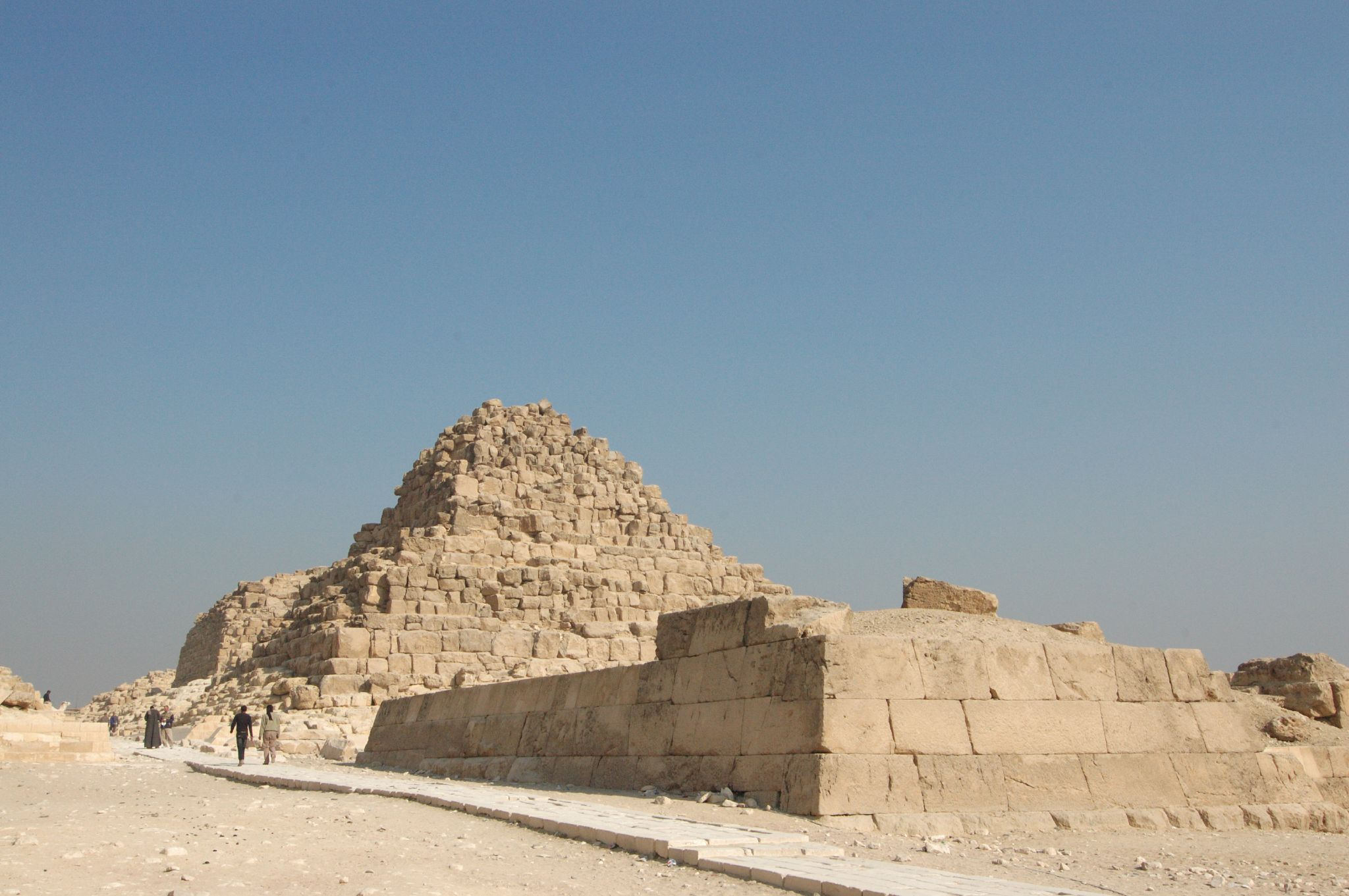
- Burial place: Giza, Giza Governorate, Egypt
- Years active: c. 2500 BC
- Title: Prince of Egypt
- Children: 2 sons
- Parent: Nefermaat II

Sneferukhaf (fl. c. 2500 BC) was an Egyptian prince who lived during the 4th Dynasty. He was a son of Prince Nefermaat II and unknown woman, and thus a grandson of Princess Nefertkau I. He was named after his great-grandfather, King Sneferu. He had two sons. He was buried in mastaba G 7070 at Giza.

== Titles ==
His full list of titles were:

Title	Translation	Index Jones
iry-pˁt	hereditary prince/nobleman, 'keeper of the patricians'	1157
mniw nḫn	protector/guardian of Nekhen/Hierakonpolis	1597
mdw ḥp	herdsman of Apis	1699
rȝ p nb	mouth of every Pe-ite/Butite (see Buto)	1831
ḫtm(ty)-bity	sealer of the King of Lower Egypt	2775
zȝ nswt	king's son	2911
smr wˁty	sole companion	3268

Translations and indexes from Dilwyn Jones.
