= Roemer- und Pelizaeus-Museum Hildesheim =

Museum in Hildesheim, Germany

Coordinates: 52°08′59″N 9°56′39″E

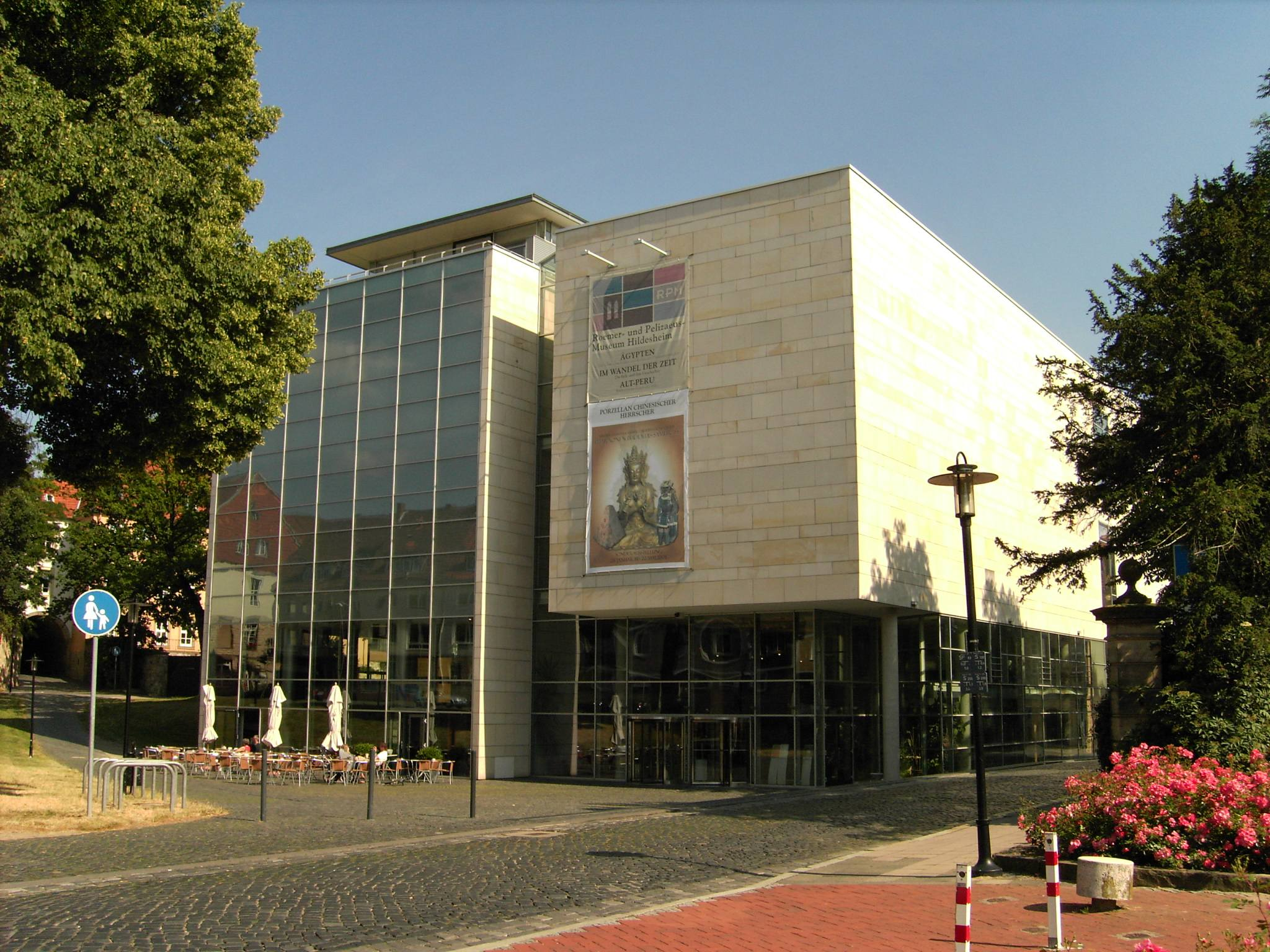
Roemer- und Pelizaeus-Museum

Roemer- und Pelizaeus-Museum Hildesheim

The Roemer- und Pelizaeus-Museum Hildesheim is an archaeological museum in Hildesheim, Germany. Mostly dedicated to ancient Egyptian and ancient Peruvian art, the museum also includes the second largest collection of Chinese porcelain in Europe. Furthermore, the museum owns collections of natural history, ethnology, applied arts, drawings and prints, local history and arts, as well as archeology. Apart from the permanent exhibitions, the museum hosts temporary exhibitions of other archaeological and contemporary topics.

In 2000, the old building, originally built in the 1950s, was replaced by a new building, significantly increasing the space available for exhibitions.

The current museum is the result of the union of the Roemer Museum, founded in 1844 (and named after one of the founders, Hermann Roemer), and the Pelizaeus Museum, established in 1911, that had housed the private collection of Egyptian antiques of Wilhelm Pelizaeus.

== Repatriation ==
In 2023 the museum was one of seven German museums and universities to return Māori and Moriori remains to the Museum of New Zealand Te Papa Tongarewa in New Zealand.

== Gallery ==
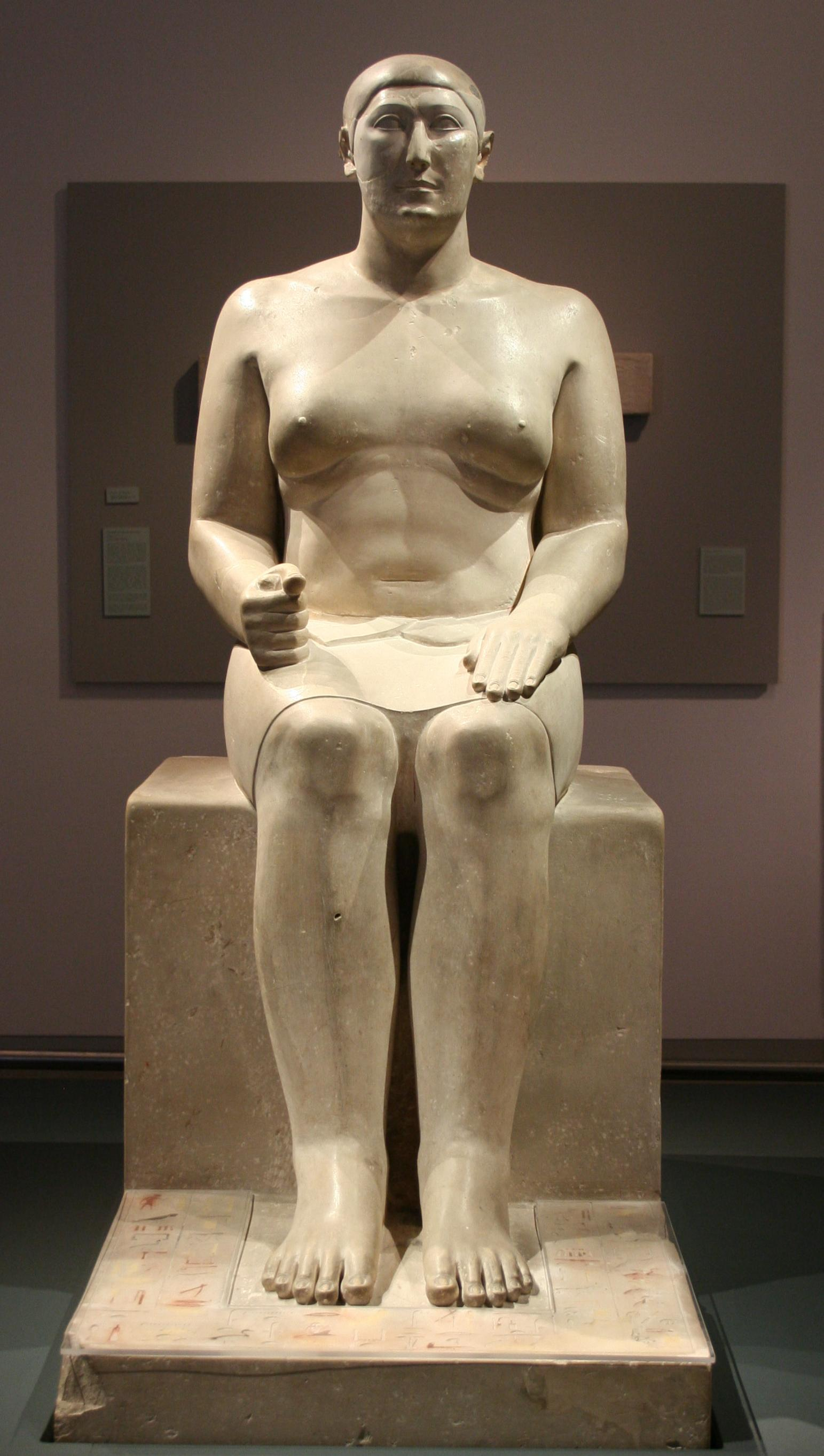
Statue of Hemiunu

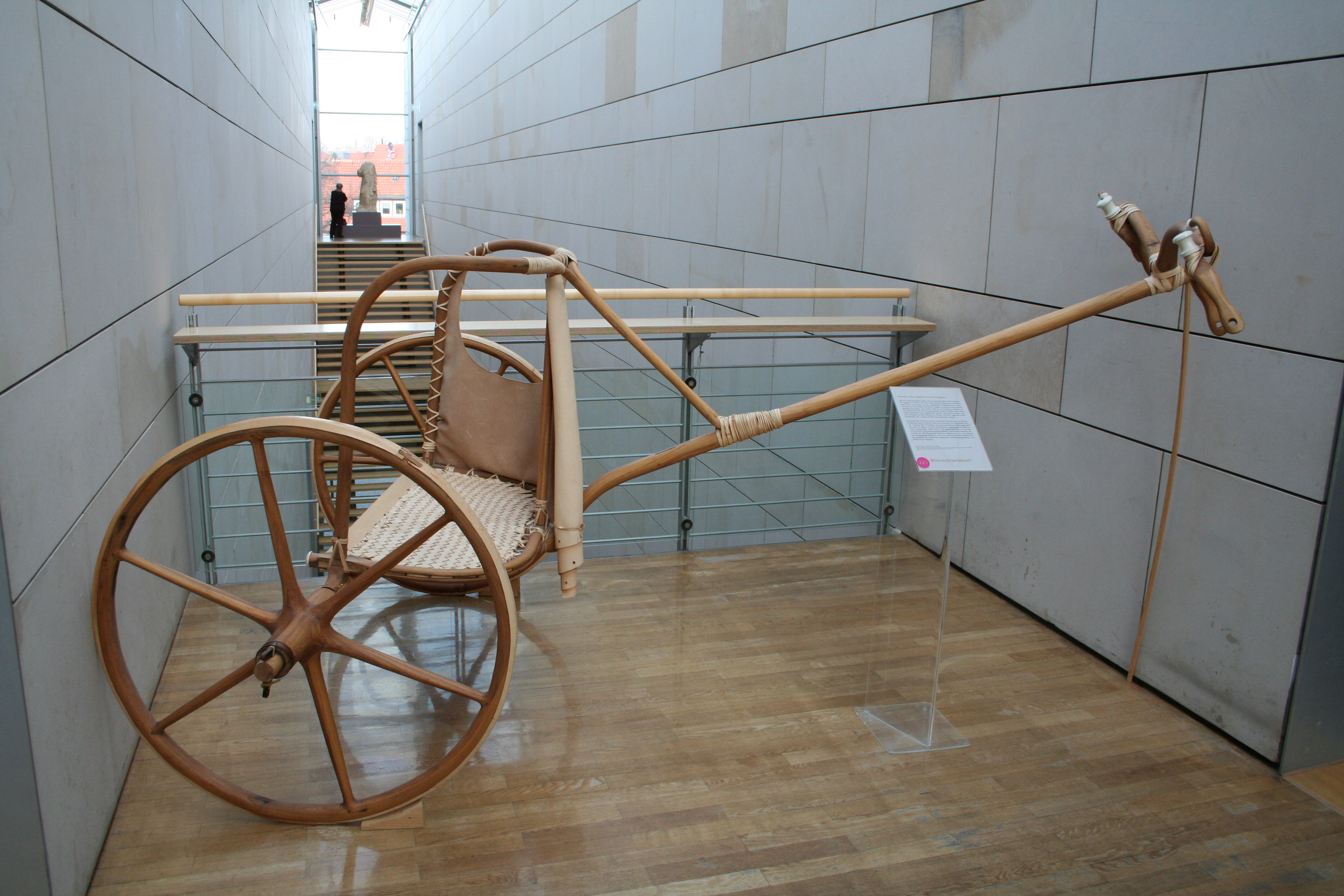
Replica of an ancient Egyptian chariot

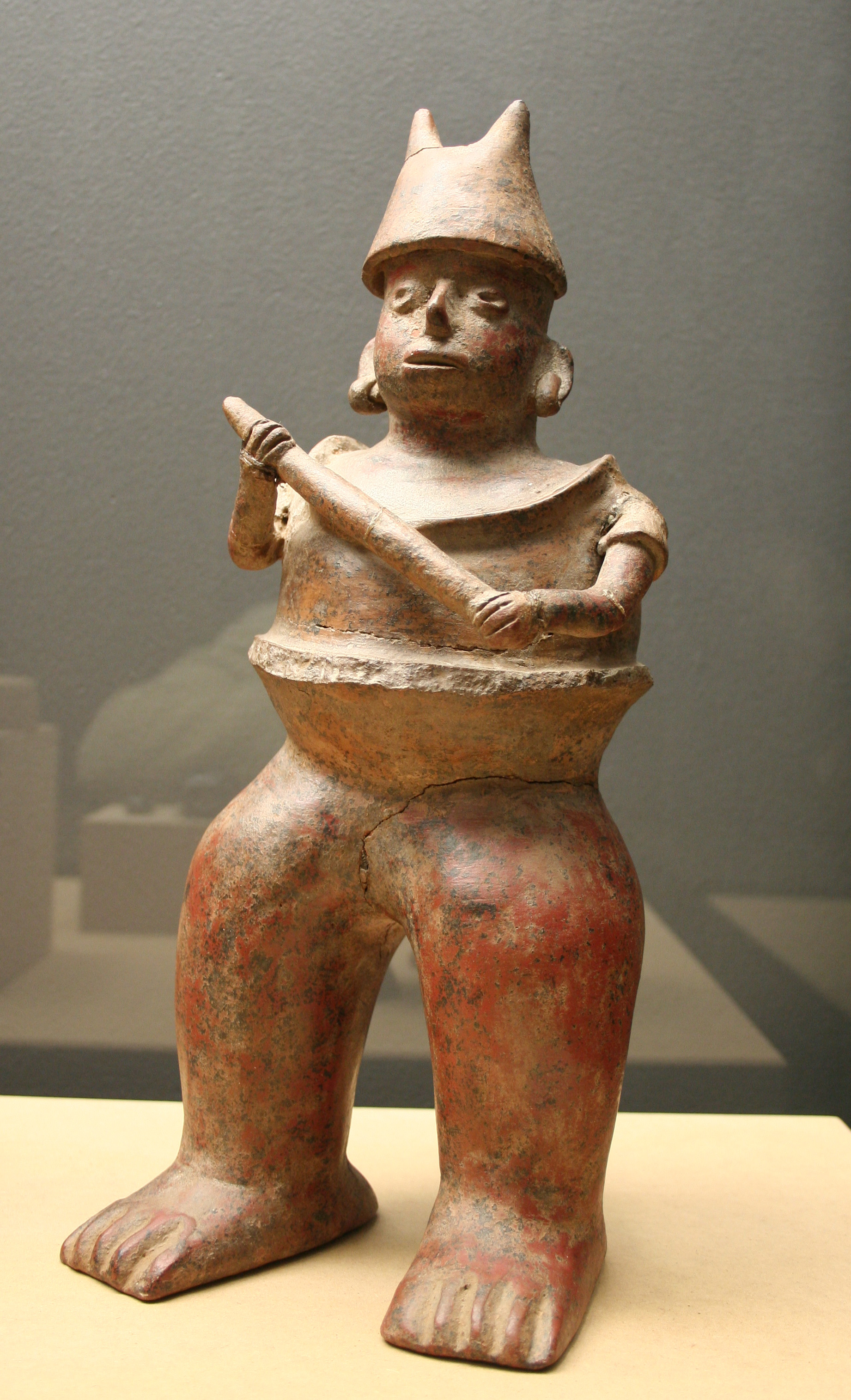

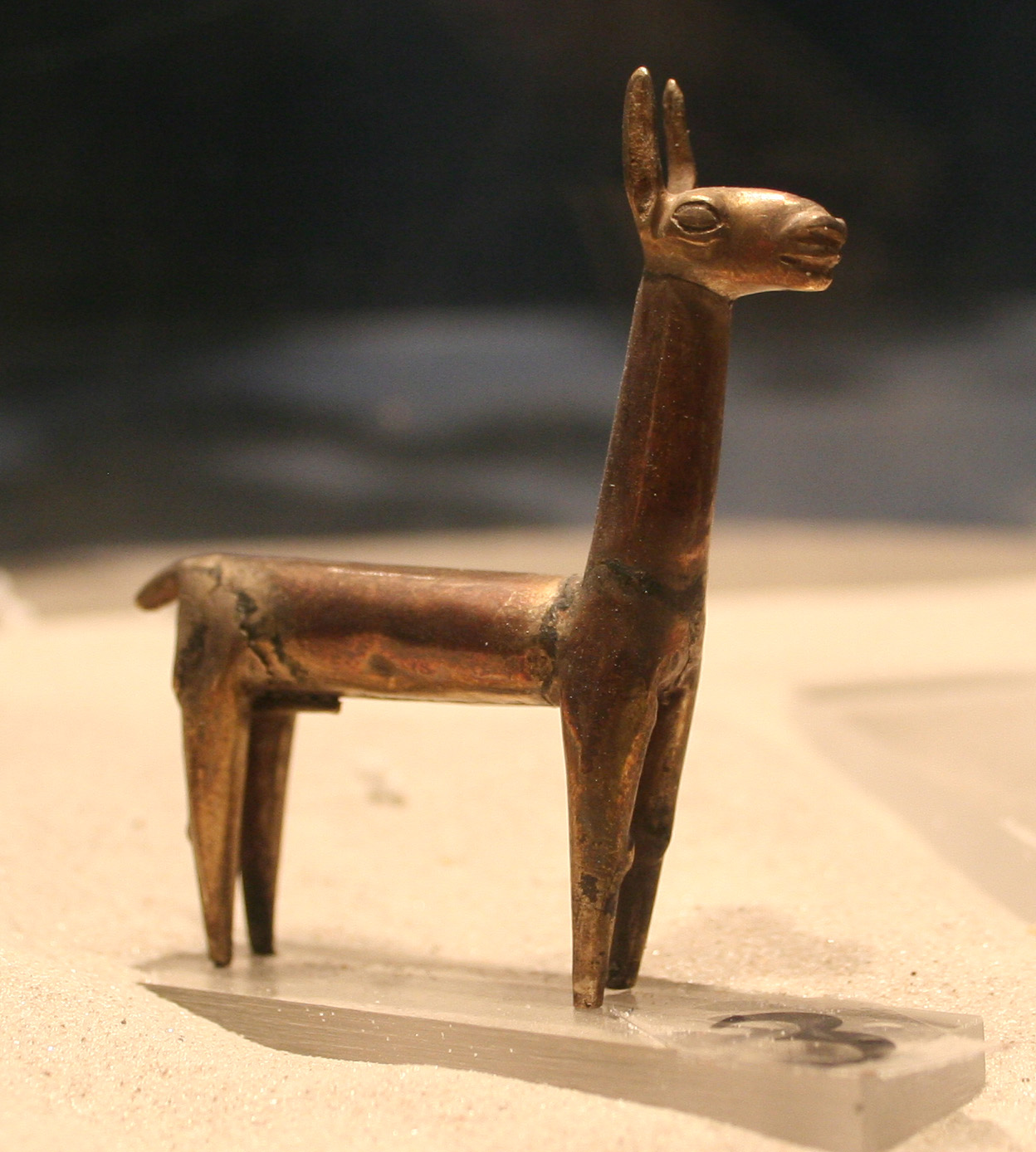
