= Hemiunu =

Ancient Egyptian prince and vizier

Coordinates: 29°58′46″N 31°07′48″E

- Hereditary Prince; King's son of his body Vizier of Egypt
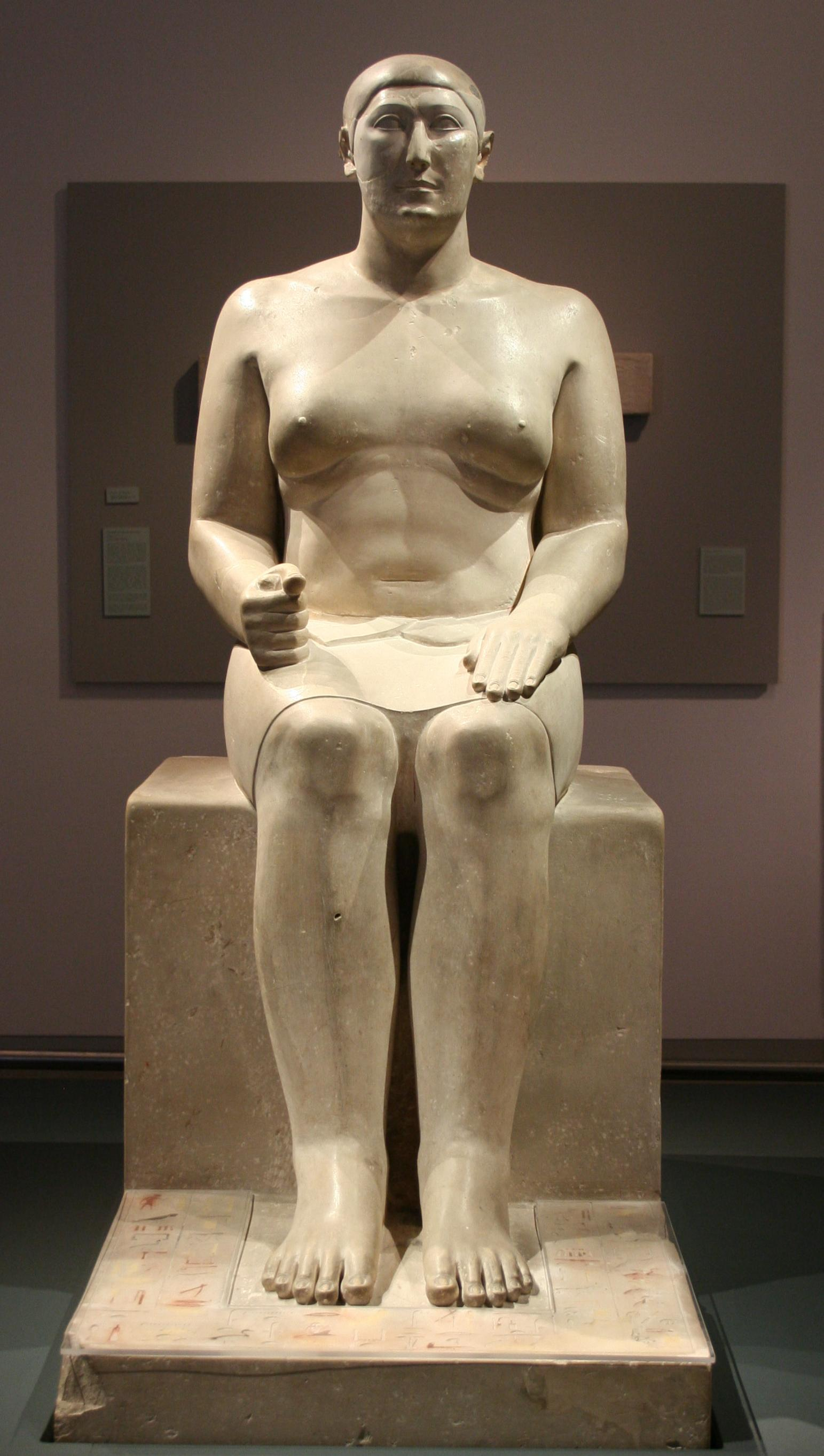
- Statue of Hemiunu at the Pelizaeus Museum, Hildesheim, Germany
Egyptian name
zA t sw n X t f Hm iwnBeloved royal son Hemiunu
- Dynasty: Fourth Dynasty of Egypt
Father
Nefermaat
Z1 zA n s bit t V18 nfr U5 a t D12
Vizier, keeper of the royal seal
Mother
Itet
sw r D12 i t t

Hemiunu, sometimes referred to as Hemon, (fl. 2570 BC) was an ancient Egyptian prince who is believed to have been the architect of the Great Pyramid of Giza. As vizier, succeeding his father, Nefermaat, and his uncle, Kanefer, and the pharaoh's chosen seal-bearer, Hemiunu occupied a position of power second only to the monarch himself, overseeing all royal works by Khufu's decree. His tomb lies in the Giza West Field, adjacent to the Great Pyramid itself.

== Biography ==
Hemiunu was a son of prince Nefermaat and his wife, Itet. He was a grandson of Sneferu and a nephew of Khufu, the Old Kingdom pharaoh. Hemiunu had three sisters and many brothers.

In his tomb, he is described as a hereditary prince, count, and sealer of the king of Lower Egypt (jrj-pat HAtj-a xtmw-bjtj). On a statue found in his serdab, Hemiunu is given the following titles: king's son of his body, chief justice, and vizier, greatest of the five of the House of Thoth (sA nswt n XT=f tAjtj sAb TAtj wr djw pr-DHwtj).

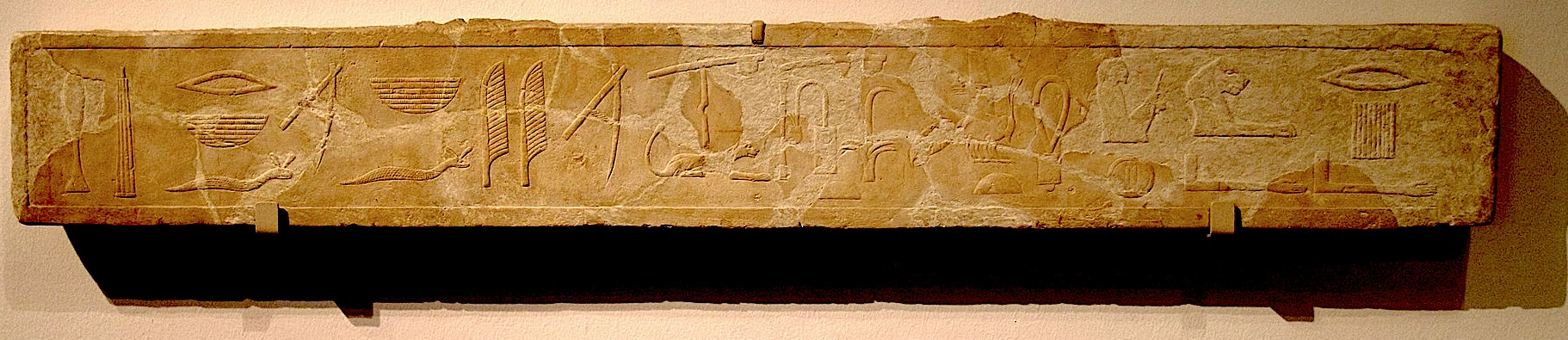
Door frame, mastaba G 4000, Hemiunu titles; Hereditary Prince, vizier, keeper of the royal seal, chief of the royal scribes, administrator of all royal buildings

== Tomb ==
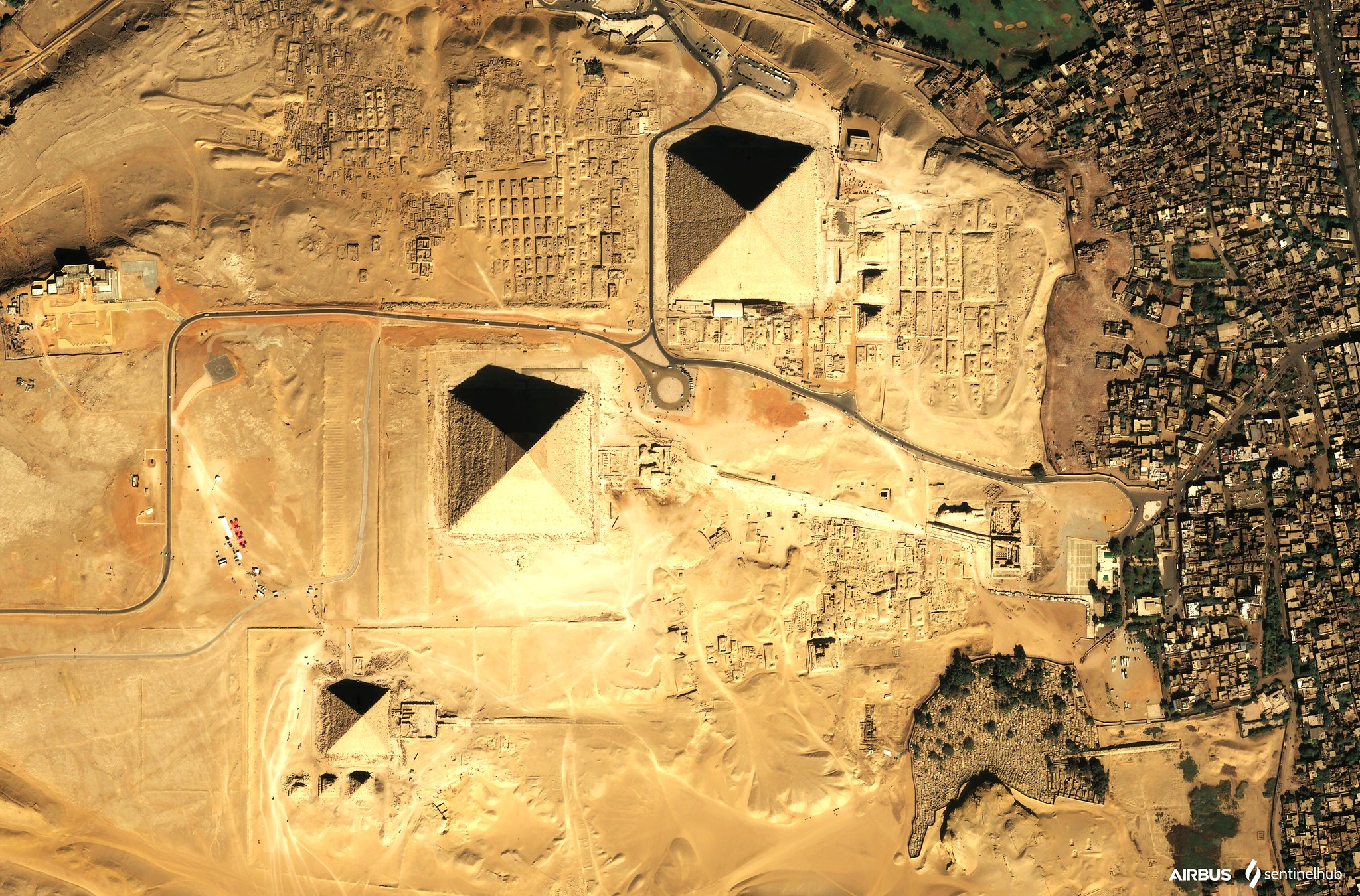
Giza plateau pyramids complex

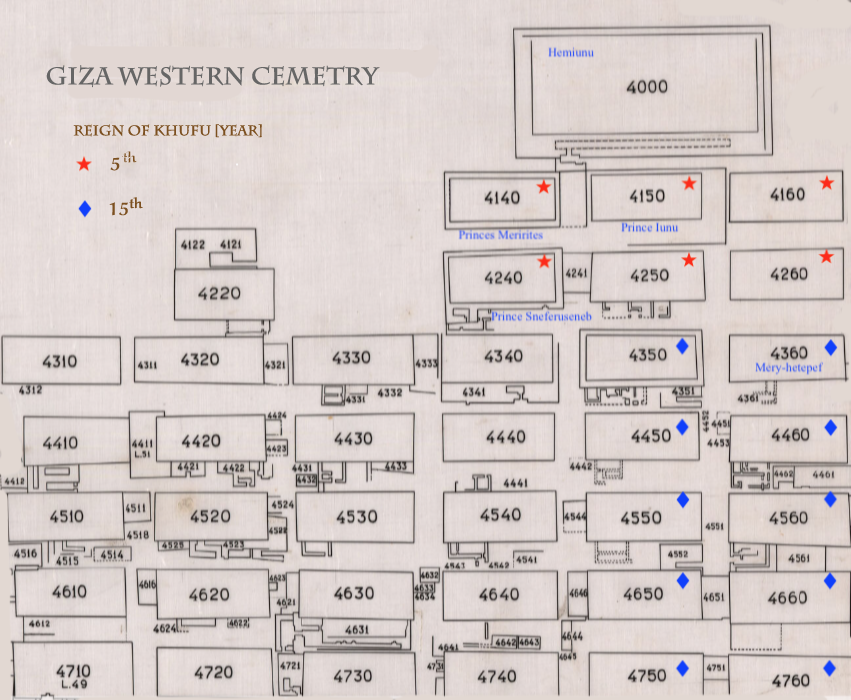
Mastabas built during (chronology) the reign of Khufu in rows behind G 4000

Hemiunu's tomb lies close to Khufu's pyramid and contains reliefs of his image. Some stones of his badly damaged mastaba are marked with dates referring to Khufu's reign. His statue can be found at the Pelizaeus Museum, Hildesheim, Germany. His statue was found in the walled-up serdab of Hemiunu's mastaba by archaeologist Hermann Junker in March 1912. Ancient looters had ransacked the mastaba in their quest for valuable items, and as a result the wall to the serdab had a child-sized hole cut into it. The looters had forcefully gouged out the statue's precious inlaid eyes and gold castings leading to the right arm of the statue being broken and the head severed. The head has since been restored, using a relief of Hemiunu as a guide for the nose's profile.

Besides the aforementioned damage, the seated statue is well-preserved for a statue of its scale and antiquity and is notable for its realism, a characteristic typically not present in ancient Egyptian art depicting royal figures. Hemiunu's features are only lightly stylised and clearly based on his appearance. He is depicted as obese, with notable accumulation of fat in the pectoral region. This contrasts with the more idealised representation of male subjects in royal portraiture in this and most succeeding periods of ancient Egyptian art.

Both the western and eastern cemeteries at the Great Pyramid of Giza of Khufu are characterised by ordered rows of type-like mastabas, especially visible behind the mastaba of Hemiuna G 4000. In designing the cemetery for Khufu and his court, the shape of the graves was not left to tradition alone, but was specifically determined by the architect, certainly with the consent, perhaps even with the help of the monarch.
Hemiun's tomb, noticeably larger than its counterparts, corresponds to his high status and his position of Khufu’s nephew and son of Nefermaat, Khufu’s older brother.

== Significance in context of Ancient Egyptian history ==
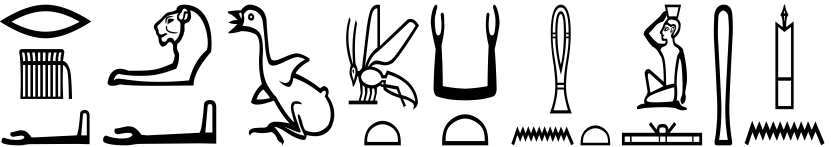
Monuments were not only symbols of royal authority throughout the country, they were also practical tools for demonstrating authority in the central management of the economy. The small stepped pyramid in their centre was also significant for the local population, which served as a constant reminder of their economic obligation to the state, the obligation to pay taxes, respect for the courts and projects of the monarch. From the state's perspective, monuments and their associated administrative buildings – with one facility in each province – facilitated and systematised revenue collection. At the end of the 3rd dynasty, the monarch and his administration achieved their ultimate goal of absolute power. The stage was set for the greatest royal project the world had ever seen. The development of monumental buildings became more significant in history from the end of the 2nd dynasty, when Khasekhemwy built his tomb in Abydos and a monument in Hierakonpolis, in the 3rd dynasty Djoser stacked step pyramid by the architect Imhotep, which saw new building elements and more extensive use of stone. Leaving aside the less significant buildings in Saqqara and Zawyet El Aryan, Sneferu’s building experiments in Dahshur and Meidum entered the history opening into the right Red Pyramid. This was basically the model for the project Khufu's Great Pyramids. At the same time, the logistical background system of the mentioned buildings was formed, including the development of specialised professions of work groups, but also the necessary management functions, where the pharaoh was in the top position and in the 4th dynasty mostly managing officials members of the branched royal family. The figure described here is the prince, vizier and nephew of Pharaoh Khufu Hemiunu, with the title "Vizier Inspector of All Royal Buildings" he is therefore an unforgettable and important historical figure.

== See also ==
List of Egyptian architects

- Media related to Hemiunu at Wikimedia Commons
