= Nefertkau I =

nfr r&t kA kA kA
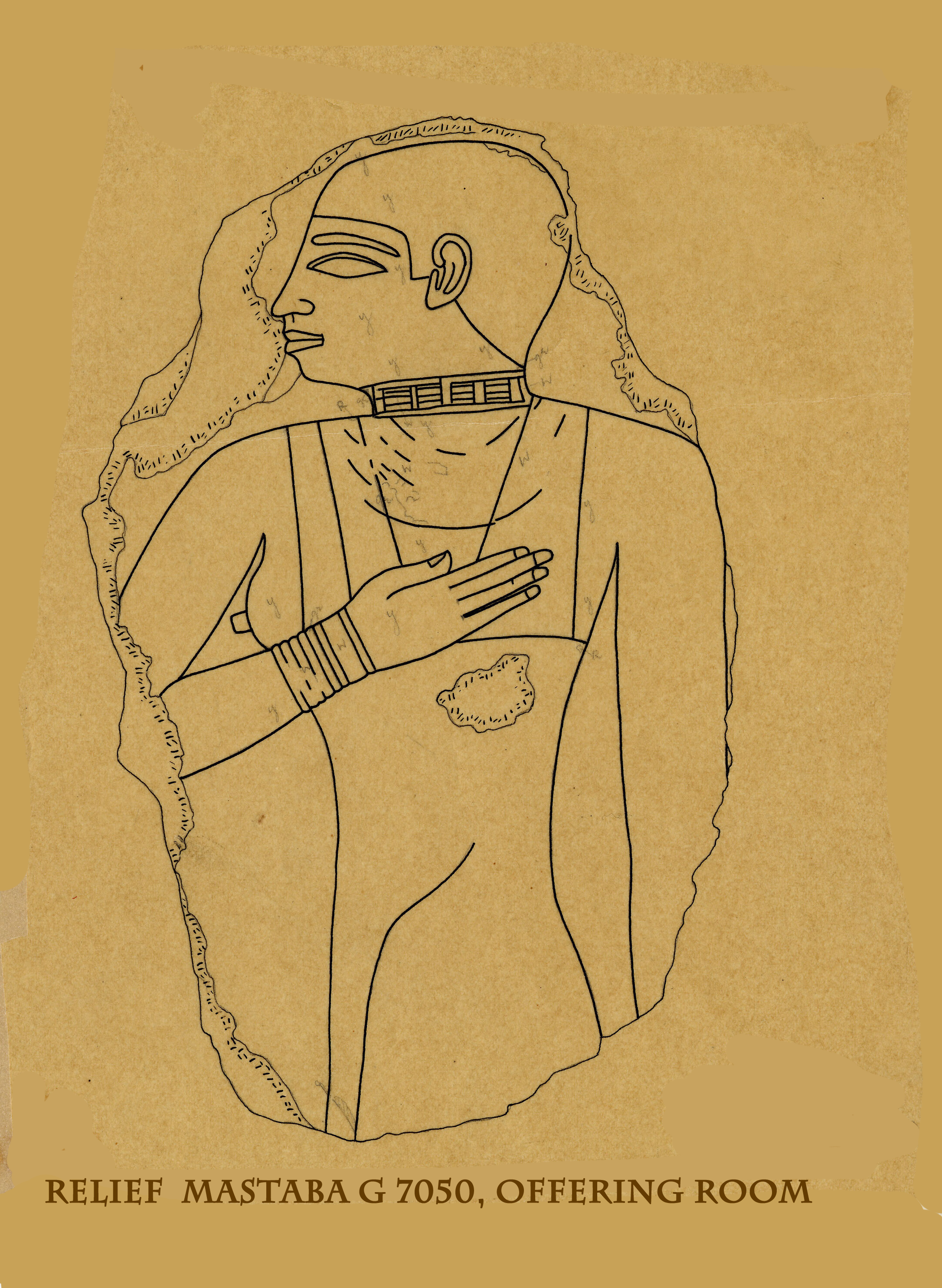
- Years active: c. 2560 BC
- Children: Sneferukhaf
- Parents: Sneferu (father); Unknown ? (mother)

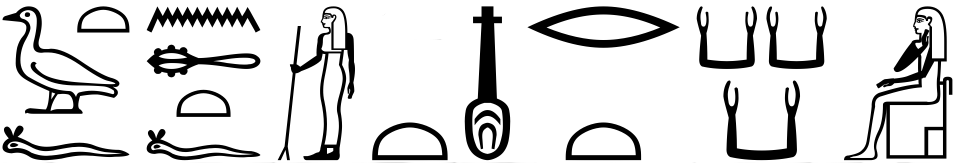
Nefertkau I' nfr.t kʒ.w Nefer-t-kau spelled Nefert-kauw, Nefert-kau, Nefret-kau translated "Charm of the soul Ka" the princess, "King of Upper and Lower Egypt Sneferu, his eldest daughter of his body Nefert-kauw" (Note: Official title as being Princess,) lived during the reigns of Sneferu and Khufu in the 26th century BC.

King Khufu was not the eldest son of Sneferu and although he was undoubtedly a powerful figure, he probably came to the throne through the intrigues of the harem and undoubtedly through his influential mother, Hetepheres I. She seems to have been the daughter of a minor queen of Sneferu, and there is no evidence that she was ever married to Khufu.

After Khufu ascended the throne, there was apparently a split in the family. The two eldest children of Sneferu, Prince Kanefer of Dahshur and Princess Nefert-kau, were given relatively less lavish tombs, (Note: Kanefer mastaba Dahshur M28, Nefert-kau mastaba G 7050) so it seems that Khufu relegated them to a less important position in the family hierarchy. The family might have been reconstructed again on the assumption that Princess Nefert-kau had married a private nobleman, who was buried elsewhere. Nevertheless, separate burials of women, if they weren't queens, haven't been recorded yet, as Reisner noted.

== Mastaba ==
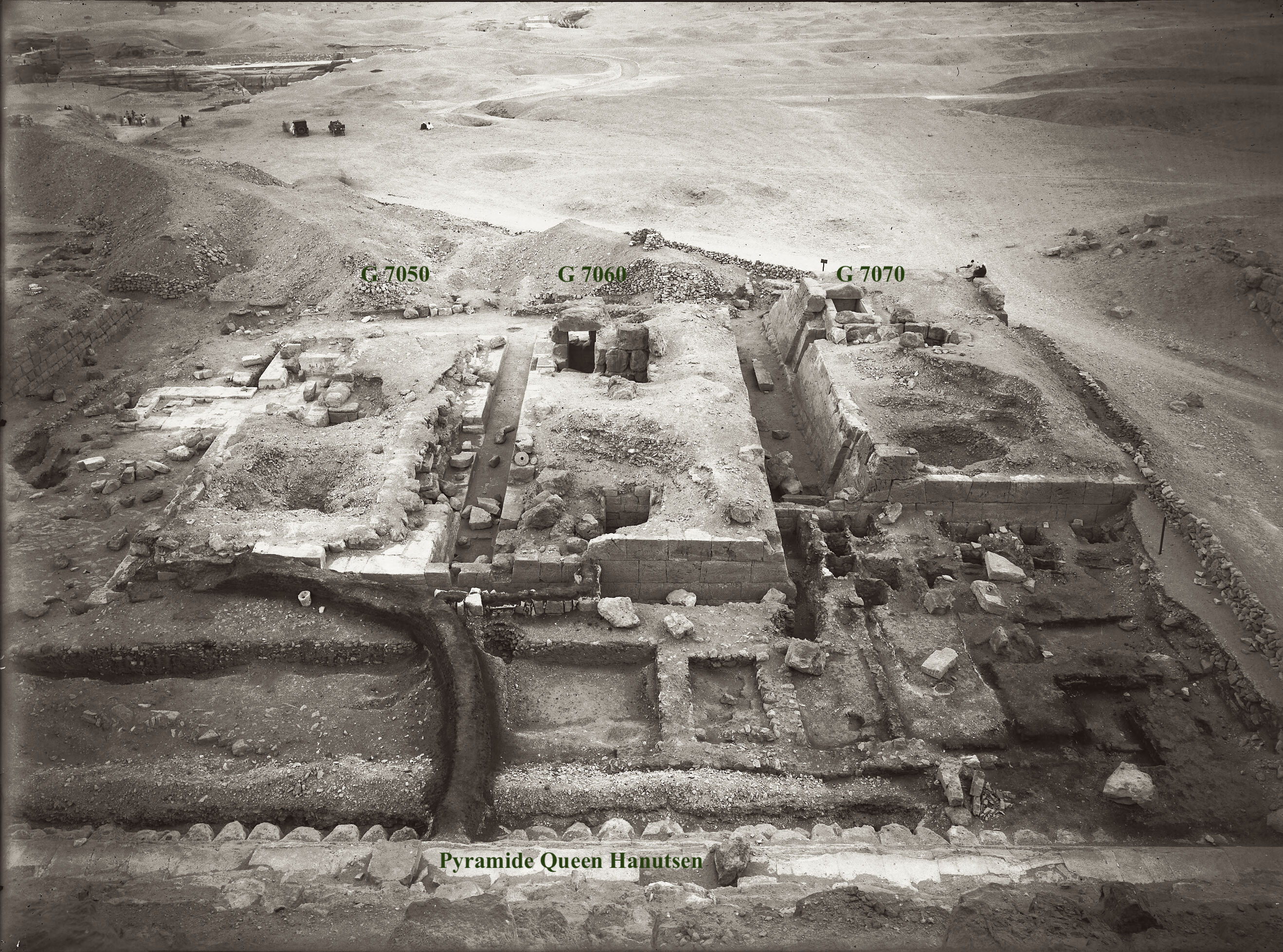
Giza East Cemetery group of three mastabas on the south side of the Queen Henutsen G-1c pyramid

The three mastabas of the Nefert-kau group were built immediately south of this retaining wall of the subsidiary pyramid G I-c, while G 7050 of Nefert-kau was apparently placed as the fourth in a row of tombs of Khufu's queens. These mastabas are part of the early extensions of Khufu's east royal cemetery. The mastaba G 7050 was of peculiar construction with a retaining wall of white limestone backed by nummulitic blocks. Its structure was heavily damaged, and a few relief fragments were found there only, with no scripts for attestation of the owner. There was only one burial southern pit there. The other two mastabas, G 7060 and G 7070 were of the nummulitic type and approximately the same size. These mastabas, which form a family group, were obviously built one after the other and adapted for the queen's mastaba G 7050. It can be dated to the ~13th year of Khufu's reign; all other larger structures that are grouped south of pyramid G I-c around these structures were built later on. Nefert-kau's mastaba G 7050 was identified by the inscriptions in G 7070.

== Nefert-kau family ==
The three mastabas on the south side of Pyramid G I-c have been identified with the family of Nefert-kau based on surviving inscriptions that attest to their relationship. Sethe, based on an epigraphic analysis of the inscription above the false door of mastaba G 7070, attributed to Sneferukhaf, elaborated a more grammatically precise translation of the top line as "King of Upper and Lower Egypt Sneferu, his eldest daughter from his body Nefert-kau, their (both) son, treasurer of the king of Lower Egypt Nefer-maat ", and he deduced from that Sneferukhaf's father was Sneferu and his mother Nefert-kau in their incestuous relationship.

Sethe concluded:

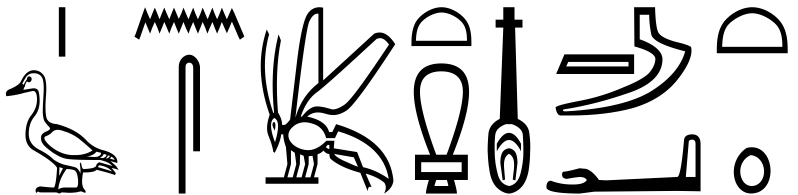
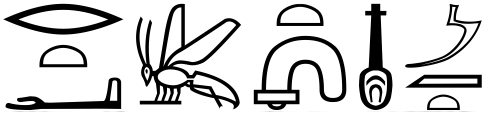
Therefore, if we must recognise Snefru's son in our Nefer-maat, and for better or for worse, as I thought in the wording of the genealogy, then this result is confirmed by the fact that Nefer-maat is most likely the same as the prince of the same name, to whom the magnificent tomb in Medum belonged and who was therefore certainly the son of Sneferu. (Note: Nefer-maat mastaba Meidum No.16 Nefer-maat mastaba LG56)

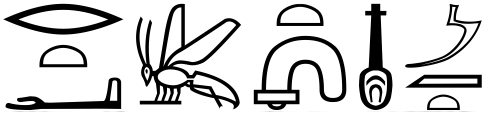
On the other hand, the inscription on the architrave on the outside of the mastaba of Sneferukhaf G 7070 contains the name Nefer-maat that bears the title of "King's son, Hereditary prince, Overlord of Nekheb" Rougé studied two tombs in Giza, already published in the monuments of the Prussian Commission, where there is a reference to the daughter and probably also the son of King Sneferu and described his arguments. Princess parenthood is not questioned, it is presented by the words "King Snefer's daughter on his side the eldest Nefert-kau". The controversy was the hieroglyphic written names Nefer-maat. (Note: Architrave-on the exterior G 7070 2nd line) Could it be Nefert-kau's brother or Snoferu's son? Ruge believed in Mariette's view that he was Nefert-kau's brother, but in both the nuances of hieroglyphic grammatical forms, it would be an incestuous relationship. Sneferu-khaf could be Sneferu's grandson, and in his name he also applied to his Royal family. (Note: Royal Seal holder - Treasurer, Count, Priest of Apis, Friend of King.)

In some societies, such as those from ancient Egypt, brother-sister, father-daughter, mother-son, cousin, aunt-nephew and other combinations incests relations in the royal family were considered to be a means of preserving the royal line, or echoes of ancient religious myths were considered normal.

== Gallery ==
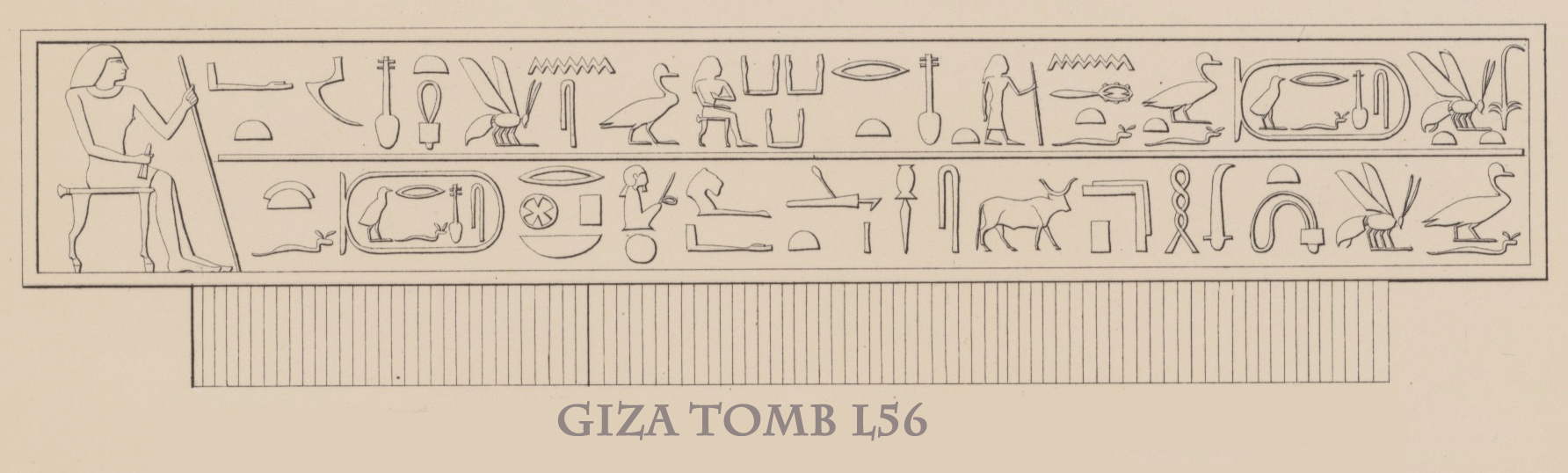
Lintel above mastaba’s false door Giza LG56 (G7070)

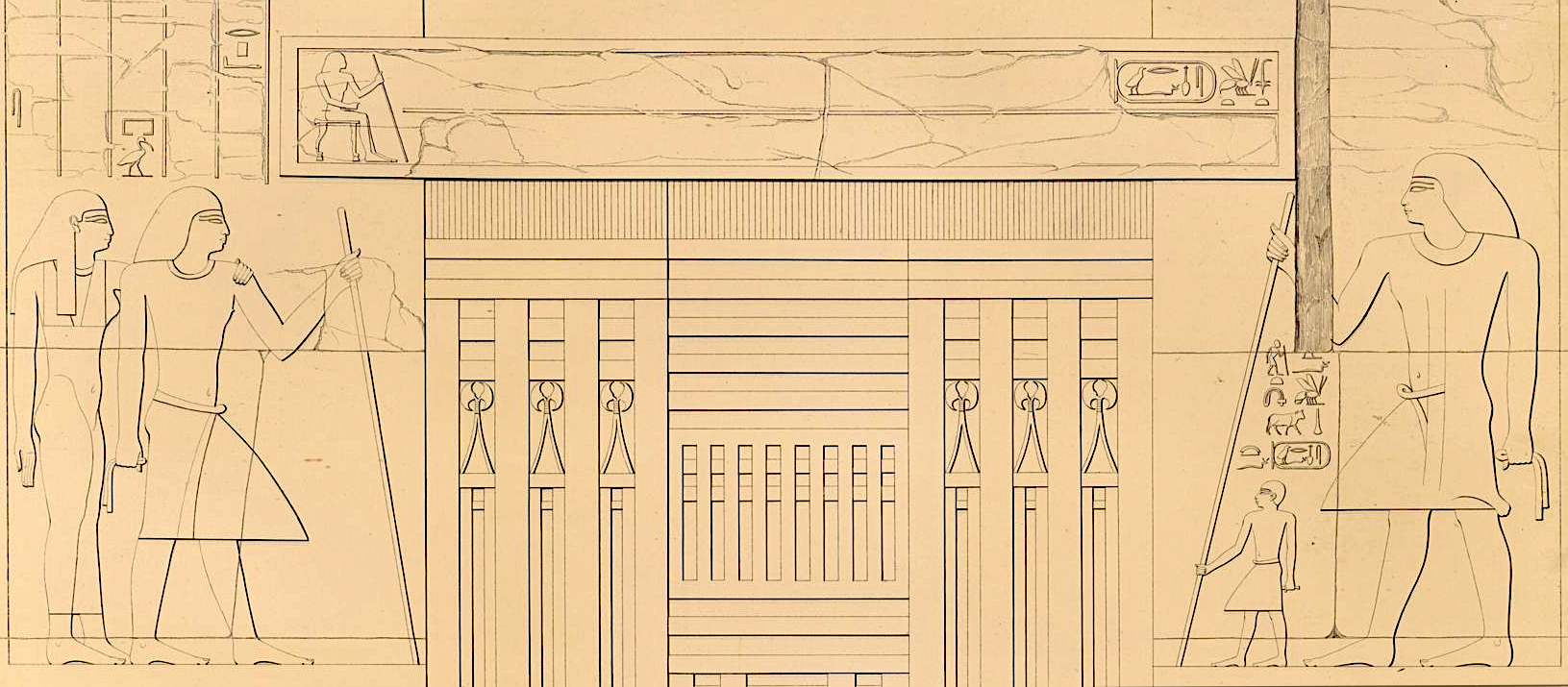
Lintel above a false door, mastaba Giza LG57 (G7060)

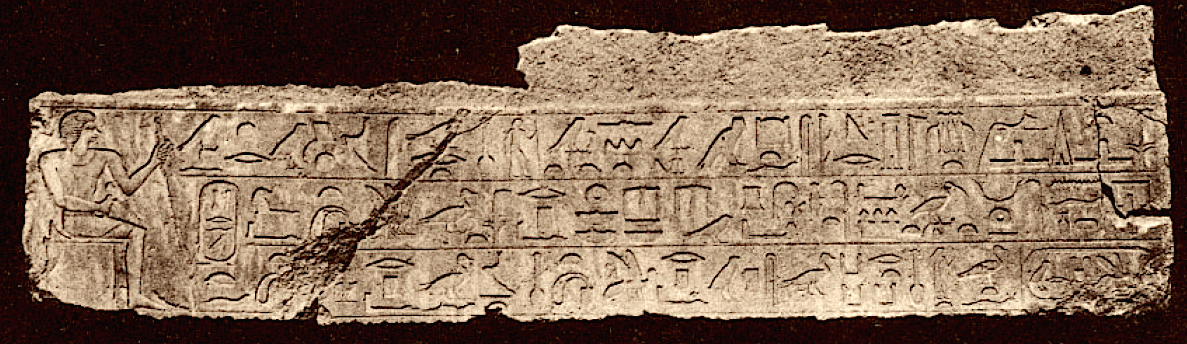
Inscription on the external lintel of the mastaba LG56 (G7070)

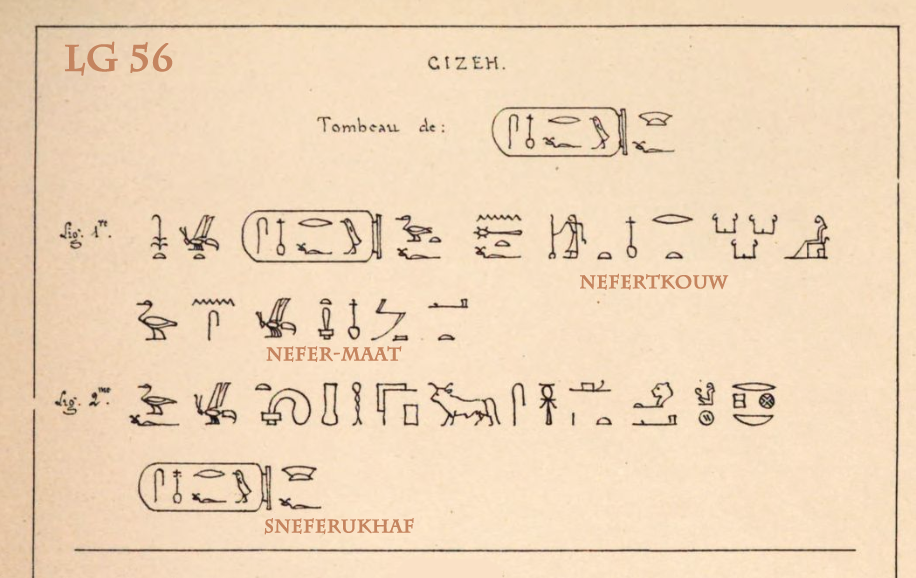
Frame record over false door, mastaba LG56 (G7070)

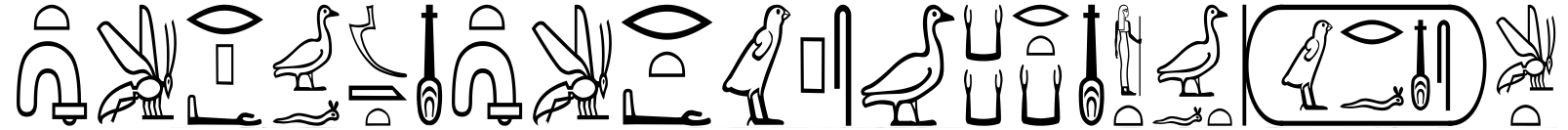
Bottom line
