= Sebat (king's daughter) =

Ancient Egyptian king's daughter of the Twelfth Dynasty

Sebat was an ancient Egyptian king's daughter of the Twelfth Dynasty in the Middle Kingdom of Egypt. She was most likely the daughter of Senusret I and Neferu III, sister of Amenemhat II.

== Life ==
=== King's Daughter ===
Sebat had the title: king's daughter of his body. She is so far only attested on the back slab of a statue base found at Serabit el-Khadim on Sinai. The statues are now lost but once depicted a falcon, king Amenemhat I and king Senusret I. The inscription mentions at the top Amenemhat II and in a lower register Senusret I, the king's daughter Sebat, the king's wife Neferu, Amenemhat I and again Senusret I. From this evidence it seems clear that Sebat was the daughter of Senusret I and Neferu and the sister of Amenemhat II.
