= Governor =

Governing official

A governor is an administrative leader and head of a polity or political region, in some cases, such as governors-general, as the head of a state's official representative. Depending on the type of political region or polity, a governor may be either appointed or elected, and the governor's powers can vary significantly, depending on the public laws in place locally. The adjective pertaining to a governor is gubernatorial, from the Latin root gubernare. In a federated state, the governor may serve as head of state and head of government for their regional polity, while still operating under the laws of the federation, which has its own head of state for the entire federation.

== Ancient empires ==
=== Pre-Roman empires ===
Though the legal and administrative framework of provinces, each administered by a governor, was created by the Romans, the term governor has been a convenient term for historians to describe similar systems in antiquity. Indeed, many regions of the pre-Roman antiquity were ultimately replaced by Roman 'standardized' provincial governments after their conquest by Rome. Plato used the metaphor of turning the Ship of State with a rudder; the Latin word for rudder is gubernaculum.

=== Ancient Egypt ===
In Pharaonic times, the governors of each of the various provinces in the kingdoms of Upper and Lower Egypt (called "nomes" by the Greeks, and whose names often alluded to local patterns of religious worship) are usually known by the Greek word "nomarch," which was later used by historians. Similarly, the term "Haty-a" (governor, mayor, overseer of priests, or overseer of the god's house) was referenced in inscriptions found in tombs, including those of Ankhtifi and Djefaihapi. The Early Dynastic Period saw the establishment of the institution of nomarchs, who were first appointed by the pharaoh to guarantee allegiance, but by the late Old Kingdom, these positions had become hereditary, promoting regional autonomy that grew during the First Intermediate Period and weakened central authority.

=== Pre- and Hellenistic satraps ===
- Media and Achaemenid Persia introduced the satrapy, probably inspired by the Assyrian / Babylonian examples
- Alexander the Great and equally Hellenistic diadoch kingdoms, mainly Seleucids (greater Syria) and Lagids ('Ptolemies' in Hellenistic Egypt)
- in later Persia, again under Iranian dynasties:
  - Parthia
  - the Sassanid dynasty dispensed with the office after Shapur I (who had still 7 of them), replacing them with petty vassal rulers, known as shahdars

=== Ancient Rome ===
From the creation of the earliest Roman subject provinces, a governor was appointed each year to administer each of them. The core function of a Roman governor was as a magistrate or judge, and the management of taxation and the public spending in their area.

Under the Republic and the early Empire, however, a governor also commanded military forces in his province. Republican governors were all men who had served in senior magistracies (the consulate or praetorship) in Rome in the previous year, and carried related titles as governor (proconsul or propraetor). The first emperor, Octavianus Augustus (who acquired or settled a number of new territories; officially his style was republican: Princeps civitatis), divided the provinces into two categories; the traditionally prestigious governorships remained as before (in what have become known as "senatorial" provinces), while in a range of others, he retained the formal governorship himself, delegating the actual task of administration to appointees (usually with the title legatus Augusti). The legatus sometimes would appoint a prefect (later procurator), usually a man of equestrian rank, to act as his deputy in a subregion of the larger province: the infamous character of Pontius Pilate in the Christian Gospels was a governor of this sort.

A special case was Egypt, a rich 'private' domain and vital granary, where the emperor almost inherited the theocratic status of a pharaoh. The emperor was represented there by a governor sui generis styled praefectus augustalis, a title evoking the religious cult of the emperor.

Emperors Diocletian (see Tetrarchy) and Constantine in the third and fourth centuries AD carried out a root and branch reorganisation of the administration with two main features:

- Provinces were divided up and became much more numerous (Italy itself, before the 'colonizing homeland', was brought into the system for the first time); they were then grouped into dioceses, and the dioceses in turn into four praetorian prefectures (originally each under a residing co-emperor);
- Military responsibilities were removed from governors and given to new officials called comes rei militaris (the comital title was also granted to many court and civilian administrative positions) or dux, later also magister militum.

The prestigious governorships of Africa and Asia remained with the title proconsul, and the special right to refer matters directly to the emperor; the praefectus augustalis in Alexandria and the comes Orientis in Antioch also retained special titles. Otherwise, the governors of provinces had various titles, some known as consularis, some as corrector, while others as praeses. Apart from Egypt and the East (Oriens – viz greater Syria), each diocese was directed by a governor known as a vicarius. The prefectures were directed by praefecti praetorio (greatly transformed in their functions from their role in the early Empire).

=== Byzantium ===
This system survived with few significant changes until the collapse of the empire in the West, and in the East, the breakdown of order with the Persian and Arab invasions of the seventh century. At that stage, a new kind of governor emerged, the Strategos. It was a role leading the themes which replaced provinces at this point, involving a return to the amalgamation of civil and military office which had been the practice under the Republic and the early Empire.

=== Legacy ===
While the Roman administration in the West was largely destroyed in the barbarian invasions, its model was remembered; this model became very influential through two particular vehicles: Roman law and the Christian Church.

== Holy Roman/Habsburg Empires and successor states ==
- Reichskommissar

== Turkish rule ==
In the Ottoman Empire, all pashas (generals) administered a province of the Great Sultan's vast empire, with specific titles (such as Mutessaryf; Vali or Wāli which was often maintained and revived in the oriental successor states; Beilerbei (rendered as governor-general, as he is appointed above several provinces under individual governors) and Dey)

== British Empire and Commonwealth realms ==
Flag of the governor of Gibraltar, 1982–present

In the British Empire, a governor was originally an official appointed by the British monarch (or the cabinet) to oversee a crown colony and was the (sometimes notional) head of the colonial administration. The governors' powers varied from colony to colony, depending on its constitutional setup; while all colonies had a separate court system, the governor only had legislative power in colonies that lacked a Legislative Council or Legislative Assembly. The executive powers vested in the governor varied as well; while many colonies had an Executive Council to help with the colony's administration, these ranged from presidential cabinet-like bodies that only served as consultative forums without collective executive powers or functions of their own while the governor had an independent decision-making capacity, to fully fledged parliamentary ministries whose decisions the governor was required to formally execute.

Today, crown colonies of the United Kingdom continue to be administered by governors who hold varying degrees of power. Because of the different constitutional histories of the former colonies of the United Kingdom, the term governor now refers to officials with differing amounts of power.

Administrators, commissioners and high commissioners exercise similar powers to governors. (Note: such high commissioners are not to be confused with the high commissioners who are the equivalent of ambassadors between Commonwealth states).

Frequently the name 'Government House' is given to governors' residences.

The term can also be used in a more generic sense, especially for compound titles which include it: governor-general and lieutenant-governor.

=== Vice-regal governors ===
==== Australia ====
In Australia, each state has the governor as its formal representative of the sovereign, as head of the state government. It is not a political office but a ceremonial one. Each state governor is appointed by the Australian monarch on the advice of the premier, who is the political chief executive of the state government (until 1986, state governors were appointed by the British monarch on the advice of the British government). State governors have emergency reserve powers but these are rarely used. The territories of Australia other than the ACT have administrators instead of governors, who are appointed formally by the governor-general. The governor-general is the representative of and appointed by the King of Australia sovereign at a federal level on the advice of the prime minister of Australia.

As with the governors-general of Australia and other Commonwealth realms, state governors usually exercise their power only on the advice of a government minister.

==== British Hong Kong (1841–1997) ====
In the colonial period of Hong Kong, the governor was the representative of the sovereign from 1843, which was the year that the authorities and duties of the post were officially defined by the Hong Kong Letters Patent and the Royal Instructions, until the handover of Hong Kong to the PRC government in 1997. Each governor was appointed by the monarch and possessed significant powers such as the power of appointing lawmakers in the legislative council, the power to grant land, the power of veto over bills and motions, the power of pardon, etc. At the same time, the governor was also the head of the colonial cabinet, the chairman of the Executive Council, the president of the Legislative Council (until 1993), as well as the commander-in-chief of the British Forces in Hong Kong.

==== British Overseas Territories ====
In the United Kingdom's remaining overseas territories, the governor is normally a direct appointee of the British government and plays an active role in governing and lawmaking (though usually with the advice of elected local representatives). The governor's chief responsibility is for the defence and external affairs of the colony.

In some minor overseas territories, instead of a governor, there is an administrator or commissioner, or the position is held ex officio by a High Commissioner.

==== Canada ====
In Canada, there are governors at the federal and provincial levels of government who, within their jurisdictions, act as representatives of the king of Canada, who is Canada's head of state. The federal governor is the governor general of Canada, and the governor of each province is the lieutenant governor. The governor general is appointed by the sovereign on the advice of the prime minister of Canada, whereas the lieutenant governors are appointed by the governor general on the advice of the prime minister. The role of the governor general and of the lieutenant governors in Canada is largely ceremonial, although they do retain the authority to exercise reserve powers in exceptional circumstances.

Each of the three territories is headed by a commissioner appointed by the federal Cabinet. Unlike provincial lieutenant governors, they are not representatives of the sovereign but rather are representatives of the federal government.

==== New Zealand ====
The governor-general of New Zealand is always the governor of the Ross Dependency, an Antarctic sector which is claimed by the Realm of New Zealand.

==== United Kingdom ====
Within the United Kingdom itself, there was a position of Governor of Northern Ireland from 1922 until the suspension of the devolved Parliament of Northern Ireland in 1973.

===== England =====
From the 16th century until 1995, there was a governor of the Isle of Wight, part of England. Since the reign of Henry VIII, the monarch has borne the title of Supreme Governor of the Church of England.

== Other colonial empires ==
European powers other than the United Kingdom, with colonies in Asia, Africa and elsewhere, gave their top representatives in their colonies the title of governor. Those representatives could be from chartered companies that ruled the colonies. In some of these colonies, there are still officials called governors.

See:

- Danish colonial empire
- Dutch Empire
- Empire of Japan
- French colonial empire
- German colonial empire
- Italian Empire
- Portuguese Empire
- Spanish Empire
- Swedish overseas colonies

== Russia and the Soviet Union ==
In the Russian Empire, the governorate (guberniya) and governorate-general were the main units of territorial and administrative subdivision since the reforms of Peter the Great. These were governed by a governor and governor-general respectively.

A special case was the Chinese Eastern Railway Zone, which was governed as a concession granted by Imperial China to the Russian 'Chinese Eastern Railway Society' (in Russian Obshchestvo Kitayskoy Vostochnoy Zheleznoy Dorogi; established on 17 December 1896 in St. Petersburg, later moved to Vladivostok), which built 1,481 km of tracks (Tarskaya – Hilar – Harbin – Nikolsk-Ussuriski; 3 November 1901 traffic opened) and established on 16 May 1898 the new capital city, Harbin; in August 1898, the defense for Chinese Eastern Railway (CER) across northeast China was assumed by Russia (first under Priamur governor).

On July 1, 1903, the Chinese Eastern Railway was opened and given authority of its own CER Administration (Russian: Upravleniye KVZhD), vested in the Directors of the Chinese Eastern Railway, with the additional quality of Governors of the Chinese Eastern Railway Zone (in Harbin; as such being August 12, 1903 – July 1, 1905 subordinated to the imperial Viceroyalty of the Far East, see Lüshunkou). The post continued to function despite various political changes until after World War II.

Some of the administrative subdivisions of Russia are headed by governors, while others are headed by presidents or heads of administration. From 1991 to 2005, they were elected by popular vote and from 2005 to 2012, they were appointed by the federal president and confirmed by the province's legislature. After the debate, conducted by State Duma in April 2012, the direct elections of governors were expected to be restored.

== Other European countries and empires ==
=== Austria ===
A Landeshauptmann (German for "state captain" or "state governor", literally 'country headman'; plural Landeshauptleute or Landeshauptmänner as in Styria till 1861; Landeshauptfrau is the female form) is an official title in German for certain political offices equivalent to a governor. It has historical uses, both administrative and colonial, and is now used in federal Austria and in South Tyrol, a majority German-speaking province of Italy adjacent to Tyrol.

=== Benelux monarchies ===
- In the Netherlands, the government-appointed heads of the provinces were known as Gouverneur from 1814 until 1850, when their title was changed to King's (or Queen's) Commissioner. In the southern province of Limburg, however, the commissioner is still informally called Governor.
- In the Dutch crown's Caribbean Overseas territories (Aruba, Curaçao and Sint Maarten), the style governor is still used, alongside the political head of government.
- In Belgium, each of the ten provinces has a governor, appointed by the regional government. He represents not only the regional but also the federal government in the province. He controls the local governments and is responsible for law and order, security and emergency action. The national capital of Brussels, which is not part of a province, also has a governor with nearly the same competencies.

=== France ===
During the Ancien Régime in France, the representative of the king in his provinces and cities was the gouverneur. Royal officers were chosen from the highest nobility, and provincial and city governors (oversight of provinces and cities was frequently combined) were predominantly military positions in charge of defense and policing. Provincial governors – also called "lieutenant generals" – also had the ability to convoke provincial parlements, provincial estates and municipal bodies. The title "gouverneur" first appeared under Charles VI. The ordinance of Blois of 1579 reduced their number to 12, but an ordinance of 1779 increased their number to 39 (18 first-class governors, 21 second-class governors). Although in principle, they were the king's representatives and their charges could be revoked at the king's will, some governors had installed themselves and their heirs as a provincial dynasty. The governors were at the height of their power from the middle of the 16th to the middle of the 17th century, but their role in provincial unrest during the civil wars led Cardinal Richelieu to create the more tractable positions of intendants of finance, policing and justice, and in the 18th century the role of provincial governors was greatly curtailed.

=== Germany ===
Until 1933, the term Landeshauptmann (state governor) was used in Prussia for the head of government of a province, In the modern-day states of Germany, the counterpart to Landeshauptmann is the Ministerpräsident (minister-president). In the present German states of Baden-Württemberg, Bavaria, Hesse, and North Rhine-Westphalia there are – and earlier in more German states there were – sub-state administrative regions called in German: Regierungsbezirk, which is sometimes translated into English as governorate. Thus its respective head, in German: Regierungspräsident, is also translated as governor.

=== Greece ===
Ioannis Kapodistrias was the first (and, with the exception of the short tenure of his younger brother Augustinos Kapodistrias, the only) head of state of Greece to bear the title of governor.

=== Italy ===
- The essentially maritime empire of the Venetian republic, comprising Terra Firma, other Adriatic (mainly Istria and Dalmatia) and further Mediterranean (mainly Greek) possessions, used different styles, such as (castelleno e) provveditore (generale) or baile.
- In the fascist regime there was the governor of the colonies of the Italian colonial empire.
- In today's Italy, the official name of a head of a Regione (the Italian subnational entity) is Presidente della Giunta regionale (President of the regional executive council). Since 2000, when a constitutional reform decided the direct election of the president by the people, out of perceived analogy with the US equivalent, there has been a practice among journalists to call the official governatore/governatrice (governor), although other people would normally prefer to use presidente/presidentessa della Regione (Regional president) informally.
- In the various Italian provinces (former principalities and city-states) that became amalgamated as the Papal States, the Holy See exerted temporal power via its legates and delegates, including some cardinals
- Also in Avignon and the surrounding southern French Comtat Venaissin, the home of the popes during their 'Babylonian exile', and retained centuries after, but never incorporated into the Papal States, legates and vice-legates were appointed.
- The sovereign modern remnant of the formerly large Papal States, the tiny Vatican City State, is now a mere enclave in Rome, the capital of Italian Republic. As it is too small to have further administrative-territorial divisions, it is the equivalent of a prime minister, governor and mayor all rolled into one post, styled the Governor of Vatican City.

== Other modern Asian countries ==
=== China ===
In the People's Republic of China, the title Governor (Chinese: 省长; pinyin: shěngzhǎng) refers to the highest ranking executive of a provincial government. The governor is usually placed second in the provincial power hierarchy, below the secretary of the provincial Chinese Communist Party (CCP) committee (省委书记), who serves as the highest ranking party official in the province. Governors are elected by the provincial congresses and approved by the provincial party chief. All governors are not locals in the provinces which they govern.

The title can be also used while referring to a county governor (县长).

=== India ===
In India, each state has a ceremonial governor appointed by the president of India. These governors are different from the governors who controlled the British-controlled portions of the Indian Empire (as opposed to the princely states) prior to 1947.

A governor is the head of a state in India. Generally, a governor is appointed for each state, but after the 7th Constitutional Amendment, of 1956, one governor can be appointed for more than one state.

=== Indonesia ===
In Indonesia, the title gubernur refers to the highest-ranking executive of a provincial government. The governor and the vice governor are elected by a direct vote from the people as a couple candidate, so the governor is responsible to the provincial residents. The governor has a term of five years to work in office and can be re-elected for another single period. In case of death, disability, or resignation, the vice governor would stand in as acting governor for some time before being inaugurated as the permanent governor.

The elected governor is inaugurated by the president, or by the Indonesian minister of home affairs on behalf of the president. In addition, the governor is the representative of the central government in the province and is responsible to the president. The governor's authority is regulated within Law (Indonesian: Undang-undang) No. 32/2004 and Governmental Ordinance (Indonesian: Peraturan Pemerintah) No. 19/2010.

Principally, the governor has the tasks and the authorities to lead governmental services in the province, based upon the policies that have been made together with the provincial parliament. The governor is not the superordinate of regents or mayors, but only guides supervises, and coordinates the works of city/municipal and regency governments. In other parts, municipal and regency governments have the right to manage each governance affairs based on the autonomy principle and assistantship duties.

=== Japan ===
In Japan, the title Governor (知事, chiji) refers to the highest ranking executive of a prefectural government. The governor was elected by a direct vote from the people and had a fixed term of four years. There is no restriction on the number of terms a person may serve as governor. The governor holds considerable power within the prefecture, including the ability to veto ordinances that have been passed by the prefecture assembly, as well as control of the prefecture's budget and the power to dissolve the prefecture assembly. The governor can be subjected to a recall referendum. A total of one to four vice governors are appointed by the governor with the approval of the assembly. In the case of the governor's death, disability, or resignation, a vice governor would stand in as governor or acting governor.

See List of governors of Japan for a list of the current governors.

=== Malaysia ===
In Malaysia, each of the four non-monarchical states (Penang, Malacca, Sabah and Sarawak) has a ceremonial governor styled Yang di-Pertua Negeri, appointed to a renewable four-year term by the Yang di-Pertuan Agong, the federal King of Malaysia, on the advice of the prime minister after consulting the state governments. Each of these states has a separate head of government called the Ketua Menteri or chief minister. The four Yang di-Pertua Negeri are members of the Conference of Rulers; however, they cannot participate in the election of the Yang di-Pertuan Agong, discussions related to the privileges of the Malay rulers and matters concerning the observance of Islam.

=== Pakistan ===
In Pakistan, each of the four provinces has a governor who is appointed by the president. The governor is the representative of the federal in their province and is the ceremonial head of the province whereas the chief minister is the head of the provincial government. The governor exercises powers similar to the president's, in their respective province.

=== Philippines ===
In the Philippines, the highest-ranking executive of a province is styled Governor (Gobernador or Punong Lalawigan in Filipino). The governor is elected by direct vote of the people with a fixed term of three years. A governor can serve only up to a maximum of three consecutive terms. He may, however, be suspended by either the ombudsman or the President through the secretary of the interior and local government. He may be removed by the president if found guilty of an administrative case or a criminal act during his tenure. He may be subjected to a recall vote, but unlike a referendum, the voters elect the governor of their choice. In case of death, disability, resignation, forced removal, or suspension, the vice governor, elected separately in the same election for governor, succeeds as governor, or acting governor, as the case may be.

During both the Spanish and American colonial periods, as well as during the Japanese occupation of World War II, the chief executive of the Philippines was the Governor-general of the Philippines.

The highest ranking executive of the former Autonomous Region in Muslim Mindanao was called regional governor, elected for a term of three years and if vacating office, replaced by a regional vice-governor. Bangsamoro, its replacement, has the Wa'lī (Arabic for "governor") as ceremonial head of the region, elected by parliament for a six-year term.

=== Sri Lanka ===
The provincial councils of the nine provinces of Sri Lanka are headed by governors, as representatives of the president. Prior to 1948, in Ceylon (former name for Sri Lanka), the governor of Ceylon was the head of the British colony.

=== Thailand ===
In Thailand, the title Governor (ผู้ว่าราชการ Phuwa Ratcha Gaan in Thai) refers to the administrator of each Thai province, who is appointed by the Ministry of Internal Affairs. The only exception is the specially governed district of Bangkok, whose governor is elected by its population.

== Other modern countries in North America ==
=== Mexico ===
In Mexico, governor refers to the elected leader of each of the nation's thirty-one Free and Sovereign States with the official Spanish title being Gobernador. Mexican governors are directly elected by the citizens of each state for a six-year term and cannot be re-elected.

=== United States ===
In the United States, the title "Governor" refers to the head of each state or insular territory. Governors retain sovereign power over executive and judiciary, are subordinate to the president of the United States and laws provided by the enumerated powers section of the federal constitution, and serve as the political and ceremonial head of the state. Nearly three-fourths of the states (36) hold gubernatorial elections in the same years as midterm elections (two years offset from presidential elections). Eleven states hold them in the same years as presidential elections (Vermont and New Hampshire hold elections every two years in every even-numbered year), while the remaining five hold them in odd-numbered years (two in the year after a presidential election, three in the year before).

In colonial North America, governors were chosen in a variety of ways, depending on how the colony was organized. In the crown colonies of Great Britain, France, and Spain, the governor was chosen by the ruling monarch of the colonizing power or his designees; in British colonies, the Board of Trade was often the primary decision maker. Colonies based on a corporate charter, such as the Connecticut Colony and the Massachusetts Bay Colony, elected their own governors based on rules spelt out in the charter or other colonial legislation. In proprietary colonies, such as the Province of Carolina before it became a crown colony (and was divided into North and South), governors were chosen by the Lords Proprietor who controlled the colony. In the early years of the American Revolutionary War, eleven of the Thirteen Colonies evicted (with varying levels of violence) royal and proprietary governors. The other two colonies (Connecticut and Rhode Island) had corporate charters; Connecticut Governor Jonathan Trumbull was governor before and during the war period, while in Rhode Island, Governor Joseph Wanton was removed from office in 1775 for failing to support the rebel war effort.

Before achieving statehood, many of the fifty states were territories. Administered by the federal government, they had governors who were appointed by the president and confirmed by the Senate rather than elected by the resident population.

== Other modern countries in Oceania ==
=== Papua New Guinea ===
In Papua New Guinea, the leaders of the provinces have been known as governors since August 1995. Previously they were called premiers.

== Other modern countries in South America ==
Many of the South American republics (such as Chile and Argentina) have provinces or states run by elected governors, with offices similar in nature to U.S. state governors.

=== Brazil ===
Until the 1930 Revolution, the heads of the Brazilian Provinces, now called States, were styled as (provincial/state) presidents (presidentes). From 1930 to 1945, they were styled either governors (governadores) or, when appointed by the federal government, intervenors (interventores). From 1945 on, they have only been called governors.

== Modern equivalents ==
As a generic term, governor is used for various 'equivalent' politician who are the head of a state or province, rendering other official titles such as:

- Minister
- Administrators

This also applies to non-western or antique culture

== Other meanings of the word ==
The word governor refers to a member of confederation of governors of a private sector entity who is a shareholder and elected by all of the other shareholders of that private sector entity to be a member of confederation of governors at a private sector entity (for profit and non-profit).

== See also ==
- Bey
- Chief executive
- Chief minister
- Deputy governor
- Governorate
- Governor-in-chief
- Governor-general
- Lieutenant governor
- Premier
- Viceroy
- Voivode
