= Neferu III =

Egyptian queen of the 12th Dynasty

Neferu
nfr nfr nfr B1

Queen consort of Egypt
- Tenure: c. 1950 BC
- King: Senusret I
- Spouse: Senusret I
- Issue: Amenemhat II
- Father: Amenemhat I
- Mother: Neferitatjenen

Neferu (English: Beauty; fl. c. 1950 BC) was an ancient Egyptian queen of the 12th Dynasty in the Middle Kingdom of Egypt. She was a daughter of Amenemhat I, sister-wife of Senusret I, and the mother of Amenemhat II.

== Life ==
Neferu III is known from several monuments with her titles: King's Daughter; King's Wife; King's Mother.

=== King's Daughter ===
Neferu III is one of the four known children of Amenemhat I. She was the king's daughter of Amenemhat I and likely born to Neferitatjenen. She was the king's sister of Senusret I, but this title is not attested.

=== King's Wife ===
She married her brother Senusret I, and was his only wife, so far as is known. She is mentioned as his wife in the Story of Sinuhe. Her name appears on fragments in her father's pyramid at Lisht and in her son's Serabit el-Khadim chapel which was built as a memorial for Senusret I. She had a pyramid in her husband's pyramid complex, but it is possible she was buried not there, but rather in Dahshur, near her son.

=== King's Mother ===
Neferu III was the mother of Amenemhat II.
