= Senusret I =

Pharaoh of Egypt

- Sesostris, Sesonchosis
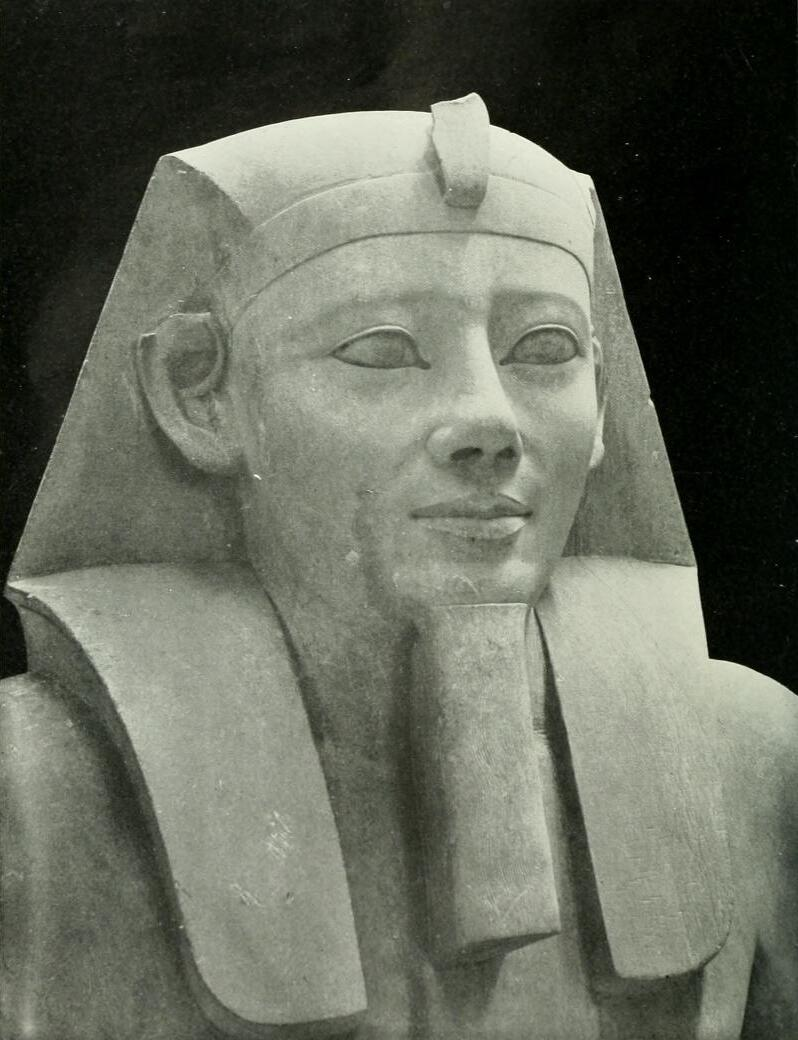
- Statue of Senusret I

Pharaoh
- Reign: c. 1962 – c. 1926 BC
- Predecessor: Amenemhat I
- Successor: Amenemhat II
Royal titulary
Horus name
Ankhmesut
ˁnḫ-msw.t
Horus, Living of births
G5	anx ms w t
Nebty name
Ankhmesut
ˁnḫ-msw.t
Living of births
G16	anx ms w t
Golden Horus
Ankhmesut
ˁnḫ-msw.t
Living of births
G8 anx ms w t
Prenomen
Kheperkare
Ḫpr-k3-Rˁ
The Ka of Ra is created
M23 t L2 t < ra xpr kA >
Turin canon:
[...]ka
…k3
< HASH HASH D28 Z1 G7 > HASH
Nomen
Senusret
S(j)-n-Wsrt
Man of Wosret

G39 N5	F12 s D21 t z n
- Consort: Neferu III
- Children: Amenemhat II, Itakayt, and Sebat
- Father: Amenemhat I
- Mother: Neferitatjenen
- Died: c. 1926 BC
- Burial: Pyramid of Senusret I, Giza, Egypt
- Monuments: White Chapel
- Dynasty: 12th Dynasty of Egypt

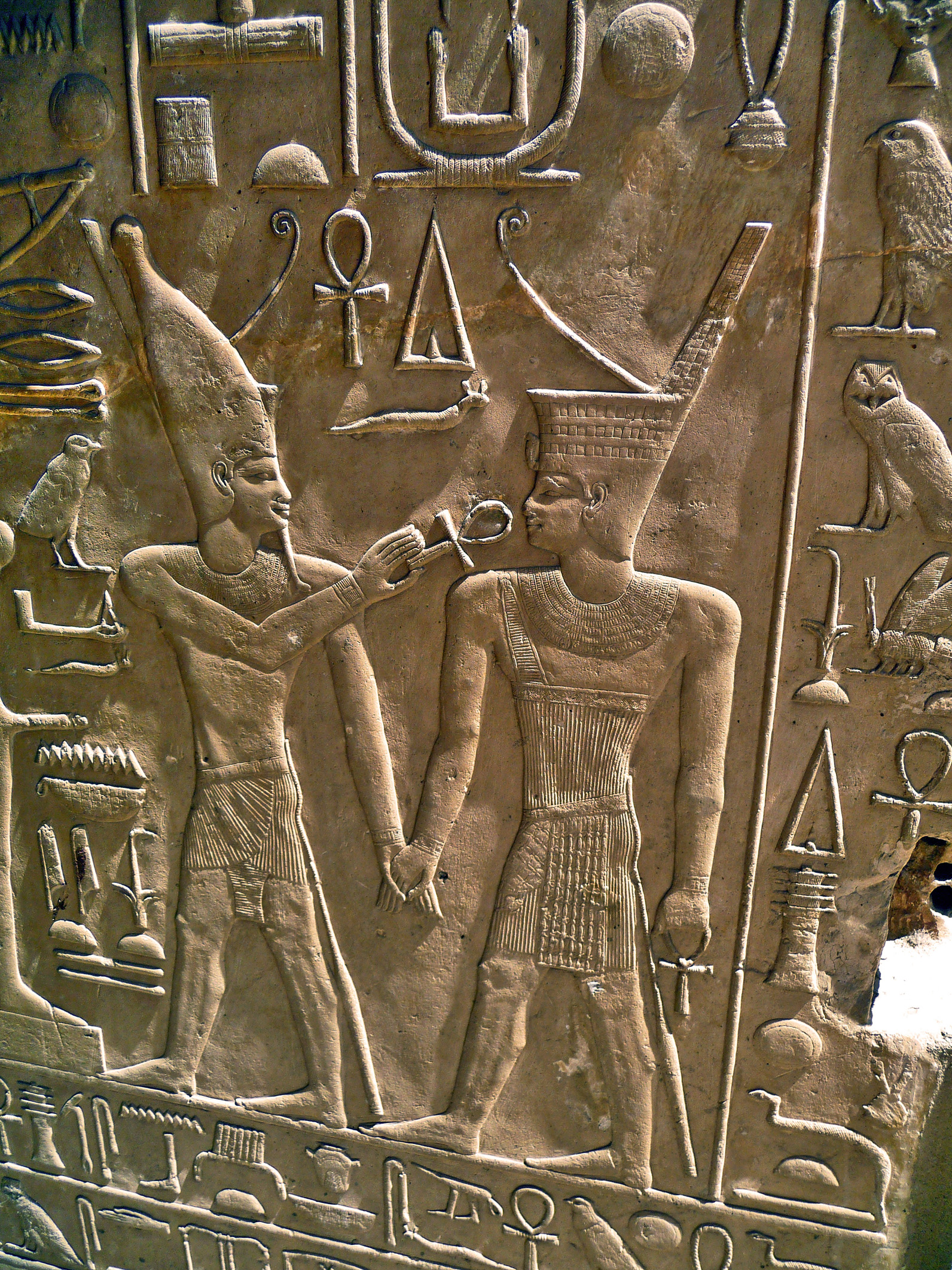
Relief showing Kheperkare Senusret I, Karnak

Senusret I (Middle Egyptian: z-n-wsrt; /suʀ nij ˈwas.ɾiʔ/) also anglicized as Sesostris I and Senwosret I (died c. 1926 BC) was the second king of the 12th Dynasty of Egypt, and was one of the most powerful kings of the dynasty. He was the son of Amenemhat I. Senusret I was known by his prenomen, Kheperkare, which means "the Ka of Re is created." He expanded the territory of Egypt, allowing him to rule during an age of prosperity.

== Family ==
The family relations of the king are well known. Senusret I was the son of Amenemhat I. His mother was a queen with the name Neferitatjenen.

His main wife was Neferu III who was also his sister.

=== Children with Neferu ===
- Amenemhat II: His son and successor
- Itakayt
- Sebat: most likely a daughter of Neferu as she appears with the latter together in one inscription.

== Reign ==
He continued his father's aggressive expansionist policies against Nubia by initiating two expeditions into this region in his 10th and 18th years and established Egypt's formal southern border near the second cataract where he placed a garrison and a victory stele. He also organized an expedition to a Western Desert oasis. Senusret I established diplomatic relations with some rulers of towns in Syria and Canaan. He also tried to centralize the country's political structure by supporting nomarchs who were loyal to him. His pyramid was constructed at el-Lisht. Senusret I is mentioned in the Story of Sinuhe where he is reported to have rushed back to the royal palace in Memphis from a military campaign in Libya after hearing about the assassination of his father, Amenemhat I.

=== Accession ===
==== Coregency ====
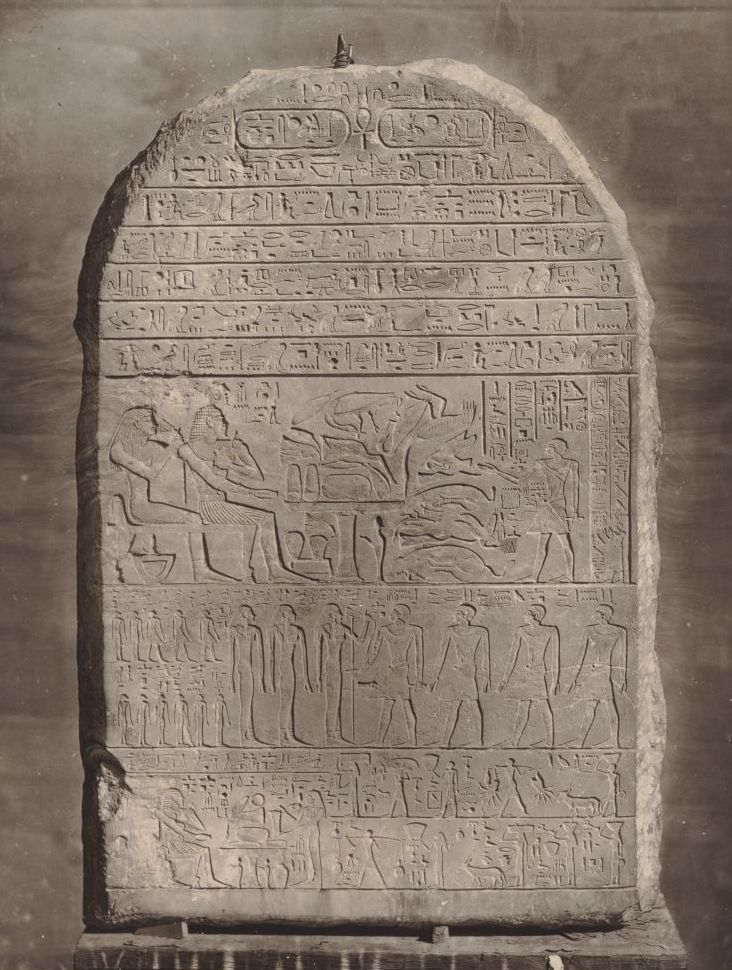
The double dated stela CG 20516

In Year 21 of Amenemhat I, a coregency was established with Senusret I celebrating his Year 1 as junior coregent (Horus), while his father became senior coregent (Osiris). A double dated stele from Abydos and now in the Cairo Museum (CG 20516) is dated to the Year 30 of Amenemhat I and to the Year 10 of Senusret I.

=== Sole Reign ===
Assassination of Amenemhat. In Year 30 of Amenemhat I and Year 10 of Senusret I of the coregency, his father Amenemhat I was assassinated. At the time, Senusret I was leading a campaign in Libya, likely to conduct raids that would fund the extravagant costs of the upcoming Sed festival of his father. This marked the beginning of the sole reign of Senusret I. As recounted in the Story of Sinuhe, a famous text of Egyptian literature:

Year 30, third month of the Inundation season, day 7, the god mounted to his horizon, the King of Upper and Lower Egypt Sehetepibre (Amenemhat I) went aloft to heaven and became united with the sun's disk, the limb of the god being merged in him who made him; whilst the Residence was hushed, hearts were in mourning, the Great Gates were closed, the courtiers crouched, head on lap, and the nobles grieved. Now His Majesty had sent an army to the land of the Tjemeh (Libyans), his eldest son as the captain thereof, the god Senusret (Senusret I). He had been sent to smite the foreign countries, and to take prisoner the dwellers in the Tjehnu-land, and now indeed he was returning and had carried off living prisoners of the Tjehnu and all kinds of cattle limitless. And the Companions of the Palace sent to the western side to acquaint the king's son concerning the position that had arisen in the Royal Apartments, and the messengers found him upon the road, they reached him at time of night. Not a moment did he linger, the falcon flew off with his followers, not letting his army know. But the king's children who accompanied him in this army had been sent for and one of them had been summoned. (...)

As Senusret was informed of the attack by a messenger while still on campaign, he likely also learned that several of his brothers, present in the army, may have been involved in the conspiracy that lead to Amenemhat's assassination. Without alerting anyone, he returned hastily to the palace, leaving his forces behind, fearing he might also become a target. The exact means by which he regained control of the government or secured the throne remain unknown. It is historically attested that a civil war broke out shortly afterwards and that Senusret was forced to brutally suppress seditious forces aligned against him.

Nubian campaign. In Year 18 of Senusret I, he launched a military campaign against Lower Nubia and conquered the region down to the Second Cataract. The date of the expedition is mentioned on a stela from Buhen. The military campaign is mentioned in several inscriptions of this king's reign. Several local officials were involved with the military expedition. Amenemhat, governor of the Oryx nome went there with the title overseer of troops.

Famine. In Year 25, Egypt was devastated by a famine caused by a low Nile flood.

Elephantine. In Year 43, a rock inscription is dated to the king by Ameny (PD 91; title: jrj-pꜥt; ḥꜣtj-ꜥ; ḫtmw-bjtj; smr-wꜥtj; jmj-rꜣ sḫtjw jmnjj).

=== Expeditions ===
Senusret I dispatched several quarrying expeditions to the Sinai Peninsula and Wadi Hammamat.

In Wadi Hammamat, a series of inscriptions are known: Hammamat 3042 (royal name), Hammamat G 61 (Year 38), Hammamat G 62, Hammamat G 63, Hammamat G 64 = M 123 (Year 16), Hammamat G 65 (royal name), Hammamat G 66 (royal name), Hammamat G 67 (Year 2), Hammamat G 75 (Year 33 of unnamed king), Hammamat G 83, Hammamat G 86, Hammamat M 87 (Year 38), Hammamat M 116, Hammamat M 117 (royal name), Hammamat M 120 (Year 16?), Hammamat M 121 (Year 16?), Hammamat M 122 (Year 16?), Hammamat M 124 (Year 16?), and Hammamat Kischel GM 175.

=== Building program ===
He built numerous shrines and temples throughout Egypt and Nubia during his long reign.

Heliopolis. He rebuilt the important temple of Re-Atum in Heliopolis which was the centre of the sun cult. He erected 2 red granite obelisks there to celebrate his Year 30 Heb Sed Jubilee. One of the obelisks still remains and is the oldest standing obelisk in Egypt. It is now in the Al-Masalla (Obelisk in Arabic) area of Al-Matariyyah district near the Ain Shams district (Heliopolis). It is 67 feet tall and weighs 120 tons or 240,000 pounds.

Abydos. Senusret remodelled the Temple of Khenti-Amentiu Osiris at Abydos.

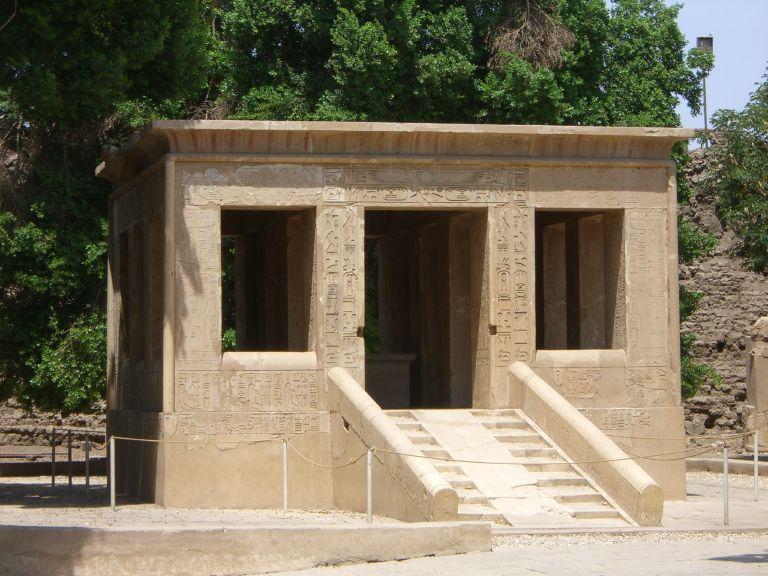
The White Chapel of Senusret I at Karnak

Karnak. A shrine (known as the White Chapel or Jubilee Chapel) with fine, high quality reliefs of Senusret I, was built at Karnak to commemorate his Year 30 jubilee. During the New Kingdom it was demolished and used as filler for the Third Pylon of the temple of Karnak, Precinct of Amun-Re. It has subsequently been successfully reconstructed from various stone blocks discovered by Henri Chevrier in 1926.

Elephantine. He did work at the Temple of Satet on Elephantine.

Building projects at other major temples include the temple of Min at Koptos, the Montu-temple at Armant and the Montu-temple at El-Tod, where a long inscription of the king is preserved.

=== Succession ===
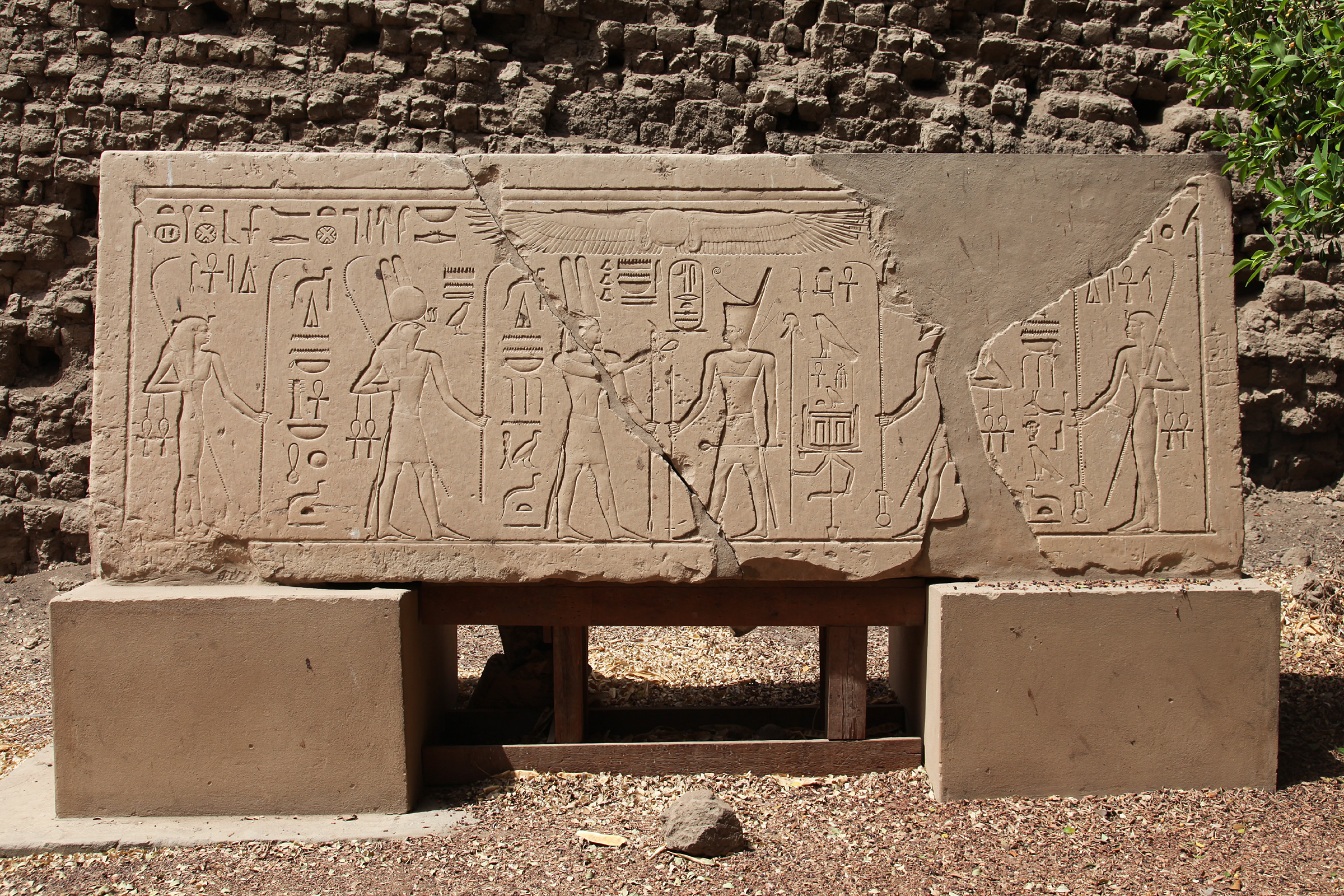
Lintel of Senusret I showing Senusret (center right) receiving blessings from Amun (center left) while the gods Horus (left) and Set (right) look on at them. Found at the Cachette court in the Precinct of Amun-Re. Now at the Karnak open air museum.

==== Coregency ====
In Year 43 of Senusret, he appointed his son Amenemhat II as his junior coregent (Horus). Most likely in his 60s, Senusret I became the senior coregent (Osiris) with a more retiring administrative role. The stele of Wepwawet-aa is dated to Year 44 of Senusret I and Year 2 of Amenemhet II, thus a coregency was established in Year 43. Others suggest the two dates only refer to the period Wepwawet-aa was in office.

==== Reign length ====
The Turin King List 6:21 provides a reign length of 45 regnal years. The number of months and days are missing. His highest attested date is Year 44, such as the stele of Wepwawet-aa.

== Royal Court ==
Some of the key members of the court of Senusret I are known.

=== The Vizier ===
The royal court was headed by the vizier. The vizier at the beginning of his reign was Intefiqer, who is known from many inscriptions and from his tomb next to the pyramid of Amenemhat I. He seems to have held this office for a long period of time and was followed by a vizier named Senusret.

=== The Treasurer ===
Two treasurers are known from the reign of the king: Sobekhotep (year 22) and Mentuhotep. The latter had a huge tomb next to the pyramid of the king and he seems to have been the main architect of the Amun temple at Karnak.

=== The High Stewards ===
Several high stewards are attested. Hor is known from several stelae and from an inscription in the Wadi el-Hudi where he was evidently the leader of an expedition for amethyst. One of the stelae is dated to Year 9 of the king. A certain Nakht followed in office attested around Year 12 of the king. He had a tomb at Lisht. A certain Antef, son of a woman called Zatamun is known again from several stelae, one dates to Year 24 another one to Year 25 of Senusret I. Another Antef was the son of a woman called Zatuser and was most likely also high steward in the king's reign.

=== The Nomarchs ===
A nomarch was a governor of a province into which Upper and Lower Egypt was subdivided.

- Amenemhat Oryx (UE 16)
- Djefaihapi of Asyut (UE 13; PD 777)
- Sarenput I of Elephantine (UE 01)

== Death ==
In Year 45 of Senusret I, he died and Amenemhat II became sole ruler. Senusret is thought to have died during his 46th year on the throne since the Turin Canon ascribes him a reign of 45 Years. When the co-regencies with Amenemhat I and Amenemhat II are deducted, he ruled as sole king for just over 30 years.

=== Pyramid ===
At Lisht, Senusret I was buried in his Pyramid Complex inside the Pyramid of Senusret I.

== Ancestry ==
Ancestors of Senusret I

Senusret
Amenemhat I
Nefret
Senusret I
Neferitatjenen

== Gallery ==
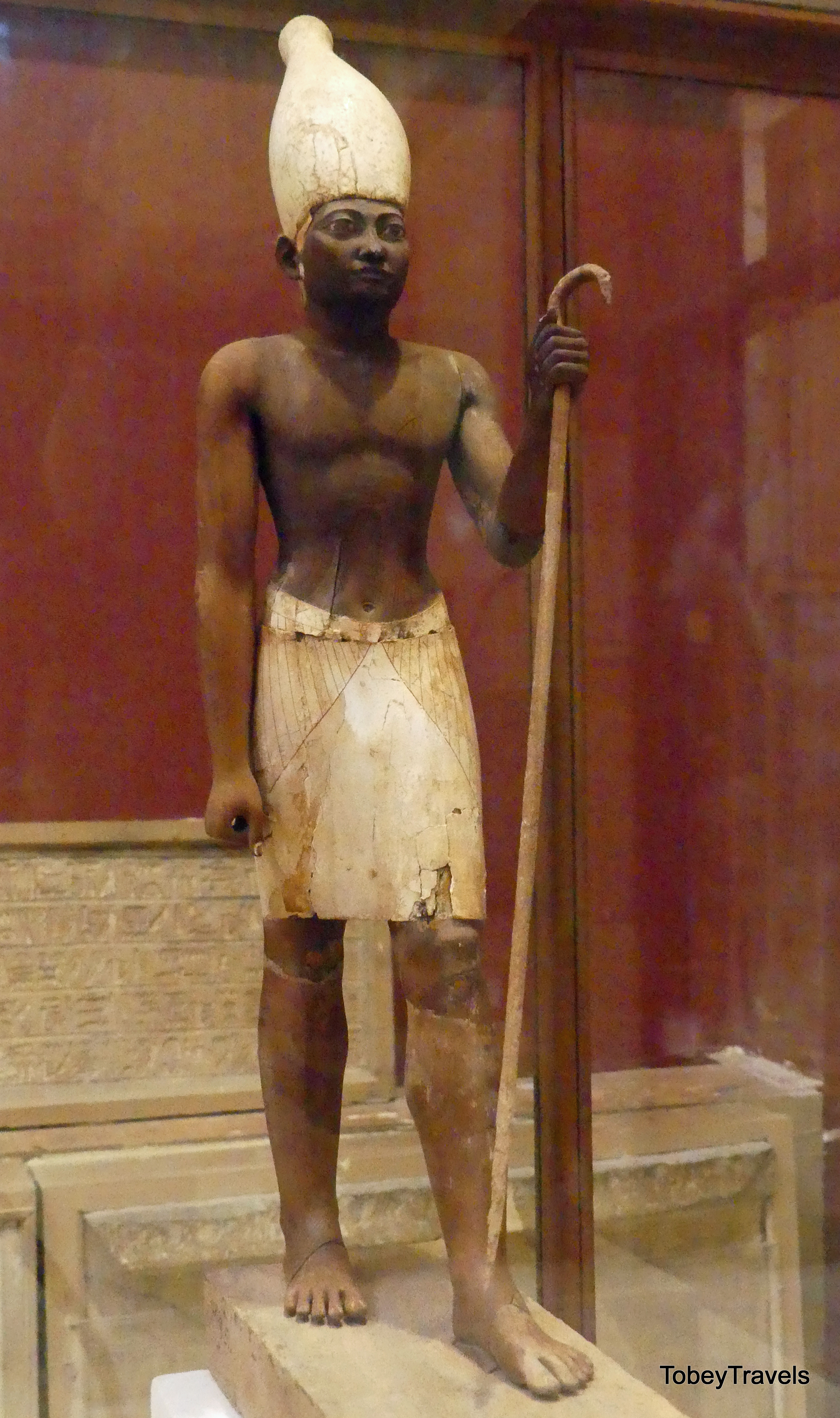
Senusret I Statuette, Painted Cedar with Gesso, Egyptian Museum, Cairo

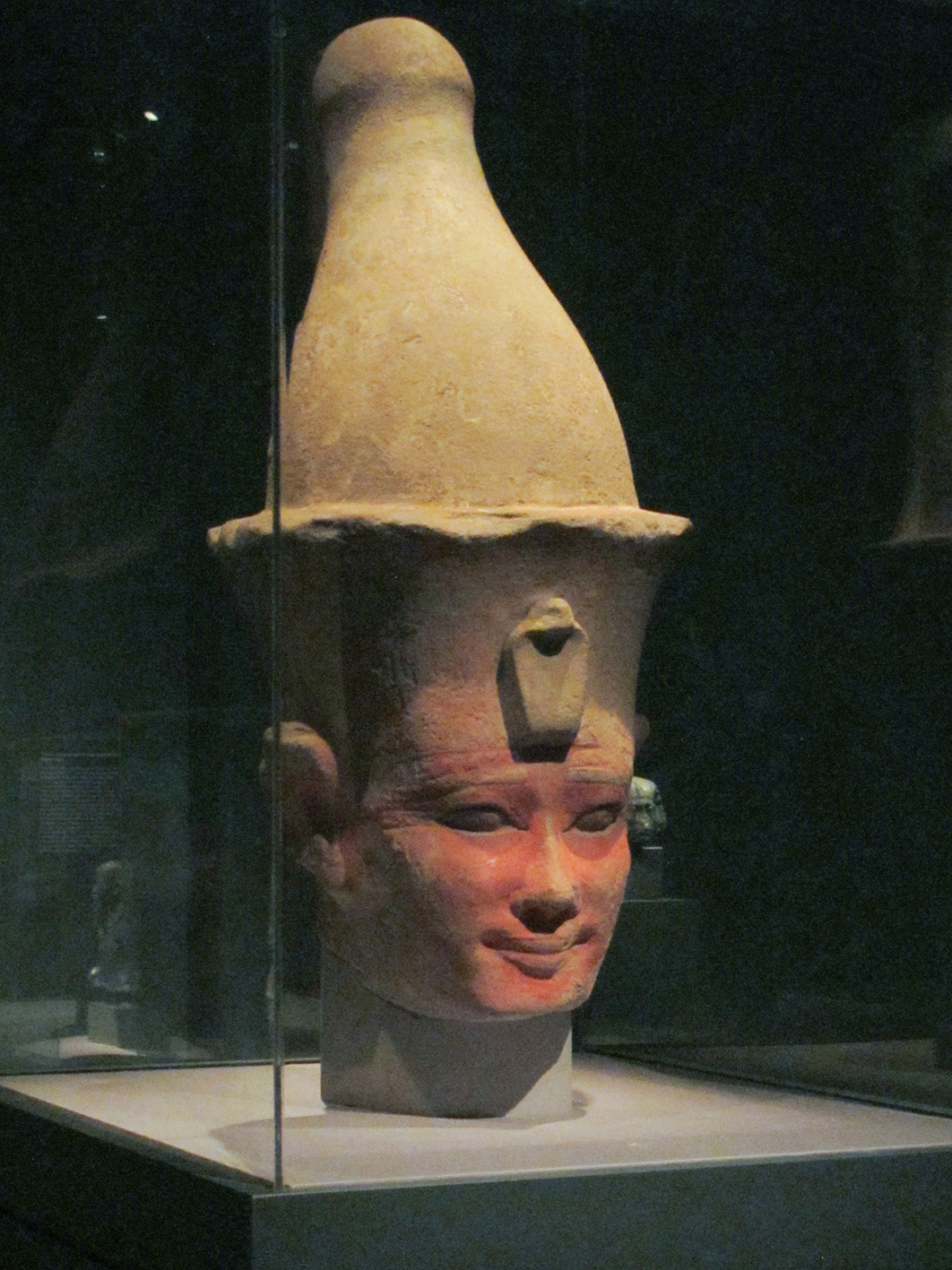
Head statue of Senusret I now on display in the Medelhavsmuseet, Stockholm, Sweden

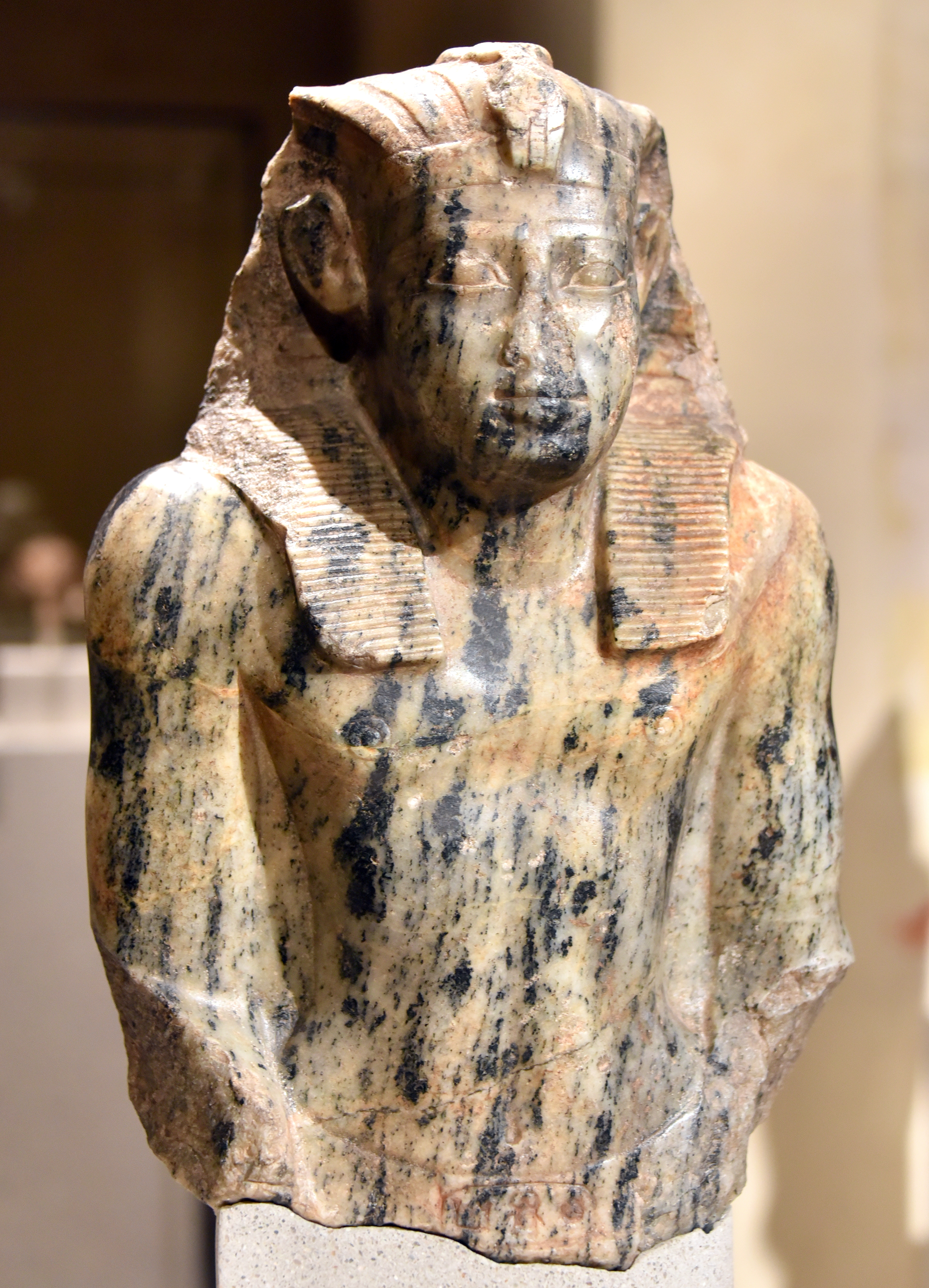
Upper part of a statue of Senusret I, from Egypt, Middle Kingdom, 12th Dynasty. c. 1950 BC. Neues Museum, Germany.

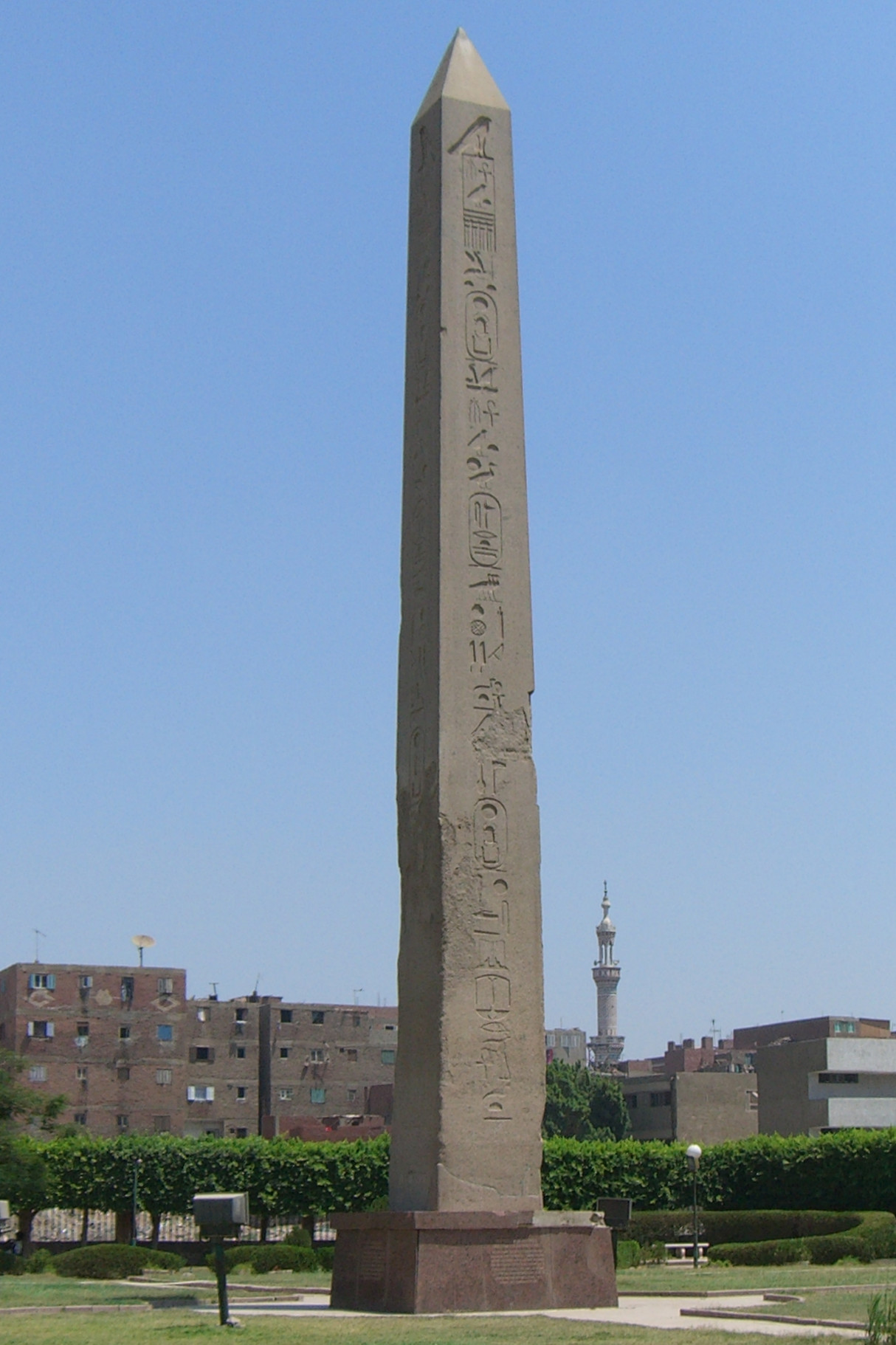
Obelisk of Senusret I in Heliopolis

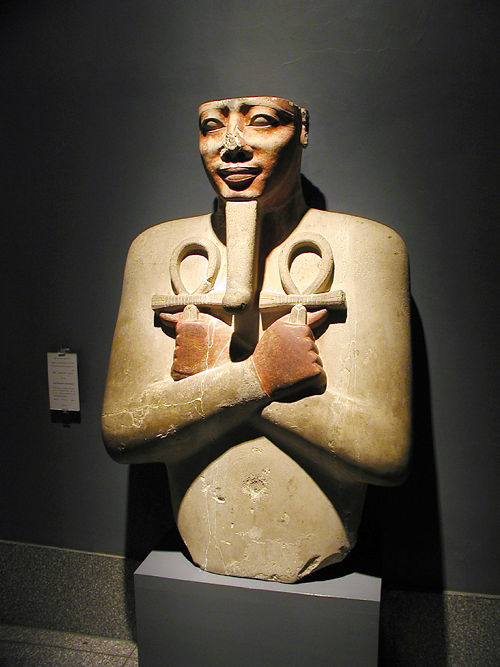
Osiride statue of Senusret I

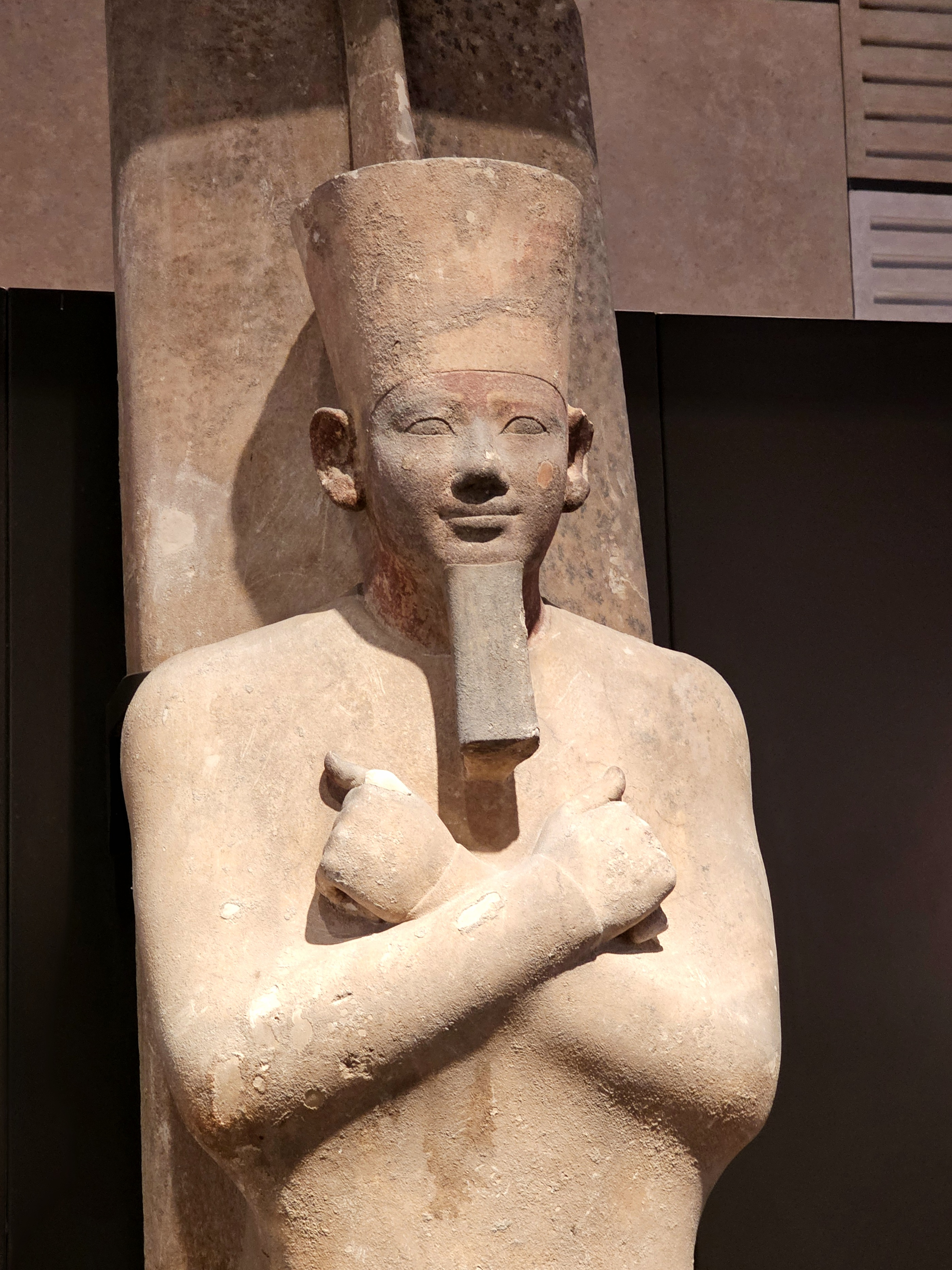
Osiride statue of Senusret I wearing the Deshret

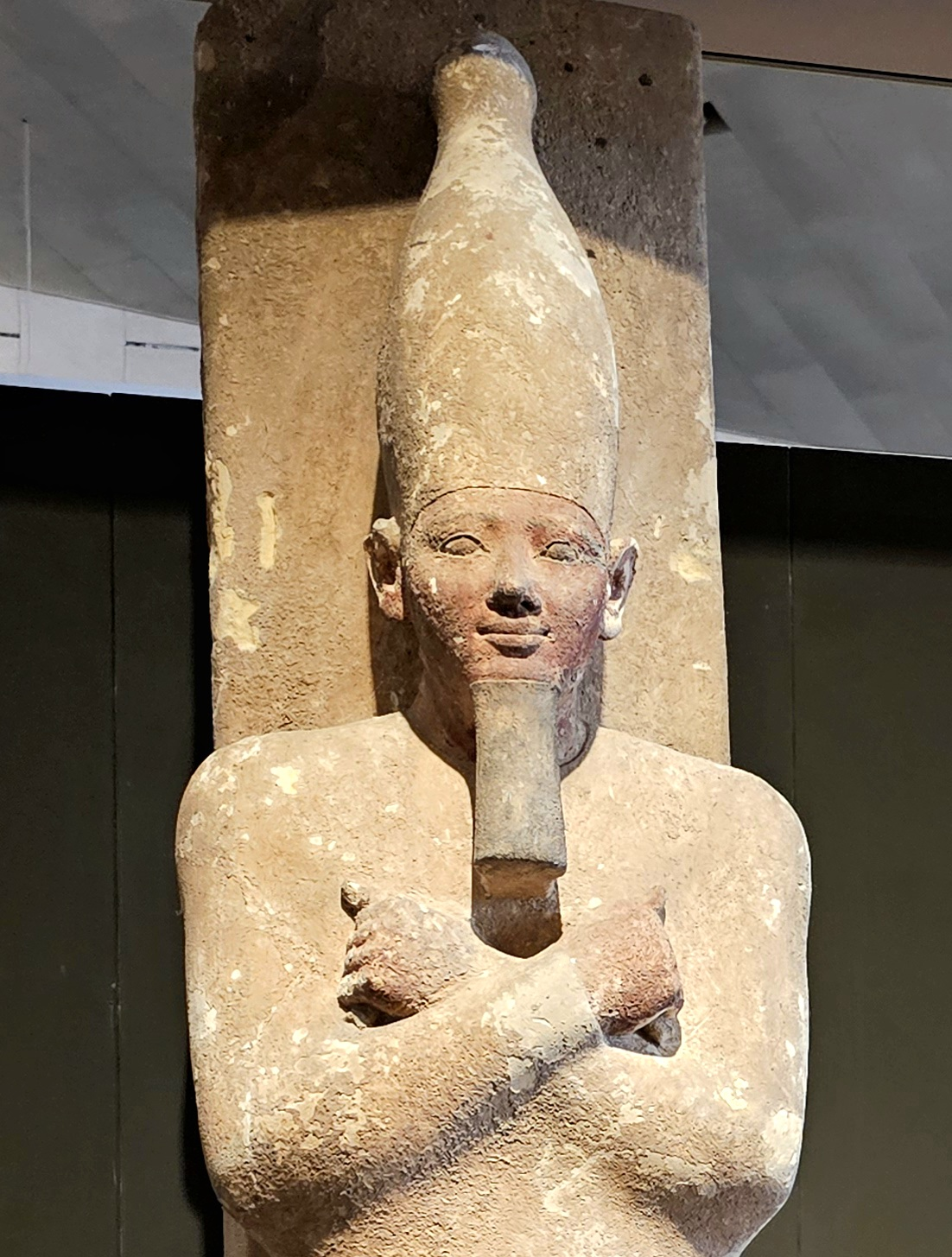
Osiride statue of Senusret I wearing the Hedjet

Stone weight with Senusret I's cartouche

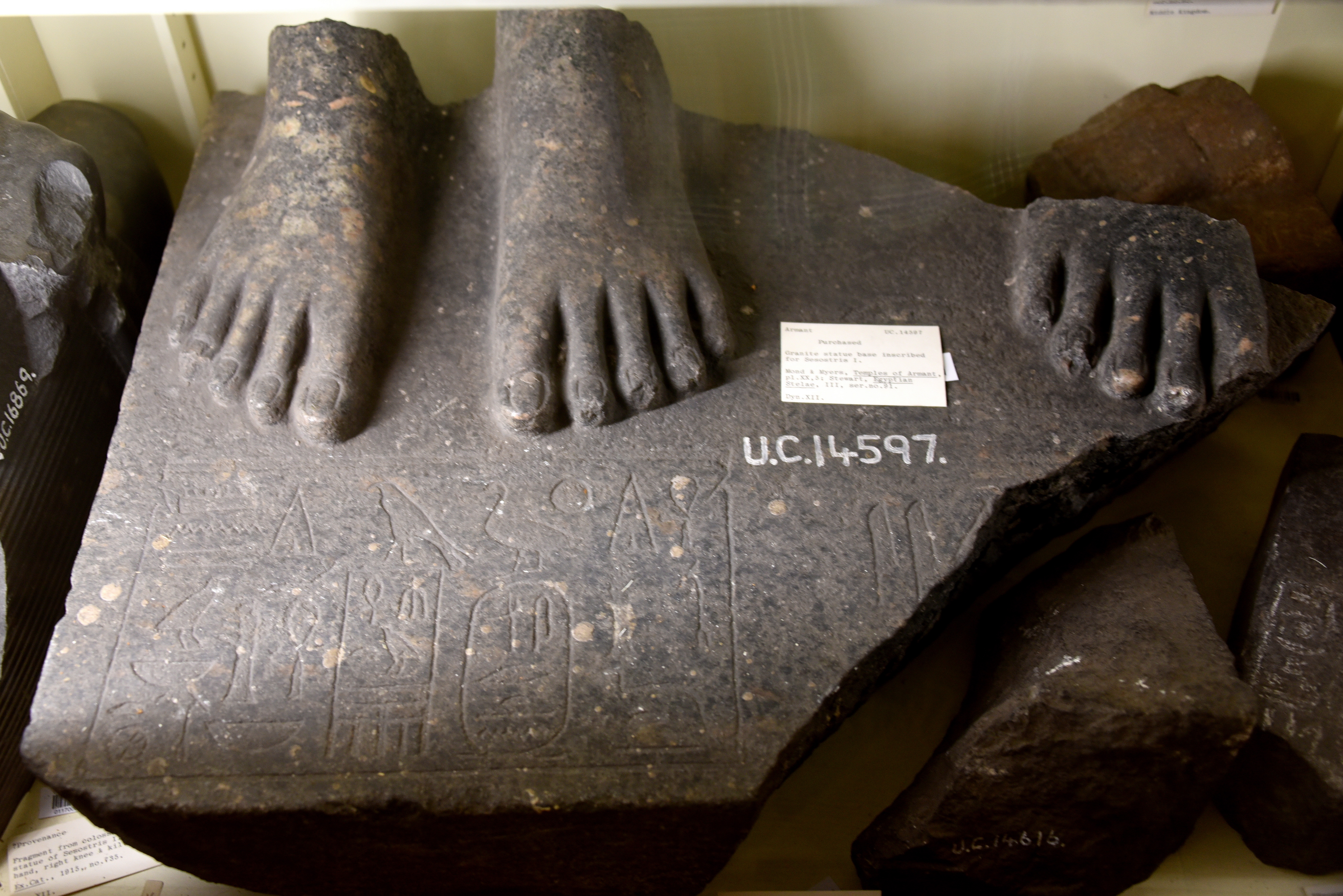
Base of a granite statue inscribed with the name of Senusret I. From Armant, Egypt. Petrie Museum, London.

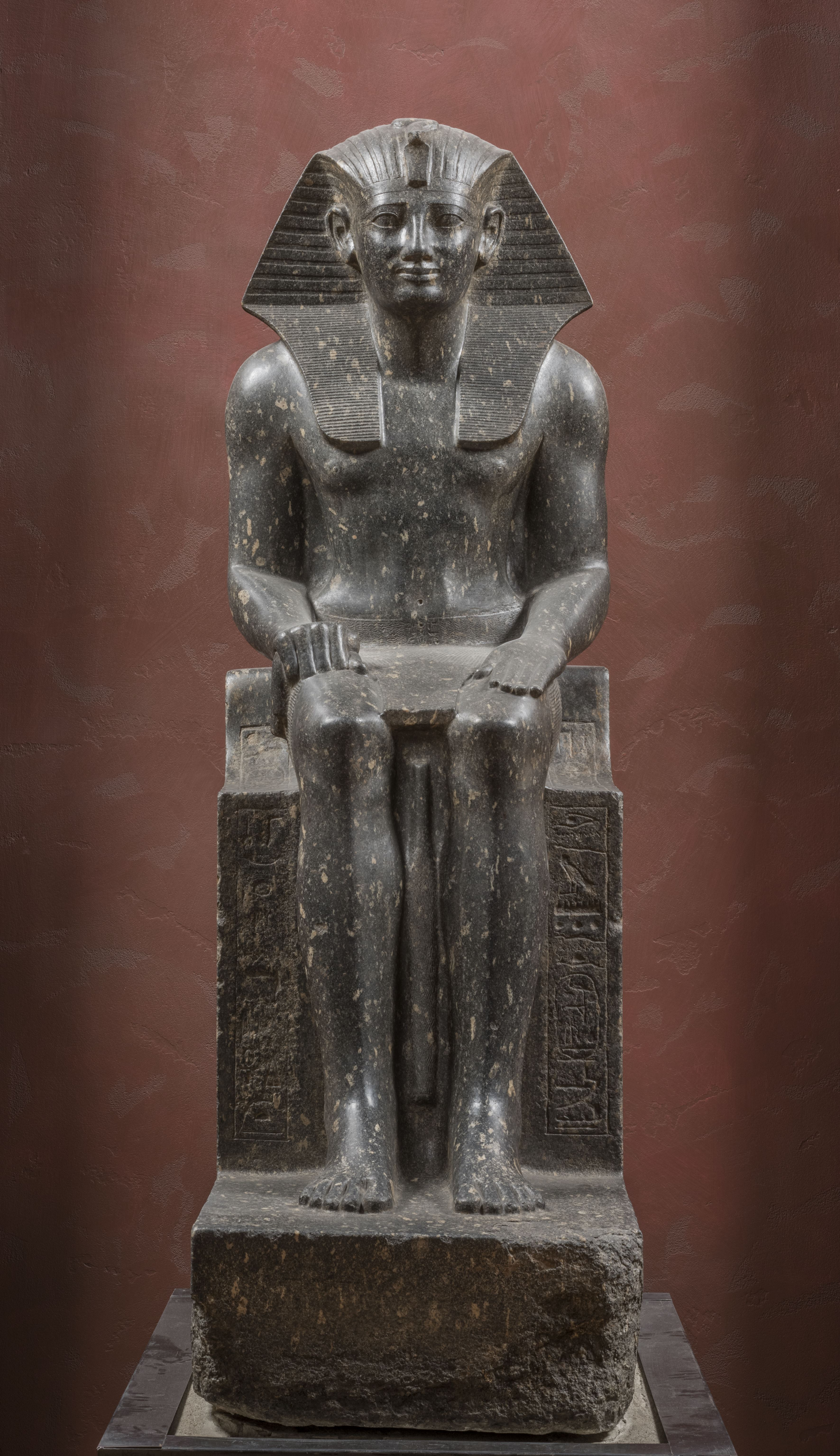
Statue of Senusret I that was recarved and reinscribed for Thutmose I. Museo Egizio, Turin (C 1374).

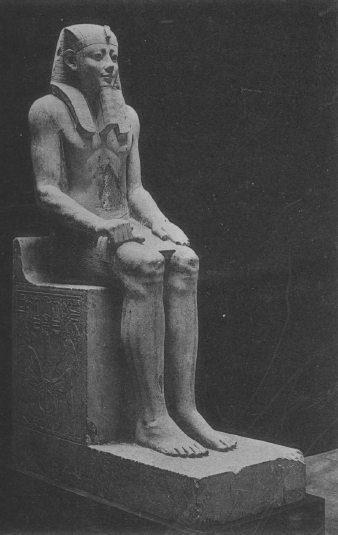
Intact statue of Senusret I from his pyramid complex at Lisht, now in the Egyptian Museum, Cairo (CG 411)

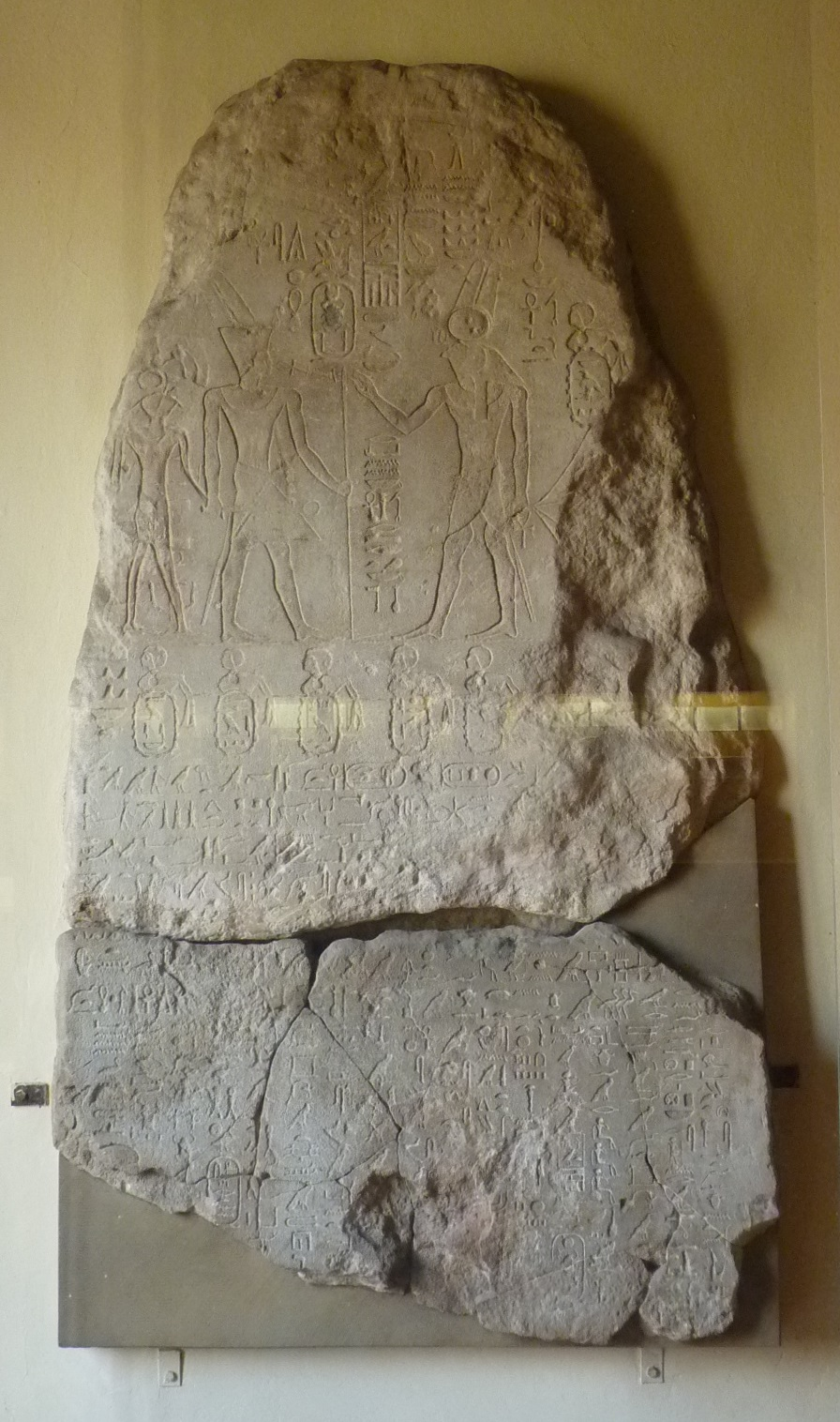
Stele commemorating the military campaign of Year 18 of Senusret I. National Archaeological Museum, Florence

== See also ==
- Instructions of Amenemhat
- Loyalist Teaching
