= Djefaihapi =

Ancient Egyptian nomarch

- Nomarch of the 13th nome of Upper Egypt
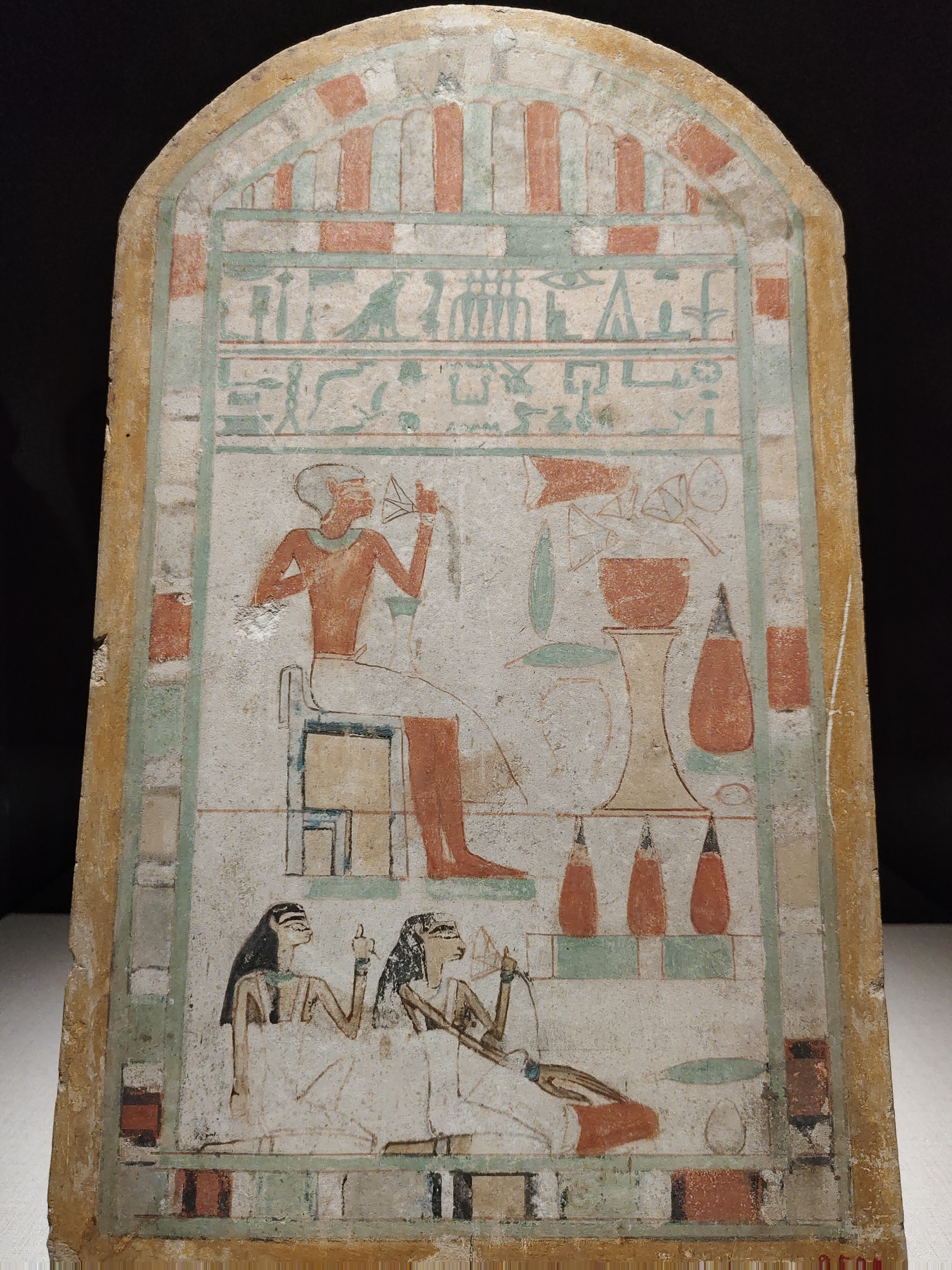
- Funerary Stele of Djefahapi
- Pharaoh: Senusret I
- Burial: Asyut (tomb no. 1)
- Spouse: Sennuwy
- Father: Idi-aat

Djefaihapi was an ancient Egyptian official during the reign of pharaoh Senusret I of the 12th Dynasty. In literature, his name is found written in many other variants such as Hepzefa, Hapidjefa, Hapdjefai, and Djefaihap.

== Career ==
Statue of Djefaihapi's wife Sennuwy (Boston, MFA 14.720)

Djefaihapi was a nomarch of the 13th nome of Upper Egypt, headquartered in Asyut, as well as a High Priest. He was the son of a man named Idi-aat, and his wife was lady Sennuwy. Djefaihapi is mainly known for his large rock-cut tomb at Asyut (no. 1) – which was a gift from king Senusret I himself – and its decorations. He was the first of a series of namesake nomarchs during the 12th Dynasty, and it is possible that the previous, apparently unrelated family of nomarchs at Asyut was replaced by Djefaihapi's one under Amenemhat I or Senusret I. It is known from his tomb that he ordered the rebuilding of the local temple of Wepwawet.

A preserved text from the tomb reports that the nomarch instructed a dedicated priest to perpetuate his funerary cult, rewarding him with land and goods. Djefaihapi was particularly careful in distinguishing between his personal properties and that derived from his administrative and priestly offices, and emphasized the fact that he used only the former ones to pay the priestly service.

In 1913, a Harvard University-Boston Museum of Fine Arts expedition discovered at Kerma in Nubia, a large burial mound with a tomb under it, surrounded by several smaller tombs ("Pan-graves"). Within the main tomb two large granodiorite statues of Djefaihapi and his wife Sennuwy were discovered. Evidence shown that the occupants of the satellite tombs were sacrificed altogether likely at the time of their lord's death, in a ritual long lost in Egypt but evidently still performed in Nubia. Initial claims that the owner of the main tomb was Djefaihapi have been largely superseded and is now generally believed that its owner was rather a Nubian tribal chief, and that the two statues were brought here at a later date, perhaps during the Second Intermediate Period. Djefaihapi's statue is shattered but Sennuwy's is well preserved, and both are exhibited nowadays in the Boston Museum of Fine Arts (MFA 14.724 and MFA 14.720).

Fragments of a statue of Djafaihapi was found at Tell Hizzin.

Recent excavations brought to light his daughter, Edi.
