= Sobeknakht (high steward) =

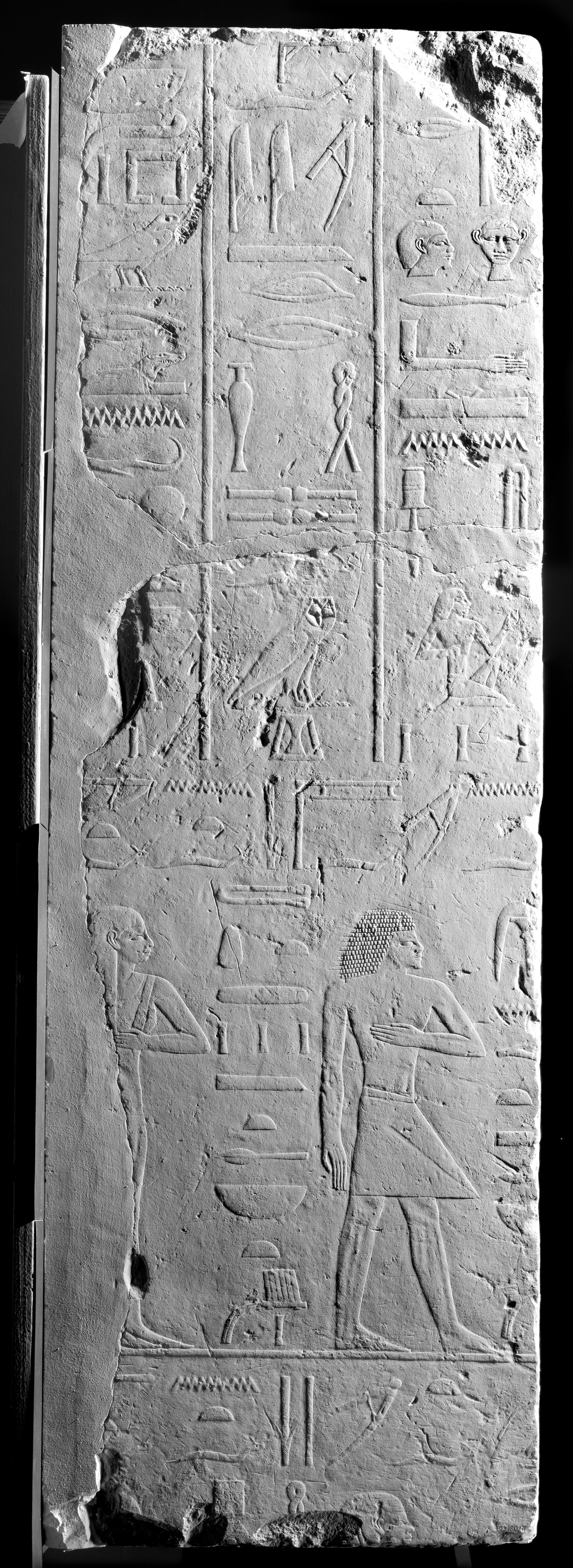
Relief from tomb of Sobeknakht

Sobeknakht (fl. c. 1975 BC) was an ancient Egyptian official with the main title high steward. He was in office in the Middle Kingdom under king Amenemhat I of the 12th Dynasty. Sobeknakht is known from a block with a relief, once adorning the chapel of his tomb at Lisht, close to the pyramid of Amenemhat I. Three other blocks with reliefs were found nearby and belonged once perhaps to the tomb of Sobeknakht too, although they do not mention his name. The tomb itself is not yet located. He is also known from a statue found at Thebes and perhaps from a stela, found at Abydos.
