= Neferitatjenen =

Egyptian queen

Queen consort of Egypt
- King: Mentuhotep II
- Spouse: Amenemhat I
- Issue: Senusret I, Neferu III

Neferitatjenen was a queen and "King's Mother" during the early 12th Dynasty in the Middle Kingdom of Egypt. She was the wife of Amenemhat I, founder of the 12th Dynasty, and the mother of Senusret I. The documentation of her relationships is preserved on a statuette depicting her son.

== Life ==
While specific dates of her birth, marriage, and death are not available, she lived during the 20th century BC.

The name Neferitatjenen (Nfr--it-Tȝ-ṯnn) is a compound Egyptian name that translates to "The Beauty of Itatjenen" or "Itatjenen is Beautiful." The element Nefer (nfr) means "beautiful," "good," or "perfect. Itatjenen refers to the god Tatenen (Tȝ-ṯnn), a Memphite chthonic deity whose name means "the risen land" or "the emerging earth", a reference to the primeval mound that rose from the waters of Nu at the beginning of creation. The prefix it- is interpreted as "father", making it "the Beauty of Father Tatenen" or "the Beauty of the Father of the Risen Land/Emerging Earth".

=== Family ===
The family origin of Neferitatjenen is uncertain. Her parents are not known.

Her husband Amenemhat I is only known to have had one wife and four children, making Neferitatjenen the likely mother of all four children. Senusret I married his sister Neferu III.

=== King's Wife ===
While the title is not explicitly attested, she would have served as "King's Wife" under Amenemhat I.

=== King's Mother ===
During the reign of Senusret I, she held the title "King's Mother" (mwt-niswt). Her son had a long reign, first shared a coregency with his father before he became sole ruler.

== See also ==
- Women in Ancient Egypt
