= Hor (high steward) =

Ancient Egyptian official

Hor depicted on a stela (Louvre, Louvre C2)

Hor (fl. c. 1950 BC) was an ancient Egyptian official who was in office under Senusret I. Hor is known from a number of monuments, most of them found at Abydos, where he most likely had a chapel. He is also known from a stela found in the Wadi el-Hudi. His most important title was high steward. Other titles include overseers of sealers and overseer of the gateway. In the function of high steward, he administered the royal domains. He bore the highest ranked titles, such as Iry-pat (member of the elite) or Haty-a. Only one of his monuments is dated (stela Louvre C2). The monument bears the year date 9 of Senusret's I reign, providing evidence that he was in office in the first part of that king's reign.
