= Story of Sinuhe =

Ancient Egyptian literary work

Sinuhe in hieroglyphs
zA Z1 n h t M1
zꜣ.nht
Za-nehet
Son of the sycamore

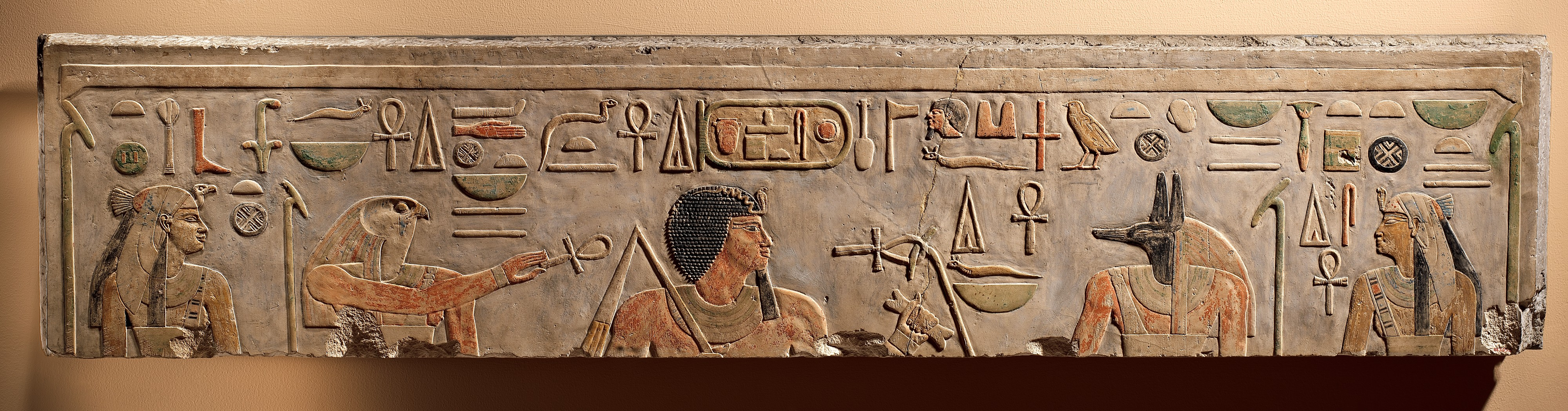
A raised-relief depiction of Amenemhat I accompanied by deities; the death of Amenemhat I is reported by his son Senusret I in the Story of Sinuhe.

The Story of Sinuhe, also referred to as the Story of Sanehat or Sanhath, is a work of ancient Egyptian literature. It was likely composed in the beginning of the Twelfth Dynasty after the death of Amenemhat I and the accession of Senusret I as sole pharaoh (i.e. some time after 1971 BC). The tale describes an Egyptian man who flees his kingdom, and lives as a foreigner before returning to Egypt shortly before his death. It explores universal themes such as divine providence and mercy. The oldest known copy of the text dates to the reign of Amenemhat III, around 1800 BC. The work was so popular within Egypt that newer copies have been found ranging up to 750 years after the original.

The story is known from significantly more primary sources than any other ancient Egyptian literary narrative – at least five papyri and 30 ostraca. Most other such narratives are known from one period, whereas Sinuhe spans the Middle Kingdom and New Kingdom.

== Summary ==
The Story of Sinuhe is written in verse and opens with a wording similarly stylized like other autobiographical coffin texts that are common in Middle Kingdom Egyptian tombs. Theoretically, the Story of Sinuhe would have been inscribed on his supposed tomb. The opening stanzas list Sinuhe’s accomplishments, titles, and ways he was of service to the royal family. Sinuhe claims to be, “...the True Acquaintance of the King, whom he loves, the follower, Sinuhe says, I was a follower who followed his lord, a servant of the royal chambers". Then it breaks away from this styling and transitions to Sinuhe receiving the news of the sudden death of the king from an assassination while he is on an expedition in Libya with the king’s oldest son. Upon hearing the news, Sinuhe is highly upset and enters a panicked state, “my heart staggered, my arms spread out; trembling fell on every limb. I removed myself, leaping, to look for a hiding place”.

Fearing that he might be falsely implicated in the conspiracy, Sinuhe flees away from Egypt, sneaks past guards, crosses the Lake Maaty and sets out for foreign lands. He travels beyond Egypt and eventually collapses due to dehydration, having a close brush with death. In the next scene he is rescued by a Syrian or Palestinian leader who recognized Sinuhe, “a leader of theirs, who had once been in Egypt, recognized me. Then he gave me water, he boiled milk for me”. Sinuhe is nursed back to health and eventually, after more travelling, meets Amunenshi, the ruler of upper Retjenu. He begins his new life and attempts to establish an identity amongst a culture he is unfamiliar with. Amunenshi entrusts him to command his armies, and it is through this command that Sinuhe becomes engaged in conflict with a challenger. Although Sinuhe is victorious in this conflict, it onsets a desperation for his homeland. At one point Sinuhe exclaims, “whatever god fated the flight—be gracious, and bring me home! Surely you will let me see the place where my heart still stays! What matters more than my being buried in the land where I was born?”.

Luckily for him, the new king, Senusret I, sends for Sinuhe to return to Egypt. Sinuhe is delighted and thus begins a lengthy correspondence between the King and Sinuhe. Sinuhe eventually writes to Senusret I, “Whether I am at home, whether I am in this place—it is you who veils this horizon of mine”. Eventually the King offers to allow Sinuhe to be buried in Egypt. Sinuhe returns to Egypt and also the royal court. There he is cleansed and restored in his Egyptian identity. The story closes with Sinuhe addressing the visitors of his tomb, and the tale returns to its original funerary text stylization.

== Sources ==
One of the oldest versions of this text was found by James Edward Quibell in an expedition to western Thebes in 1896. The excavation took place in several Middle Kingdom tombs found in the back of the Ramesseum. Here, Quibell found various fragments of papyri, later named the Ramesseum papyri. Many of these were of a medicinal subject matter, but literary texts have also been found, including the Story of Sinuhe. These fragments date back to the late 13th dynasty. Additionally, Quibell and his team also found a small chest, reed pens and several other items of interest. In a discussion about this archaeological expedition, author Alan Gardiner made note of the fragility and poor condition that the papyrus was found in; “if a fragment of the material were pressed slightly between the finger and thumb it disappeared in a mere dust". This copy of the Story of Sinuhe is written in hieratic. Gardiner used information from Quibell’s findings as well as a later ostracon to work on an English translation of the text. As the early ostracon and combined fragments from the Quibell expedition allowed for a more complete version of the tale. He published his work in translating the tale in 1916. Other authors have been able to build on his work and adjust their own translations as needed, one notable example being Aylward M. Blackman, who published his own notes in 1936 based on Gardiner’s work.

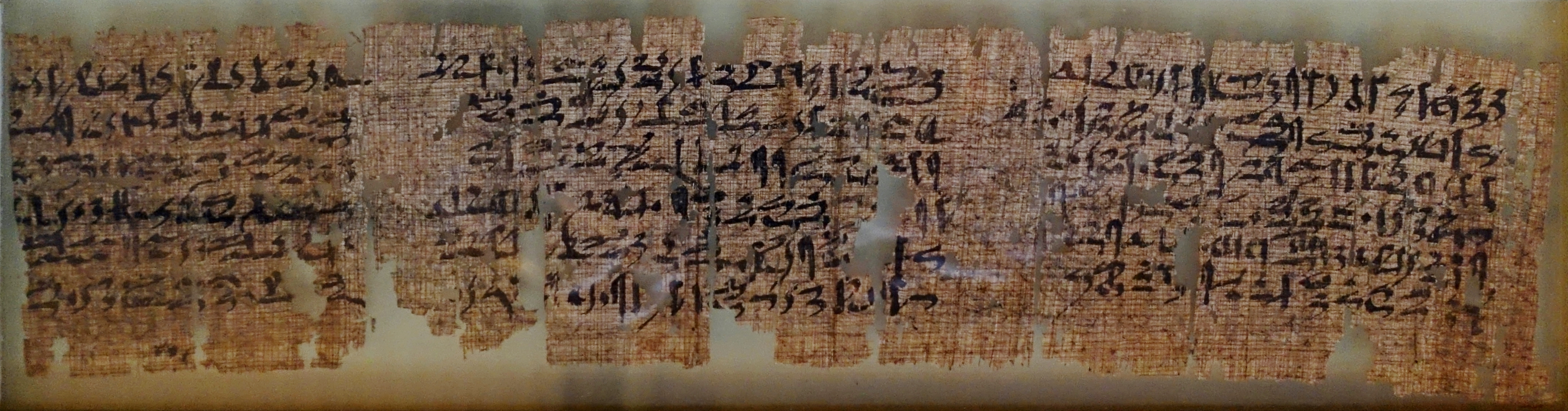
A papyrus found in the Ramesseum tomb

Many other versions of the text have been found. Including some fragments from a New Kingdom Ostracon, and a duplicate of the text discovered in the Museum of Natural History of Buenos Aires, as well as many more papyri. Most scholars on Egyptian literature agree that the large number of sources indicate that the Story of Sinuhe was popular and that many copies of it were made.

== Interpretations ==
The tale is notable for its age, as well as the popularity of the story in ancient history. It explores themes and morals that were a part of Egyptian ideals, such as order and chaos, or identity and the soul. Sinuhe also demonstrates the value that Egyptians placed on their homeland—as Sinuhe only finds peace through being allowed to be buried in Egypt. Most authors agree in their discussion on Sinuhe that he represents a dichotomy between a loyal Egyptian and a deserter. While the story mostly takes place in Sinuhe’s time outside of Egypt, this retelling of Sinuhe’s life outside of Egyptian lands serves to encourage “reflection on the nature of Egyptian life, particularly on an individual's relationship to the king”. To heighten the contrast, the story explicitly makes clear that the situation outside Egypt is idyllic. The province of Yaa where he resides in exile is a natural paradise of fertile vineyards; the prince marries Sinuhe to his eldest daughter; he is given his pick of the best lands as the chief heir-apparent. Nevertheless, Sinuhe abandons all of this worldly glory, his wife, and his children, so that he can be buried in Egypt. The grand funeral he is given there is a happy ending for the author; its worth is the greater.

The funerary autobiographical nature of the opening and closing of the tale is also significant. The traditional beginning in which the text is stylized as though it is written on Sinuhe’s tomb, listing his accomplishments and service to the royal family, is broken upon his fearful fleeing when the Pharaoh, Amenemhat I dies. The remaining stanzas of the story do not fit more traditional Egyptian narrative styles, at least until Sinuhe is able to return and be laid to rest in Egypt. This is a key narrative choice showing how Sinuhe is disconnected from traditional Egyptian culture once he departs from the safety and security of his homeland. Additionally, it is only when Sinuhe is sending his letters to the new king of Egypt, that examples of more traditional Egyptian stylization can be seen. Sinuhe praises the sender of the decree, King Senusret I, stating, “it is your spirit, Perfected God, Lord of the two lands, which is loved by the Sungod, and favored by Montu Lord of Thebes” he then goes on to list several gods in his praise. This form of writing is common in Middle Kingdom letters, and is another indication of Sinuhe only being able to experience Egyptian culture in direct connection to Egypt. In a similar vein, the name “Sinuhe” does not appear after the opening stanzas until after Sinuhe begins correspondence with the king again. Again showing Sinuhe’s disconnect from his heritage and identity upon his departure from Egypt. Another way of analyzing the narrative is that unlike most 'autobiographies' are written in some timeless fashion, however there is the underlying idea that Sinuhe desires to die within Egypt. Even if Sinuhe is alive at the end of the story, there's the underlying theme of wanting to reconnect with his culture directly, including dying within Egypt and receiving proper burial rites. As stated earlier, this is different from most autobiographies, most being written while they are alive, whereas with the Tale of Sinuhe, there is the implication of him passing on, perhaps most directly being stated within the Tale's final line: 'I was in the favours of the king's giving, until the day of landing came'(B 310 of Tale of Sinuhe).

Some interpretations have also been made about the name Sinuhe. Sinuhe is derived from the Egyptian phrase sA-nht or “Son of the Sycamore Tree”. In Egyptian myth the Sycamore or, Tree of Life, is associated with Hathor, a fertility goddess. Hathor being a goddess of fertility, there is possible interpretations for Sinuhe representing rebirth. Many homophones and etymologically related words to the term “sycomore”, nht, have to do with death, escape, and protection. Which are all common themes throughout the tale. Essentially, Sinuhe’s name serves as etymological foreshadowing for the ideals and events that take place throughout the story. Additionally upon his fleeing Sinuhe crosses a body of water, associated with Maat, while in the vicinity of a Sycamore tree. Further emphasizing their connection and perhaps illustrating Sinuhe’s fleeing of his own identity.

There have also been some different opinions on Sinuhe’s reasoning for fleeing after the death of the king. Some state that many of Sinuhe’s fearful traits indicate that he is somehow involved in the king’s death. This would mean that he flees out of a need for self-preservation, making a rash decision that lands him outside of Egypt for the majority of his remaining life. The more common school of thought, the “impulsive school” as titled by author Meltzer, simply reads that Sinuhe’s decision to flee was merely an impulse of fear due to the impending disorder upon the king’s demise. As the king’s death seems to shock Sinuhe, it is commonly inferred that he was murdered or assassinated. This seems likely considering that the king Amenemhat, who is likely the king in the story, was assassinated. Another interpretation of his departure is that it was an attempt to escape the rule and power of the monarchy. And that during all of the commotion of the king’s death, Sinuhe saw his chance to escape and fled.

Of course there are more interpretations of Sinuhe's flight from Egypt. Egyptologist John Baines notes one interpretation being in line with the general theme of homeland and connection to it, that being after the initial flight from Egypt, Sinuhe would be overcome by guilt in his abandonment of his people and homeland motivating him to move into exile for the majority rest of the story. It's further evident of how guilty Sinuhe felt when remembering how ancient Egyptian society is structured in such a way where order is extremely important and, as such, Sinuhe is willingly turning away from a culture that is not only intrinsically connected to him, but also potentially greatly chaotic relative to what he's used to. A second way to interpret the flight from Libya away from the prince is less about guilt and covers instead the concepts of grappling with internal morality. This meaning as opposed to Sinuhe discovering greater private morality or self fulfillment but rather instead Sinuhe was able to find salvation by re-identifying with the social role of that of an Egyptian. Connecting this back to his flight, perhaps the social role within Egyptian society became shaken when the old king died. With pharaohs in Egypt being considered semi divine beings, it can be no surprise that Sinuhe was both panicked and grieving upon learning the news of his king's death.

== Parallels ==
Parallels have been made between the biblical narrative of Joseph and the Story of Sinuhe. In what is seen as divine providence, Sinuhe the Egyptian flees to Syro-Canaan and becomes a member of the ruling elite, acquires a wife and family, before being reunited with his Egyptian family. Similarly, the Syro-Canaanite Joseph is taken to Egypt where he becomes part of the ruling elite, acquires a wife and family, before being reunited with his Syro-Canaanite family. Parallels have also been drawn from other biblical texts: the Hebrew prophet Jonah's frustrated flight from the orbit of God's power is likened to Sinuhe's similar flight from the King. The battle between David and Goliath is compared to Sinuhe's fight with a mighty challenger, whom he slays with a single blow, and the parable of the Prodigal Son is likened to Sinuhe's return home.

Additionally, the Story of Sinuhe inspired the modern novel Sinuhe the Egyptian (1945) by Mika Waltari and a film based on the novel.

== See also ==
- Conspiracies in ancient Egypt
- Instructions of Amenemhat
