= Amenemhat I =

Founding pharaoh of twelfth dynasty of Egypt

- Ammenemes I
- Statue of Amenemhat I

Pharaoh
- Reign: 29 years according to the Turin Canon but at least 30 years, (Note: The reason for the slight discrepancy on 29 and 30 years is the fact that the first Sed Festival for a pharaoh is usually celebrated to mark their 30th year on the throne. Both the Instructions of Amenemhat and the Story of Sinuhe state that Amenemhat was assassinated the night before he could celebrate his first Sed festival, therefore some later king lists only count 29 years because of this while others count 30 years out of respect.) in the 20th century BC. (Note: Proposed dates for the reign of Amenemhat I: c. 1994–1964 BC, c. 1991–1962 BC, c. 1985–1956, c. 1981–1952 BC, c. 1939–1910 BC, c. 1939/1938-1908 BC.)
- Predecessor: Mentuhotep IV
- Successor: Senusret I
Royal titulary
Horus name
sḥtp–ỉb-tꜣwy
Sehetep-ib-tawy
Horus, The one who has propitiated the mind of the Two Lands
G5	S29 R8 F34 N17 N17
wḥm-mswt
Wehem-mesut
Horus, The one who has repeated births
G5	F25 F31 X1 G43 S12
Nebty name
sḥtp–ỉb-tꜣwy
Sehetep-ib-tawy
The one who has propitiated the mind of the Two Lands
G16	S29 R8 F34 N17 N17
wḥm-mswt
Wehem-mesut
The one who has repeated births
G16	F25 F31 X1 G43 S12
Golden Horus
smꜣ
Sema
The uniter
G8	F36 G1 S12
wḥm-mswt
Wehem-mesut
The one who has repeated births
G8	F25 F31 G43 X1 S12
Prenomen
sḥtp–ỉb–rꜥ
Sehetep-ib-re
The one who has propitiated the mind of Re

M23 X1 L2 X1	N5 S29 R4 F34
Nomen
ỉmn-m-ḥꜣt
Imen-em-hat
Amun is at the forefront

G39 N5	M17 Y5 N35 G17 F4 X1
- Consort: Neferitatjenen
- Children: Senusret I, Neferu III, Neferusherit, Kayet
- Father: Senusret
- Mother: Nefret
- Burial: Pyramid at Lisht
- Dynasty: Twelfth Dynasty

See Amenemhat, for other individuals with this name.

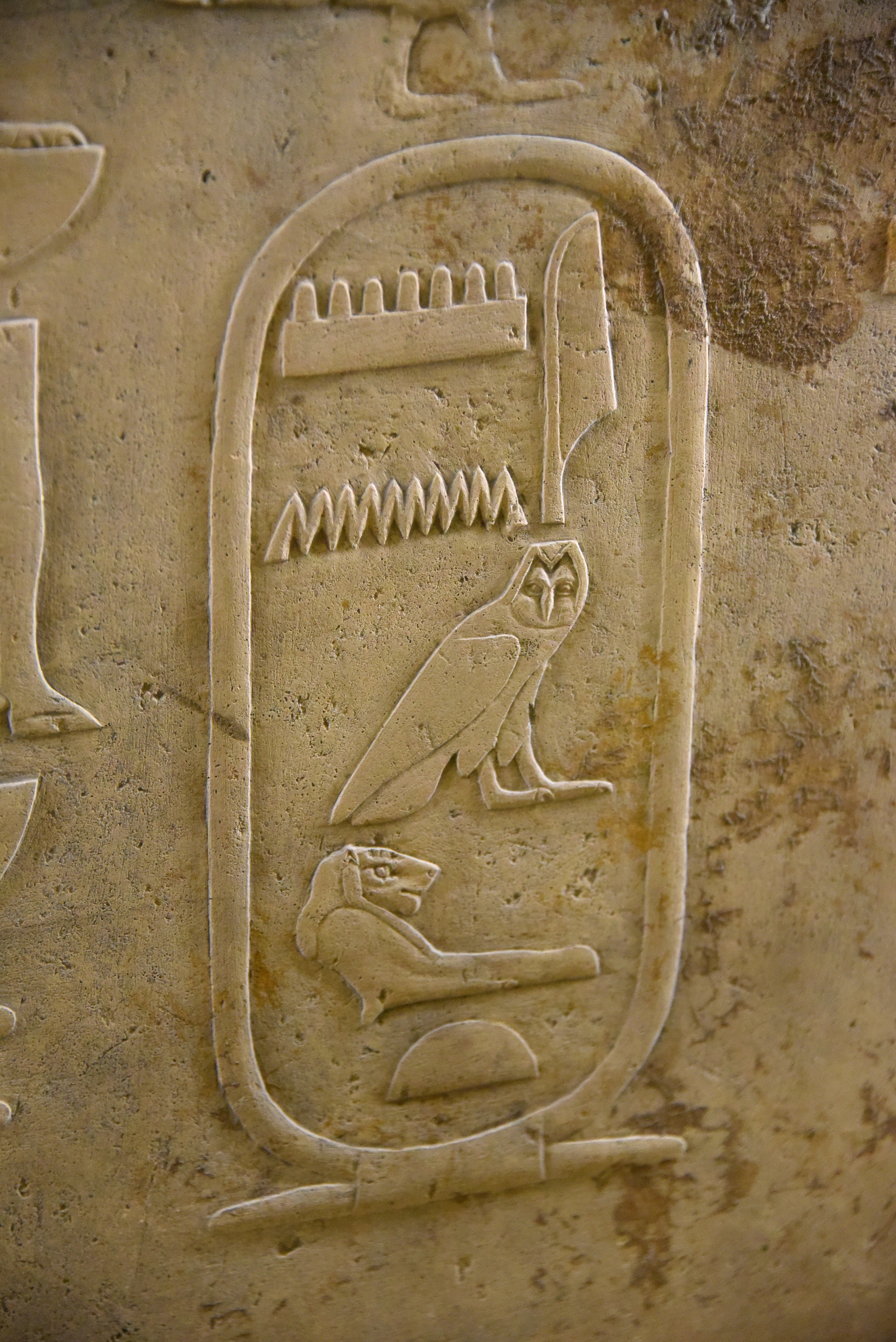
Cartouche of Amenemhat I's nomen, detail of a wall-block from Koptos

Amenemhat I (Ancient Egyptian: Ỉmn-m-ḥꜣt meaning 'Amun is at the forefront'), also known as Amenemhet I, was a pharaoh of ancient Egypt and the first king of the Twelfth Dynasty of the Middle Kingdom.

Amenemhat I was probably the same as the vizier named Amenemhat who led an expedition to Wadi Hammamat under his predecessor Mentuhotep IV, and possibly overthrew him from power. Scholars differ as to whether Mentuhotep IV was killed by Amenemhat I, but there is no independent evidence to suggest this and there may even have been a period of co-regency between their reigns.

Amenemhat I was not of royal lineage, born to Senusret and Nefert who were possibly related to the nomarchial family of Elephantine. The composition of some literary works (the Prophecy of Neferti, the Instructions of Amenemhat) and, in architecture, the reversion to the pyramid-style complexes of the 6th dynasty rulers are often considered to have been attempts at legitimizing his rule. Texts from the period mention his mother being from the Upper Egyptian nome Ta-Seti. Many scholars in recent years have argued that Amenemhat I's mother was of Nubian origin.

Amenemhat I moved the capital from Thebes to Itjtawy and was buried in Lisht. Both the Instructions of Amenemhat and the Story of Sinuhe suggest he was assassinated before he could celebrate his first Sed festival.

== Sources ==
Amenemhat I's praenomen Sehetep-ib-re occupies the first entry of the third row of the Karnak King List from the Festival Hall of Thutmose III and the fifty-ninth entry in the Abydos king list from the temple of Seti I. It must also have occupied the same position in the king list at the temple of Ramesses II, but is lost in a lacuna. It appears in the Saqqara Tablet from the tomb of the chief lector priest and chief of works Tjuneroy as the fifteenth entry. The Turin Canon partially preserves his praenomen in the twentieth line of the fifth column and accords him a reign of 29 years. The line immediately above the entry references the 'kings of the residence of Iti-tawy'.

Amenemhat I is also mentioned in Manetho's Aegyptiaca, originally composed circa the 3rd century BC and tentatively dated to the reign of Ptolemy II. The original work is no longer extant, but it has persisted through the writings of Josephus, Africanus, Eusebius, and George Syncellus. He is accorded a reign of 16 years under the name Άμμενέμης (romanized Ammenemês) by both Africanus and Eusebius, though he is placed at the end of the Eleventh Dynasty instead of at the start of the Twelfth Dynasty. Syncellus accords him a reign of 26 years under the name Σταμμενέμης ά (romanized Stammenemês I) as the thirty-second king of Thebes. (Note: Syncellus attributes his list to Apollodorus, who himself attributes it to Eratosthenes, who in turn attributes it to 'the scribes of Diospolis'; however, it is ultimately supposed to originate from none of these and was instead derived from an Egyptian king list.)

== Family ==
=== Origin ===
Amenemhat
- Vizier of Egypt
- Dynasty: Eleventh Dynasty
- Pharaoh: Mentuhotep IV

In the view of Egyptologist Frank J. Yurco,

"The XIIth Dynasty (1991–1786 B.C.E.) originated from the Aswan region. As expected, strong Nubian features and dark coloring are seen in their sculpture and relief work. This dynasty ranks as among the greatest, whose fame far outlived its actual tenure on the throne."

Amenemhat was the son of a Senusret and a Nefret, who were not of the royal family. His mother is attested to on an offering table that was found at Amenemhat I's pyramid at Lisht which also provides her title 'king's mother' and likely in the 'Prophecy of Neferty' in which she is identified as a woman from the Upper Egyptian nome of Ta-Seti. His father is attested to on a block from Karnak and held the title 'god's father'.

=== Relationship to Mentuhotep IV ===
The relationship between Amenemhat I and his predecessors, particularly Mentuhotep IV, remains unclear, although he may be identical to the vizier Amenemhat under Mentuhotep IV that is mentioned in inscriptions from Wadi Hammamat. The inscriptions here record two prophetic events: The birth of a gazelle calf on the stone which became Mentuhotep IV's sarcophagus lid, and a sudden rainstorm that revealed a well brimming with water. The Egyptologist Gae Callender notes that, presuming the vizier and king to be identical, the report of these miracles were intended to 'signal that he was the one for whom miracles were performed' and indicated that he 'had been favoured by the gods'. There is also an inscription on a bowl from Lisht bearing the names of both kings. It led the Egyptologist William Murnane to propose that a period of co-regency was instantiated to legitimize Amenemhat I's accession to the throne, though the Egyptologist Nicolas Grimal considers the posited co-regency to be fictitious. Instead, the Egyptologist Wolfram Grajetzki believes it to indicate the respect Amenemhat I had for his predecessor. There are indicators of possible unrest attested to in texts from Deir el-Bersha possibly dating to the period that led to Amenemhat I's reign. There were also two other claimants – an Inyotef and a Segerseni – that vied for the throne at this time.

=== Wife and children ===
Amenemhat I had one presumed wife, Neferitatjenen, who is known from a statuette of her son, presumed to be Senusret I. The statuette bore the inscription 'King Senusret born to King Amenemhat and born of the king's mother Neferitatjenen'. The statuette has since been lost, stolen from the Louvre in 1830. The name 'Neferitatjenen' is not otherwise known from the Middle Kingdom, leading Grajetzki to question the accuracy of the transcription, and furthermore it may refer instead to the mother of Senusret II whose father was Amenemhat II. Amenemhat I had one known son, his successor on the throne Senusret I. Three of his daughters are also known: Neferu III who is attested to in the Story of Sinuhe and was the wife of Senusret I; and Neferusherit and Kayet who are named on artifacts found in Amenemhat I's pyramid complex.

== Early reign ==
There is some evidence that the early reign of Amenemhat I was beset with political turmoil, as indicated by the inscriptions of Nehri, a local governor. There were some naval battles where an associate of Amenemhat I by the name of Khnumhotep I was involved, and helped to procure victory. Later, Khnumhotep was appointed as an important local governor at Beni Hasan, and he founded a dynasty of local governors there. His grandson was Khnumhotep III.

In the inscriptions by Khnumhotep, mention is also made of military campaigns against the Asiatics and the Nubians.

== Name ==
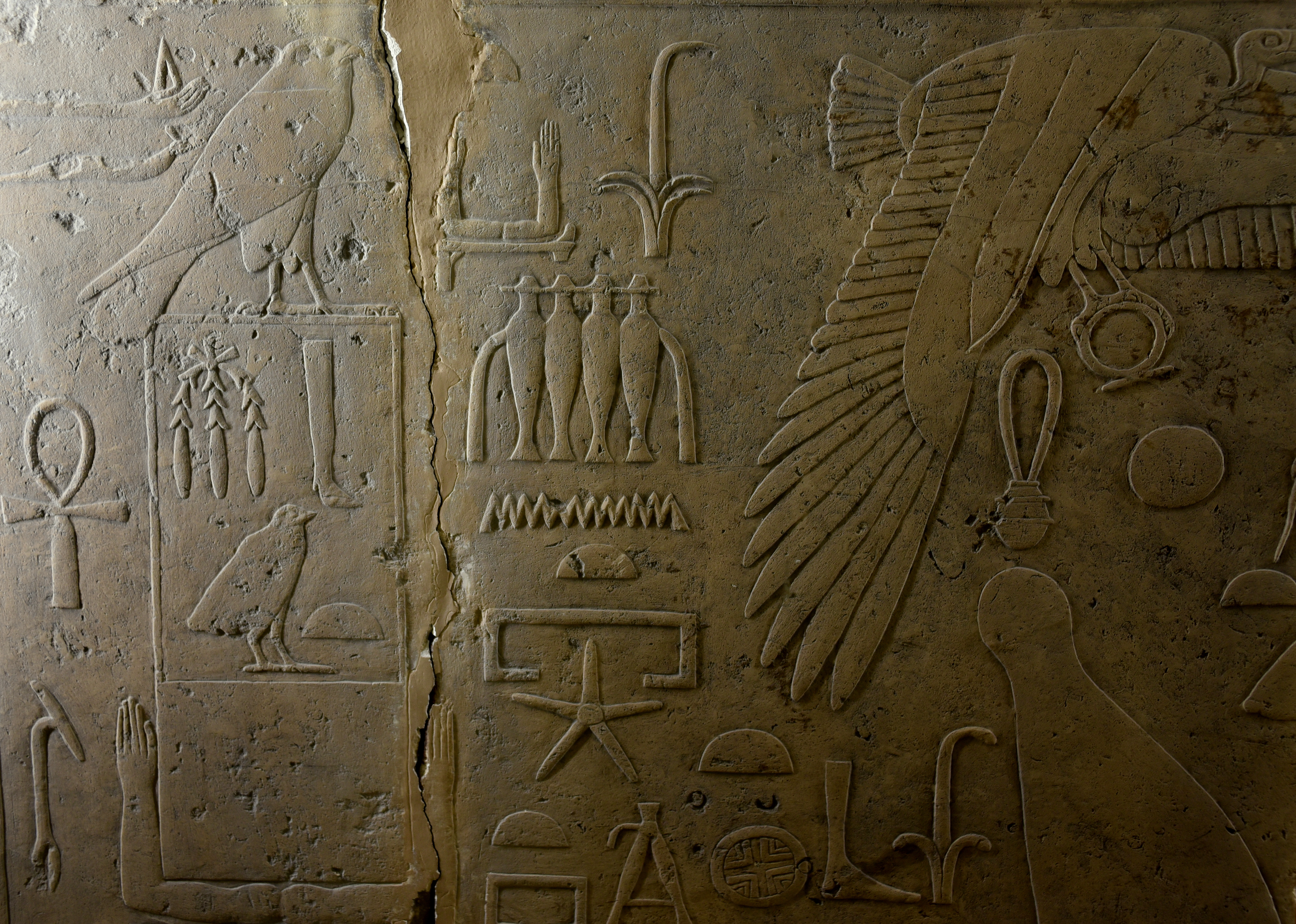
Serekh or Horus name of Amenemhat I, detail of a limestone wall-block from Koptos

Amenemhat I's name is associated with one of only two sebayt or ethical "teachings" attributed to Egyptian monarchs, entitled the Instructions of Amenemhat, though it is generally thought today that it was composed by a scribe at the behest of the king.

Amenemhat I's Horus name, Wehemmesu, which means renaissance or rebirth, is an allusion to the Old Kingdom period, whose cultural icons and models (such as pyramidal tombs and Old Kingdom artistic motifs) were emulated by the Twelfth Dynasty kings after the end of the First Intermediate Period. The cult of the king was also promoted during this period, which witnessed a steady return to a more centralized government.

== Pyramid ==
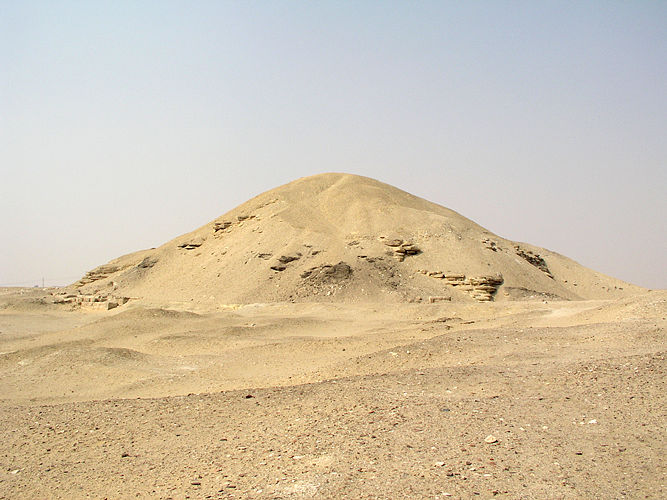
The ruined pyramid of Amenemhat I at Lisht

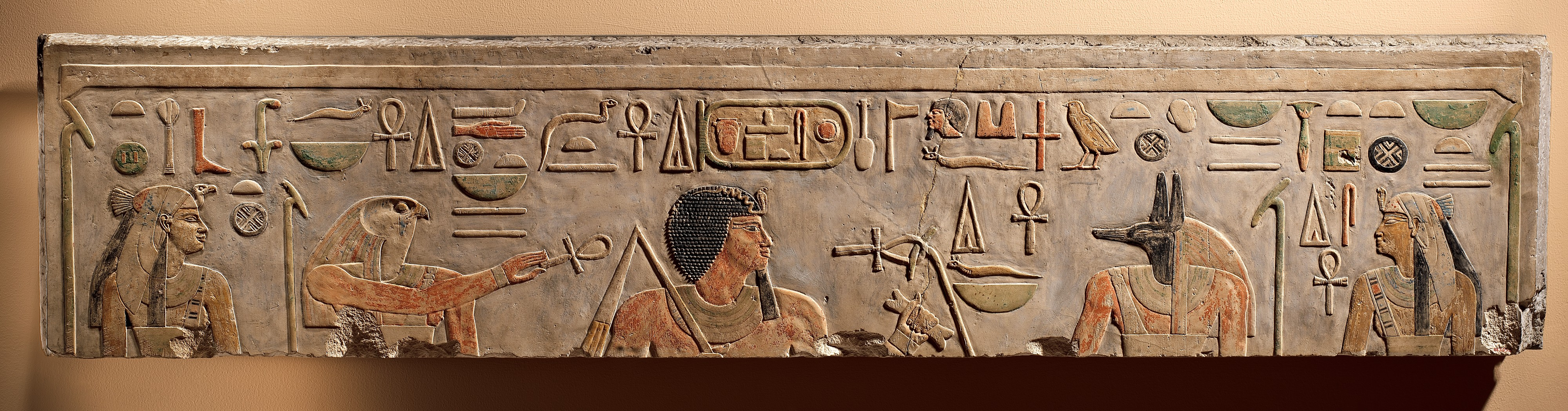
Lintel depicting Amenemhat I receiving blessings from Horus (left) and Anubis (right) from his pyramid complex at Lisht

Amenemhat I built his pyramid (Ancient Egyptian: Swt-ḫꜥu Ỉmn-m-hꜣt meaning 'Cult places of Amenemhat's appearance') at Lisht. The pyramid had a core constructed from roughly hewn limestone blocks with gaps plugged with sand, debris, and mudbrick. Curiously, the core also contained relief-decorated blocks pilfered from the monuments of the Old Kingdom. The core was then encased by fine limestone blocks. The pyramid had a base length of 84 m (276 ft; 160 cu) inclined at approximately 54°27' toward an apex either 55 m (180 ft; 105 cu) or 58 m (190 ft; 111 cu) high and had a volume of 129,360 m^{3} (4.568 million cu ft). As a result of the poor construction manner and the use of low-quality materials, coupled with the activity of grave robbers, the pyramid has now been reduced to a 20-metre-tall (66 ft) ruined mound. The decision to use inferior materials may have arisen from economic and practical considerations. In particular, Faiyum has abundant clay deposits which could be sourced.

Before the pyramid, on its east side, lay the mortuary temple that carried its own name independent of the pyramid. In the Old Kingdom, mortuary complexes were given a single name. Amenemhat I broke with this tradition instead choosing to provide names for the individual components. The temple was named 'High [rises up] Amenemhat's beauty'. The temple was built on a lower level than the pyramid – perhaps in reference to the terraced mortuary temple of Mentuhotep II – and was of a smaller size compared against Old Kingdom temples. There are few remains of the temple preventing a detailed reconstruction, and only its courtyard has been properly investigated. It appears that the temple was rebuilt during the reign of Senusret I, as attested to by inscriptions bearing his name. There is no evidence of a cult pyramid extant, though the causeway and valley temple – which has not been investigated and is now buried under a local cemetery – have been identified. Within its perimeter wall are the grave sites of family members and officials. These include his mother, Nefret; wife, Neferitatjenen; and a daughter, Neferu; along with a vizier, Intefiqer.

Beneath the pyramid, entered from the north chapel, is the substructure. The north chapel contained a red granite false door, behind which lay the descending corridor. The pink granite lined corridor plugged with blocks leads to a square chamber with a shaft in its centre that leads to the burial chamber. This chamber has filled with ground water and has never been accessed.

== Assassination ==
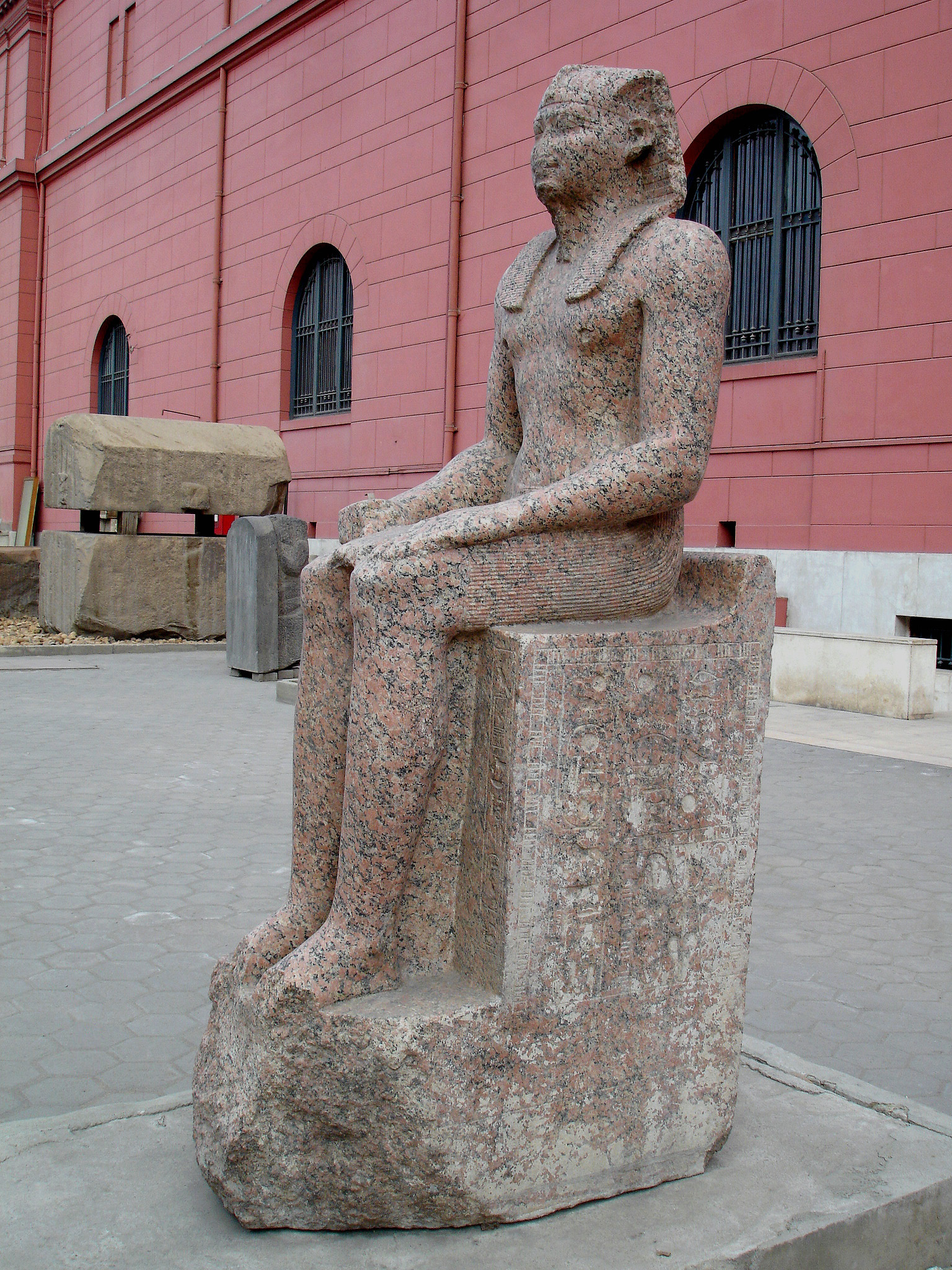
Statue of Amenemhat I in the garden of the Egyptian Museum

Two literary works dating from the end of the reign give a picture about Amenemhat I's death. The Instructions of Amenemhat were supposedly counsels that the deceased king gave to his son during a dream. In the passage where he warns Senusret I against too great intimacy with his subjects, he tells the story of his own death as a reinforcement:

It was after supper, when night had fallen, and I had spent an hour of happiness. I was asleep upon my bed, having become weary, and my heart had begun to follow sleep. When weapons of my counsel were wielded, I had become like a snake of the necropolis. As I came to, I awoke to fighting, and found that it was an attack of the bodyguard. If I had quickly taken weapons in my hand, I would have made the wretches retreat with a charge! But there is none mighty in the night, none who can fight alone; no success will come without a helper. Look, my injury happened while I was without you, when the entourage had not yet heard that I would hand over to you when I had not yet sat with you, that I might make counsels for you; for I did not plan it, I did not foresee it, and my heart had not taken thought of the negligence of servants.

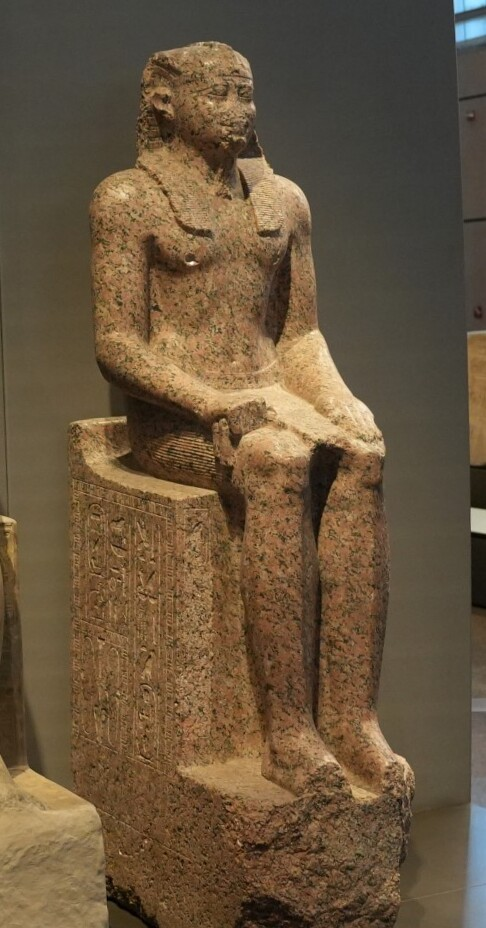
Statue of Amenemhat I in the Grand Egyptian Museum

This passage refers to a conspiracy in which Amenemhat was killed by his own guards, when his son and co-regent Senusret I was leading a campaign in Libya, likely to conduct raids that would fund the extravagant costs of the upcoming Sed festival. Another account of the following events is given in the Story of Sinuhe, a famous text of Egyptian literature:

Year 30, third month of the Inundation season, day 7, the god mounted to his horizon, the King of Upper and Lower Egypt Sehetepibre went aloft to heaven and became united with the sun's disk, the limb of the god being merged in him who made him; whilst the Residence was hushed, hearts were in mourning, the Great Gates were closed, the courtiers crouched, head on lap, and the nobles grieved. Now His Majesty had sent an army to the land of the Tjemeh (Libyans), his eldest son as the captain thereof, the god Senusret. He had been sent to smite the foreign countries, and to take prisoner the dwellers in the Tjehnu-land, and now indeed he was returning and had carried off living prisoners of the Tjehnu and all kinds of cattle limitless. And the Companions of the Palace sent to the western side to acquaint the king's son concerning the position that had arisen in the Royal Apartments, and the messengers found him upon the road, they reached him at time of night. Not a moment did he linger, the falcon flew off with his followers, not letting his army know. But the king's children who accompanied him in this army had been sent for and one of them had been summoned. (...)

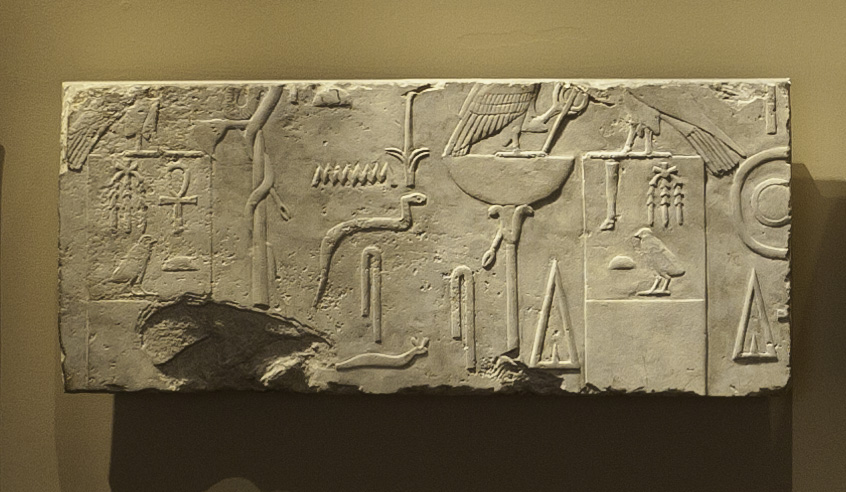
Relief block with the Horus names of Amenemhat I and Senwosret I MET

As Senusret was informed of the attack on his father by a messenger while still on campaign, he likely also learned that several of his brothers, present in the army, may have been involved in the conspiracy that lead to Amenemhat's assassination. Without alerting anyone, he returned hastily to the palace, leaving his forces behind, fearing he might also become a target. The exact means by which he regained control of the government or secured the throne remain unknown. It is historically attested that a civil war broke out shortly afterwards and that Senusret was forced to brutally suppress seditious forces aligned against him.

== Succession ==
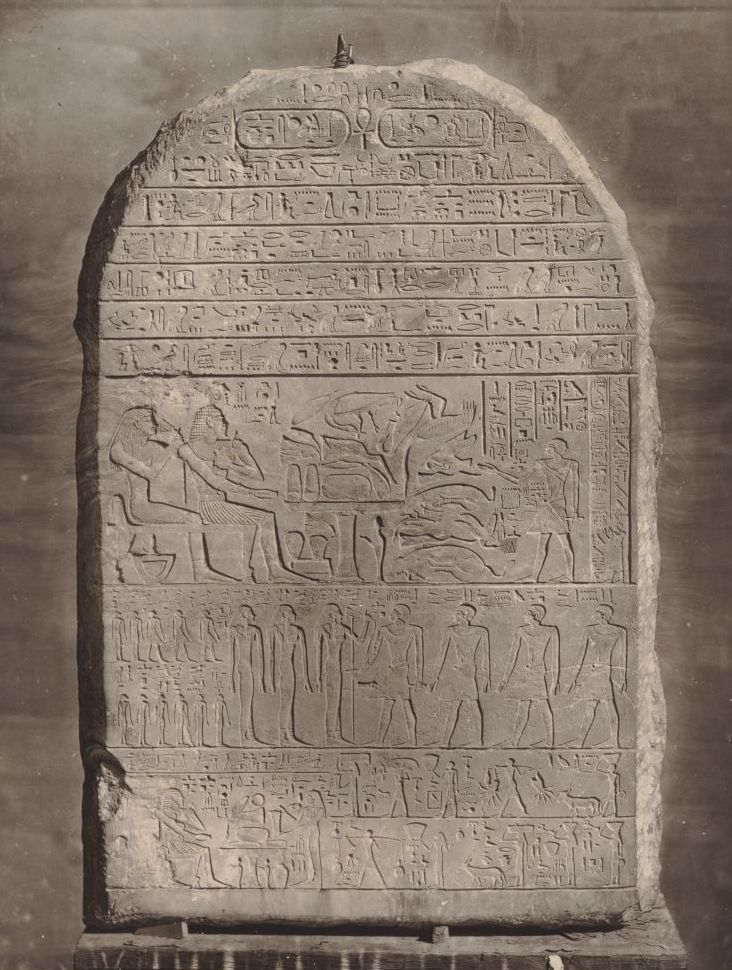
The double dated stela CG 20516

Amenemhat I is considered to be the first king of Egypt to have had a coregency with his son, Senusret I. A double dated stele from Abydos and now in the Cairo Museum (CG 20516) is dated to the Year 30 of Amenemhat I and to the Year 10 of Senusret I, which establishes that Senusret was made co-regent in Amenemhat's Year 20 with Senusret I celebrating his Year 1 as junior coregent (Horus), while his father Amenemhat I became senior coregent (Osiris).

== Officials ==
There are few known officials from Amenemhat I's reign. The vizier Ipi is presumed to have held office during the middle of Amenemhat I's reign. He is known from his tomb TT 315 / MMA 516 at Deir el-Bahri. He held many offices and titles during his lifetime including those of treasurer, steward, and seal-bearer for the king of Lower Egypt. A further vizier datable to the reign is Intefiqer.

Two treasurers can be placed under this king: another Ipi and Rehuerdjersen. Two high stewards, Meketre and Sobeknakht, have also been identified.

== Modern adaptation ==
Naguib Mahfouz, the Nobel Prize–winning Egyptian novelist, includes Amenemhat I in one of his stories published in 1941 entitled "Awdat Sinuhi" (Arabic: عودة سنوحي). The story appeared in an English translation by Raymond Stock in 2003 as "The Return of Sinuhe" in the collection of Mahfouz's short stories entitled Voices from the Other World. The story is based directly on the "Story of Sinuhe", although adding details of a lovers' triangle romance involving Amenemhat I and Sinuhe that does not appear in the original. Mahfouz also includes the pharaoh in his account of Egypt's rulers "Facing the Throne". In this work, the Nobel laureate has the Ancient Egyptian gods judge the country's rulers from Pharaoh Mena to President Anwar Sadat.

== See also ==
- Twelfth Dynasty of Egypt family tree
- List of Egyptian pyramids
- List of largest monoliths

== Bibliography ==
- Callender, Gae (2003). "The Middle Kingdom Renaissance (c. 2055–1650 BC)". In Shaw, Ian (ed.). The Oxford History of Ancient Egypt. Oxford: Oxford University Press. pp. 137–171. ISBN 978-0-19-815034-3.
- "Chambre des Ancêtres". Louvre. n.d.
- Clayton, Peter A. (1994). Chronicle of the Pharaohs. London: Thames & Hudson. ISBN 978-0-500-05074-3.
- Dodson, Aidan; Hilton, Dyan (2004). The Complete Royal Families of Ancient Egypt. London: Thames & Hudson. OCLC 602048312.
- "EA117". The British Museum. n.d.
- Franke, Detlef (2001). "Amenemhat I". In Redford, Donald B. (ed.). The Oxford Encyclopedia of Ancient Egypt, Volume 1. Oxford: Oxford University Press. pp. 68–69. ISBN 978-0-19-510234-5.
- Grajetzki, Wolfram (2006). The Middle Kingdom of Ancient Egypt: History, Archaeology and Society. London: Duckworth. ISBN 0-7156-3435-6.
- Grimal, Nicolas (1992). A History of Ancient Egypt. Translated by Ian Shaw. Oxford: Blackwell Publishing. ISBN 978-0-631-19396-8.
- Hornung, Erik; Krauss, Rolf; Warburton, David A. (2006). "The Editors: Royal Annals". In Hornung, Erik; Krauss, Rolf; Warburton, David (eds.). Ancient Egyptian Chronology. Leiden: Brill. pp. 19–25. ISBN 978-90-04-11385-5.
- Ilin-Tomich, Alexander (n.d.). "Persons and Names of the Middle Kingdom". Johannes Gutenberg Universität Mainz.
- Kitchen, Kenneth A. (1975). Ramesside Inscriptions: Historical and Biographical. Vol. 1. Oxford: Blackwell. ISBN 0-903563-08-8.
- Kitchen, Kenneth A. (1979). Ramesside Inscriptions: Historical and Biographical. Vol. 2. Oxford: Blackwell. OCLC 258591788.
- Kitchen, Kenneth A. (1980). Ramesside Inscriptions: Historical and Biographical. Vol. 3. Oxford: Blackwell. OCLC 254744548.
- Kitchen, Kenneth A. (2001). "King Lists". In Redford, Donald B. (ed.). The Oxford Encyclopedia of Ancient Egypt, Volume 2. Oxford: Oxford University Press. pp. 234–238. ISBN 978-0-19-510234-5.
- Krauss, Rolf; Warburton, David (2006). "Conclusions and Chronological Tables". In Hornung, Erik; Krauss, Rolf; Warburton, David (eds.). Ancient Egyptian Chronology. Leiden: Brill. pp. 473–498. ISBN 978-90-04-11385-5.
- Lehner, Mark (2008). The Complete Pyramids. New York: Thames & Hudson. ISBN 978-0-500-28547-3.
- Leprohon, Ronald J. (2013). The Great Name: Ancient Egyptian Royal Titulary. Writings from the ancient world. Vol. 33. Atlanta: Society of Biblical Literature. ISBN 978-1-58983-736-2.
- Morales, Antonio J. (n.d.). "Tomb of Ipi (TT 315)". Middle Kingdom Theban Project.
- Murnane, William (1977). Ancient Egyptian Coregencies. Studies in Ancient Oriental Civilization. Vol. 40. Chicago, IL: The Oriental Institute. OCLC 462126791.
- Oppenheim, Adela; Arnold, Dorothea; Arnold, Dieter; Yamamoto, Kumiko, eds. (2015). Ancient Egypt Transformed: the Middle Kingdom. New York: Metropolitan Museum of Art. ISBN 9781588395641.
- Redford, Donald B. (1986). Pharaonic King-lists, Annals, and Day-books. Society for the Study of Egyptian Antiquities 4. Mississauga: Benben Rubl. ISBN 0920168078.
- Redford, Donald B. (2001). "Manetho". In Redford, Donald B. (ed.). The Oxford Encyclopedia of Ancient Egypt, Volume 2. Oxford: Oxford University Press. pp. 336–337. ISBN 978-0-19-510234-5.
- Schneider, Thomas (2006). "The Relative Chronology of the Middle Kingdom and the Hyksos Period (Dyns. 12-17)". In Hornung, Erik; Krauss, Rolf; Warburton, David (eds.). Ancient Egyptian Chronology. Leiden: Brill. pp. 168–196. ISBN 978-90-04-11385-5.
- Shaw, Ian, ed. (2003). The Oxford History of Ancient Egypt. Oxford: Oxford University Press. ISBN 978-0-19-815034-3.
- Simpson, William Kelly (2001). "Twelfth Dynasty". In Redford, Donald B. (ed.). The Oxford Encyclopedia of Ancient Egypt, Volume 3. Oxford: Oxford University Press. pp. 453–457. ISBN 978-0-19-510234-5.
- Verner, Miroslav (2001). The Pyramids: The Mystery, Culture and Science of Egypt's Great Monuments. New York: Grove Press. ISBN 978-0-8021-1703-8.
- von Beckerath, Jürgen (1984). Handbuch der ägyptischen Königsnamen. München: Deutscher Kunstverlag. ISBN 9783422008328.
- Waddell, William Gillan (1964) [1940]. Page, Thomas Ethelbert; Capps, Edward; Rouse, William Henry Denham; Post, Levi Arnold; Warmington, Eric Herbert (eds.). Manetho with an English Translation. Cambridge, MA: Harvard University Press. OCLC 610359927.
