= Twelfth Dynasty of Egypt family tree =

Family tree of ancient Egyptian rulers

As with most ancient Egyptian royal dynasties, the family tree for the Twelfth Dynasty is complex and unclear.

Senusret	Neferet
Amenemhat I	Neferitatjenen
Senusret I	Neferu III
Amenemhat II	Senet
Amenemhatankh	Ita	Itawaret	Khenmet	Khenemetneferhedjet I	Neferet II	Senusret II
Neferthenut	Khnemetneferhedjet II	Senusret III	Meretseger	Sithathoriunet	Itakayt
Hetepti	Aat	Amenemhat III	Khenemetneferhedjet III	Sithathor	Menet	Senetsenebtysy	Meret
Amenemhat IV	Neferuptah	Sobekneferu	Hathorhotep
