= Ameny =

Ameny may refer to:

- An Egyptian pharaoh foretold in the Prophecy of Neferti, generally thought to be a short form of Amenemhat I of the 12th dynasty
- Amenemhat (BH2), Egyptian 12th-dynasty nomarch
- Ameny (general), Egyptian 12th-dynasty general
- Ameny (high steward), Egyptian 13th-dynasty high steward
- Ameny (vizier under Amenemhat II), Egyptian 12th-dynasty vizier
- Ameny (vizier under Amenemhat III), Egyptian 12th-dynasty vizier
- Ameny Antef, Egyptian 13th-dynasty pharaoh, full name Seankhibre Ameny Antef Amenemhet VI
- Ameny Qemau, Egyptian 13th-dynasty pharaoh
