= Keminub =

Ancient Egyptian queen

Keminub (fl. c. 1800 BC) was an ancient Egyptian queen with the title king's wife. She lived during the Late 12th Dynasty or Early 13th Dynasty of the Egyptian Middle Kingdom.

== Burial ==
=== Tomb ===
At Dahshur, the tomb of Keminub was next to the pyramid of Amenemhat II. For that reason, it has been suggested she was his wife. The tomb had been heavily plundered by robbers, leaving only fragments of the coffins, which allowed the archaeologists to identify the names and titles of the Keminub. The tomb is characterized by a long vaulted corridor, mud-brick walls, and a thoroughly looted burial chamber.

=== Coffin ===
The style of her coffin and burial is close to burials of the 13th dynasty. She may therefore have been a queen of this dynasty instead. The name of her husband is so far unknown. Keminub was buried together with a treasurer named Amenhotep, who is dated to the 13th Dynasty.

==== Book of the Dead ====
On the fragments of her coffin appears one of the earliest attestations of chapter 151 of the Book of the Dead.

== Literature ==
- Jacques Jean Marie de Morgan: Fouilles à Dahchour en 1894-1895, Wien 1903, p. 70, fig. 117
- Peter Janosi: Keminub - eine Gemahlin Amenemhets II.?, In: Zwischen den beiden Ewigkeiten, Festschrift Gertrud Thausing, Bietak, Manfred (Hrsg.), p. 94 - 101
- Keminub on Persons and Names of the Middle Kingdom and early New Kingdom
