= Nofret II =

Egyptian queen of the 12th dynasty

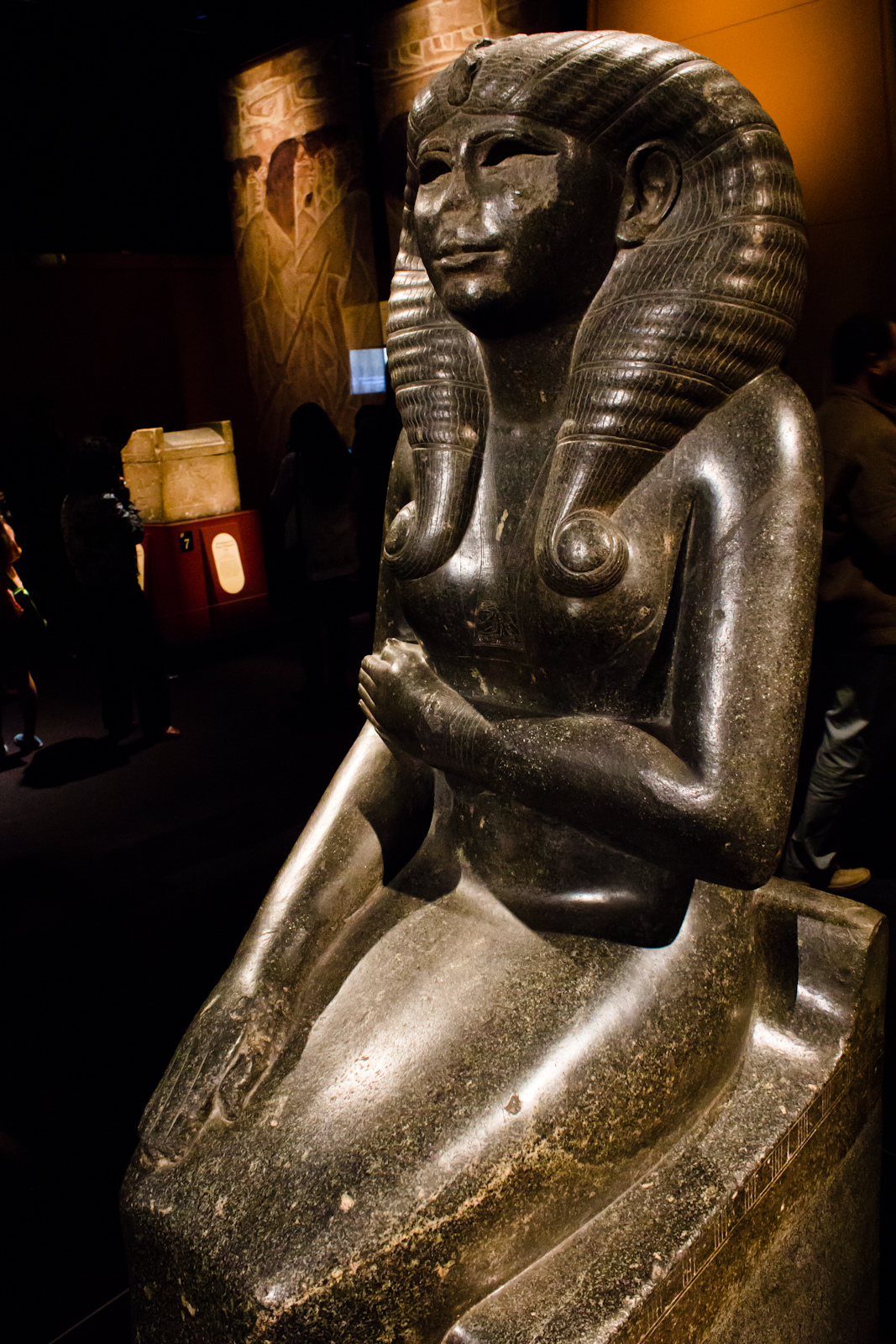
- Statue of Nofret II

Queen consort of Egypt
- King: Senusret II
- Spouse: Senusret II
- Dynasty: 12th Dynasty of Egypt
- Father: Amenemhat II

Nofret II (her name means Beautiful One) was an ancient Egyptian queen of the 12th dynasty. She was a daughter of Amenemhat II and wife of Senusret II.

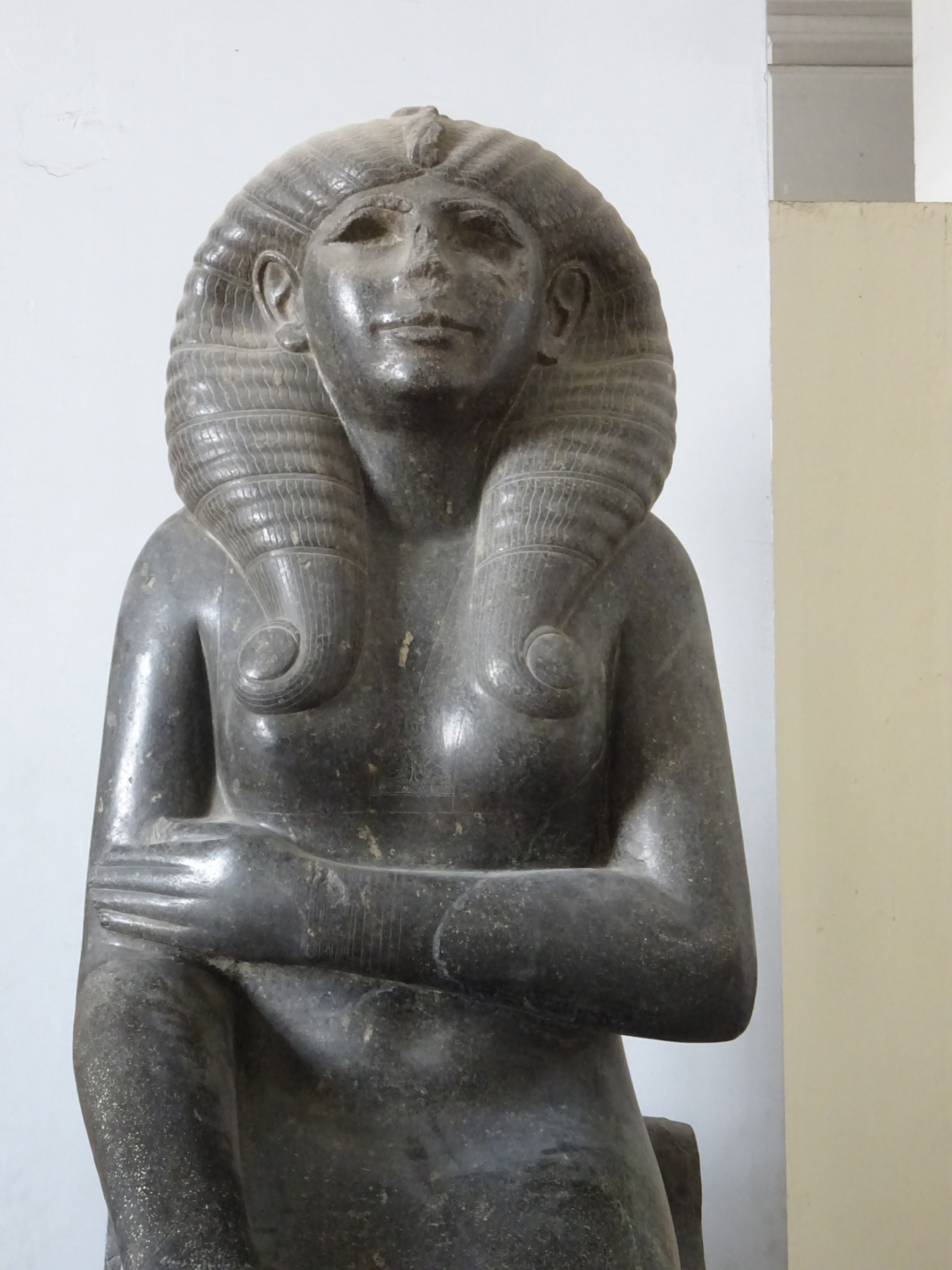
Nofret II, 12th dynasty, Cairo Museum

Along with Khenemetneferhedjet I she was one of the two known wives of Senusret II; his other two possible wives were Khenmet and Itaweret. All four were also Senusret's sisters. Two of her statues were found at Tanis and these are now in the Egyptian Museum in Cairo. The small pyramid in her husband's Kahun pyramid complex was probably built for her.

Her titles: King's Daughter; Great of Sceptre; Lady of the Two Lands.
