= Amenemhat II =

Pharaoh of Ancient Egypt

- Ammenemes
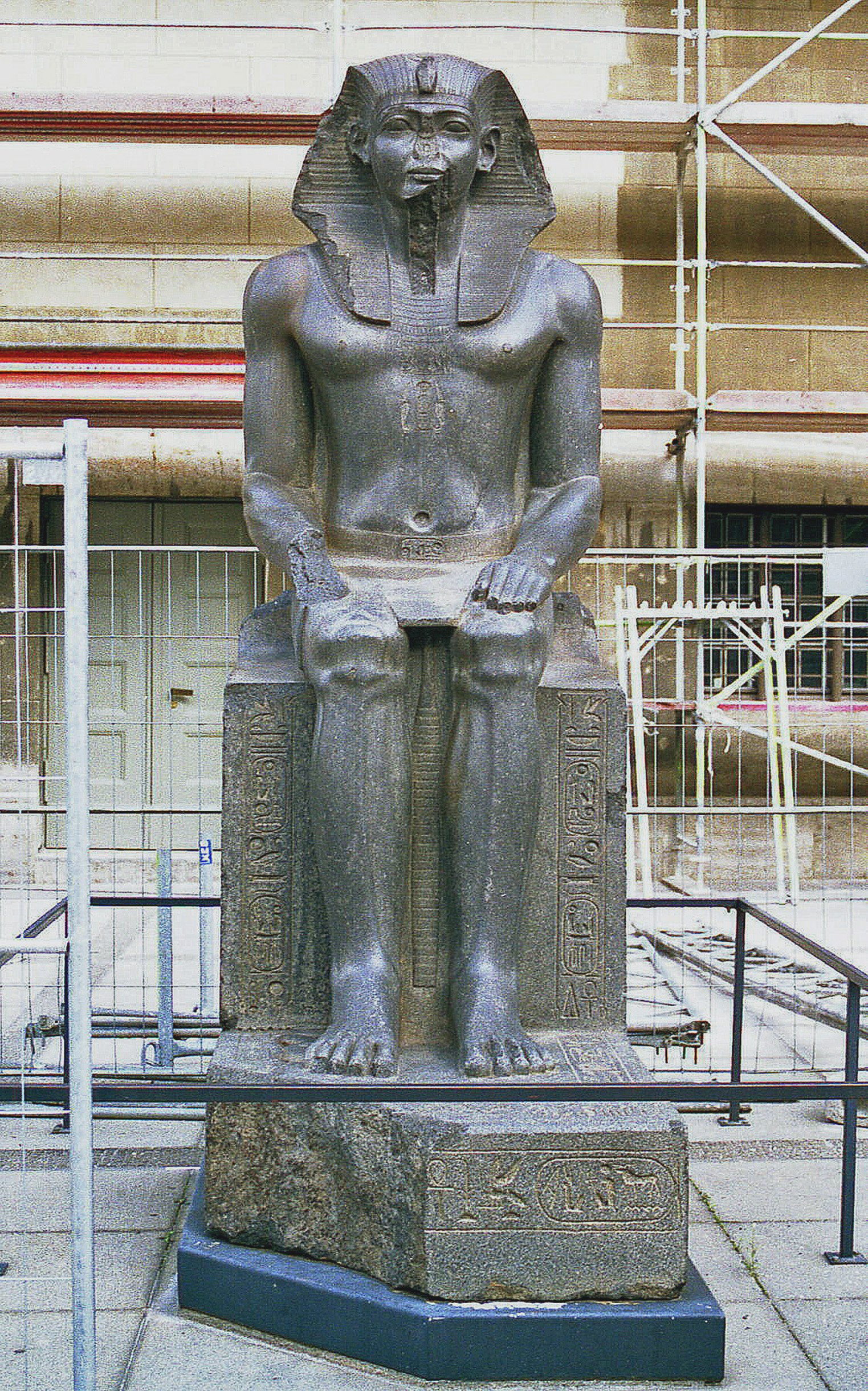
- Sitting statue attributed to Amenemhat II later usurped by 19th Dynasty kings Berlin, Pergamon Museum

Pharaoh
- Reign: 35 regnal years^{high. att.} c. 1926 – c. 1895 BC
- Predecessor: Senusret I
- Successor: Senusret II
Royal titulary
Horus name
Hekenemmaat
ḥkn-m-m3ˁ.t
Horus, He who delights in Maat
G5	H k n m mAat
Nebty name
Hekenemmaat
ḥkn-m-m3ˁ.t
He who delights in Maat
G16	H k n m mAat
Golden Horus
Maatkheru
(Bjk-nbw)-m3ˁ.t-ḫrw
The golden Horus, true of voice
G8 U2 Aa11 xrw
Variant form:
Maatkheruemnebtawy
(Bjk-nbw)-m3ˁ.t-ḫrw-m-nb-t3.w(j)
The golden Horus, true of voice as the lord of the two lands
G8 Aa11 P8 G17 V30 N19
Prenomen
Nubkaure
Nbw-k3w-Rˁ
Golden are the souls of Ra
M23 t L2 t < ra S12 D28 D28 D28 >
Nomen
Amenemhat
Jmn m ḥ3.t
Amun is in front
G39 N5 < i mn n m HAt t >
Variant form:
Ameni
Jmn-j
(Ruler of ?) Amun
< M17 Y5 N35 M17 M17 >
- Consort: Senet (uncertain)
- Children: Nofret, Khenmet? and Khenemetneferhedjet
- Father: Senusret I
- Mother: Neferu III
- Died: c. 1895 BC
- Burial: White Pyramid, Dahshur, Egypt
- Dynasty: 12th Dynasty

Amenemhat II, also known as Amenemhet II, (died c. 1895 BC), was the third king of the 12th Dynasty during the Middle Kingdom of Egypt. Amenemhat II ruled for approximately 35 years, but his reign and family relationships remain relatively obscure.

== Family ==
=== Parentage ===
Amenemhat II was the son of Senusret I. He was born to Neferu III, daughter of Amenemhat I. Consequently, Neferu III was the sister-wife of Senusret I, son of Amenemhat I. She is mentioned in the Story of Sinuhe as the wife of Senusret I, as well as on monuments of her father and monuments of her son.

=== Sisters ===
Amenemhat II is known to have had two sisters: Sebat and Itakayet . Both of these women were buried at Lisht near the pyramid of Senusret I.

=== Spouses ===
The identities of Amenemhat II's spouses are unknown. The following women might be spouses to him.

- Senet held the titles "King's Wife" and "King's Mother". Her husband and son are not known, and she has been suggested as a candidate for the wife of Amenemhat II. The titles "King's Daughter" and "King's Sister" are not attested, indicating she was not of the immediate royal family (royal blood) and sister-wife. She is only known from statues, not a tomb within the burial complex of Amenemhat II.
- Keminub was a "King's Wife" buried within the pyramid complex of Amenemhat II. Due to the proximity of the tomb she was initially thought to be a wife of Amenemhat II, but is now thought to have been buried in the 13th Dynasty.

=== Children with unknown spouse(s) ===
- Senusret II: The son and successor (legal heir) of Amenemhat II. In patrilineal succession, ideally, he would be the first born son of a first rank wife. However, the father-son relationship for him is never explicitly stated anywhere.
- Nofret
- Khenemetneferhedjet: likely the same person as Khenemetneferhedjet I

=== Possible children ===
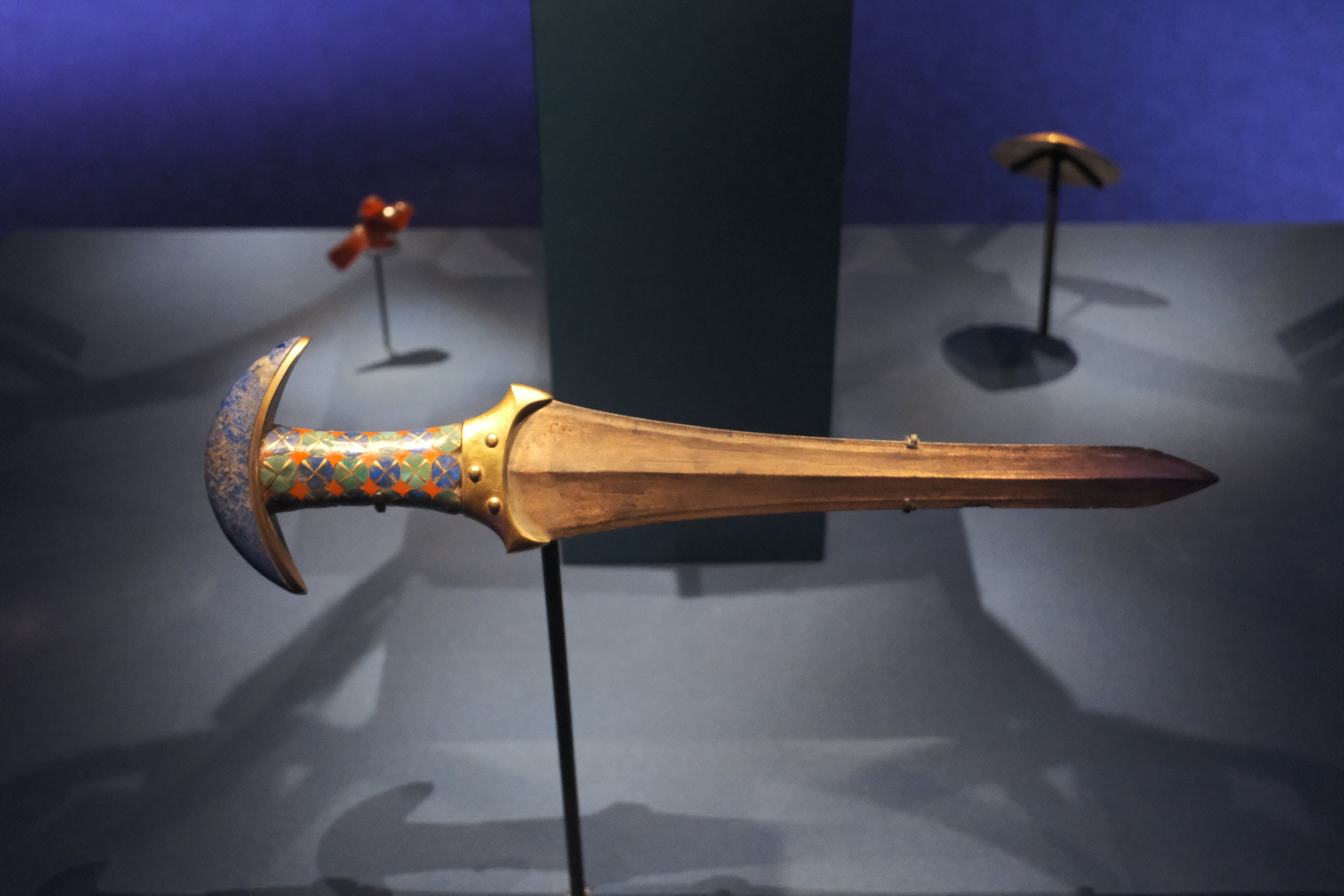
Dagger of Princess Ita, who was likely Amenemhat II's daughter

Several royal women were buried within his pyramid complex, but their relationships with the king are unclear. Three women identified as "king's daughters", Ita, Itaweret, and Khenmet were buried in his pyramid and may have been Amenemhat II's daughters. Conclusive proof is still lacking. Scientific examination of the skeletal remains of the women is providing more details.

- Ita: likely daughter of the king
- Itaweret: likely daughter of the king
- Khenmet: likely daughter of the king
- Amenemhatankh: was either his son or perhaps, his brother

== Early life ==
An early attestation of Amenemhat II may have come from the tomb of the namesake nomarch Amenemhat, buried at Beni Hasan. This nomarch, who lived under Senusret I, escorted the "King's son Ameny" in an expedition to Nubia, and it is believed that this prince Ameny was none other than Amenemhat II in his youth.

== Reign ==
When Amenemhat II became king he took the prenomen Nubkaure, which is the name mostly found on private monuments.

=== Accession ===
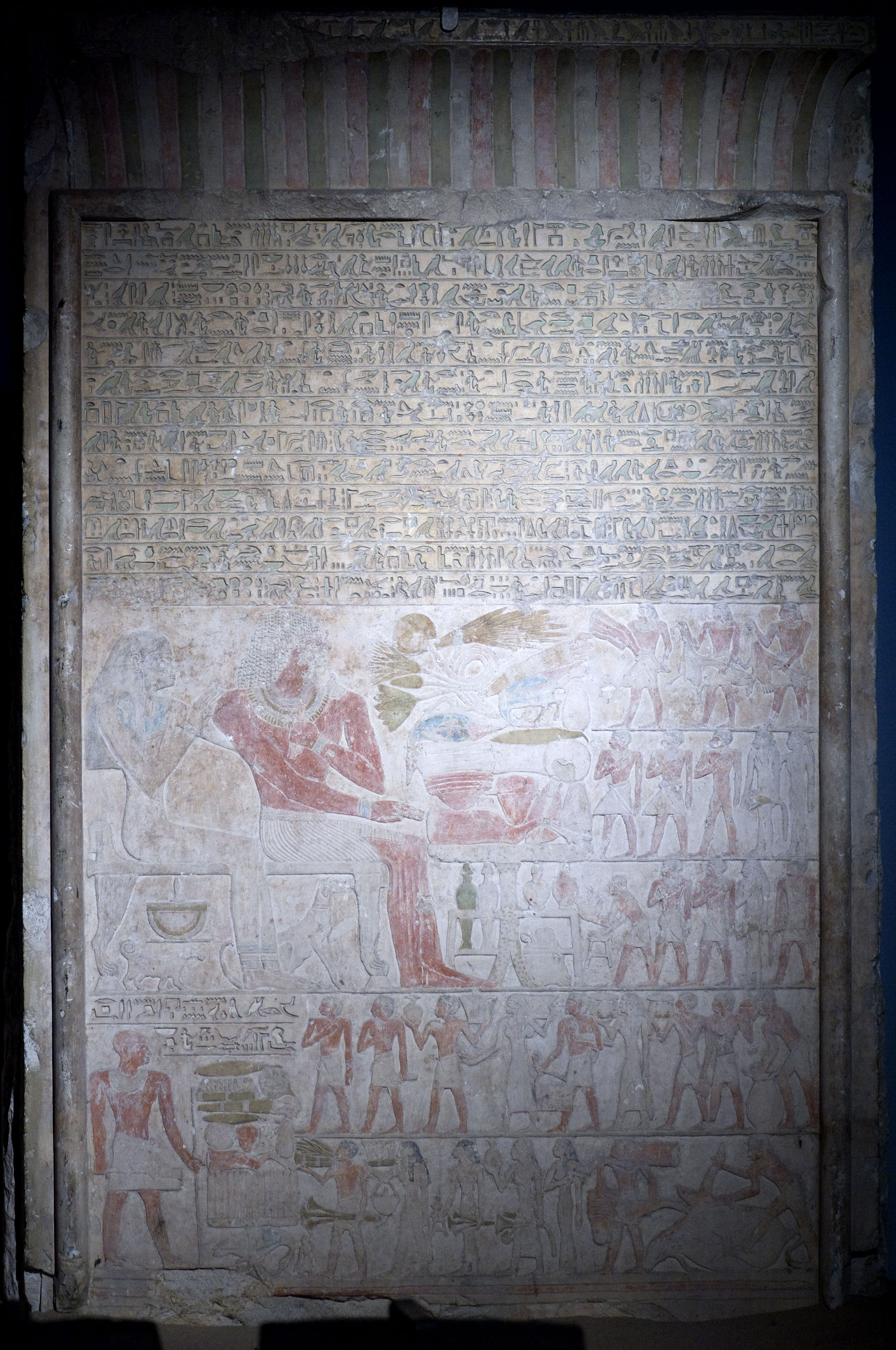
Wepwawet-aa on this stela may refer to Amenemhat II before being king

The double-dated stela of an official named Wepwawet-aa (Leiden, V4), dated to regnal Year 44 of Senusret I and regnal Year 2 of Amenemhat II, sometimes has been interpreted as evidence of a coregency. If so, he would have been appointed junior coregent on I Akhet Day 1 (New Year) in Year 43 of Senusret I, starting immediately on his Year 1. Other researchers regard a coregency as unlikely and interpret the double date on the stela as a time range during which Wepwawet-aa held office, from Senusret I's Year 44 to Amenemhat II's Year 2.

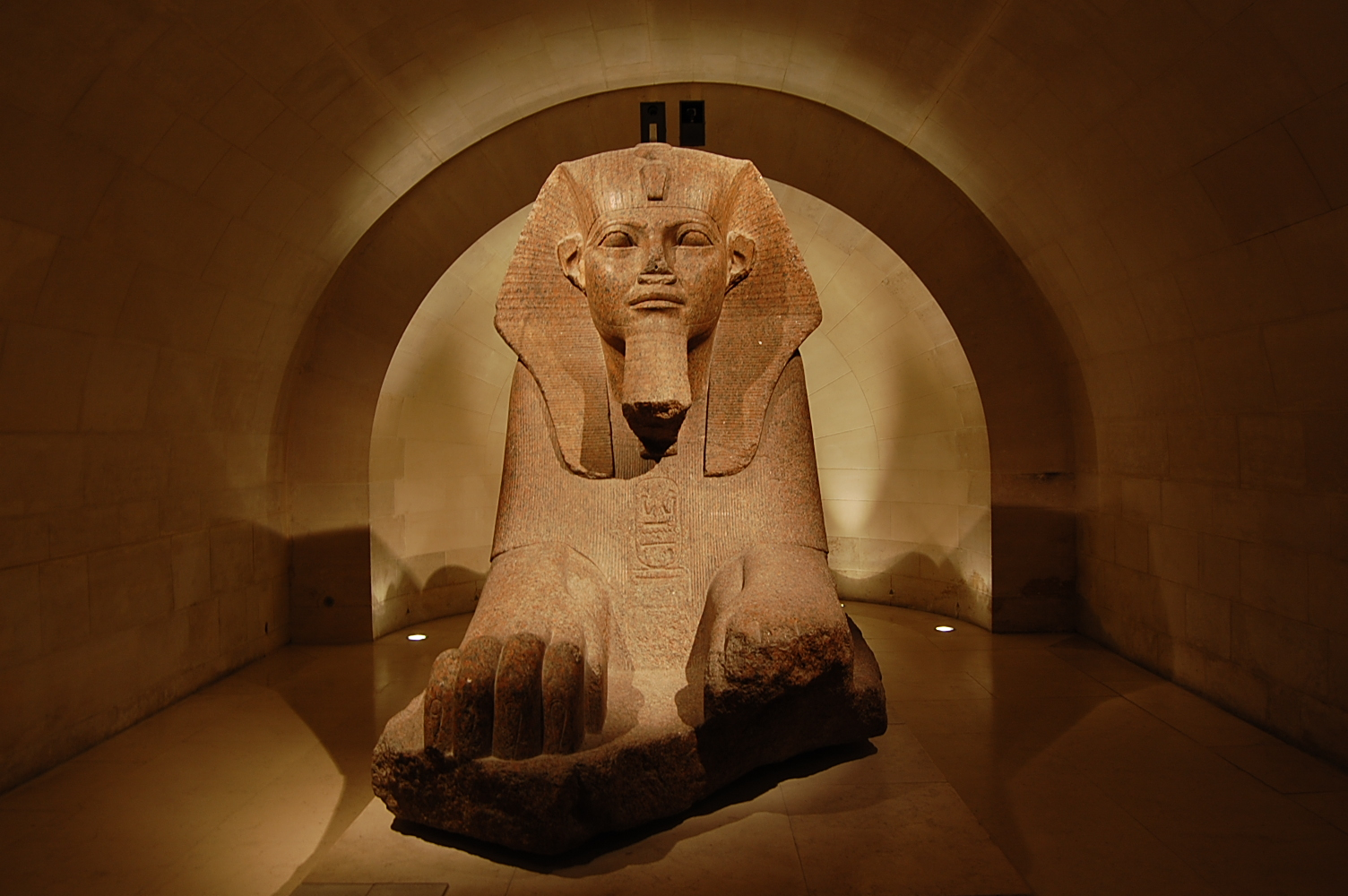
Great Sphinx of Tanis, bearing the cartouches of Amenemhat II, and usurped by Merneptah (19th Dynasty) and Shoshenq I (22nd Dynasty) Louvre, A23

=== Sole reign ===
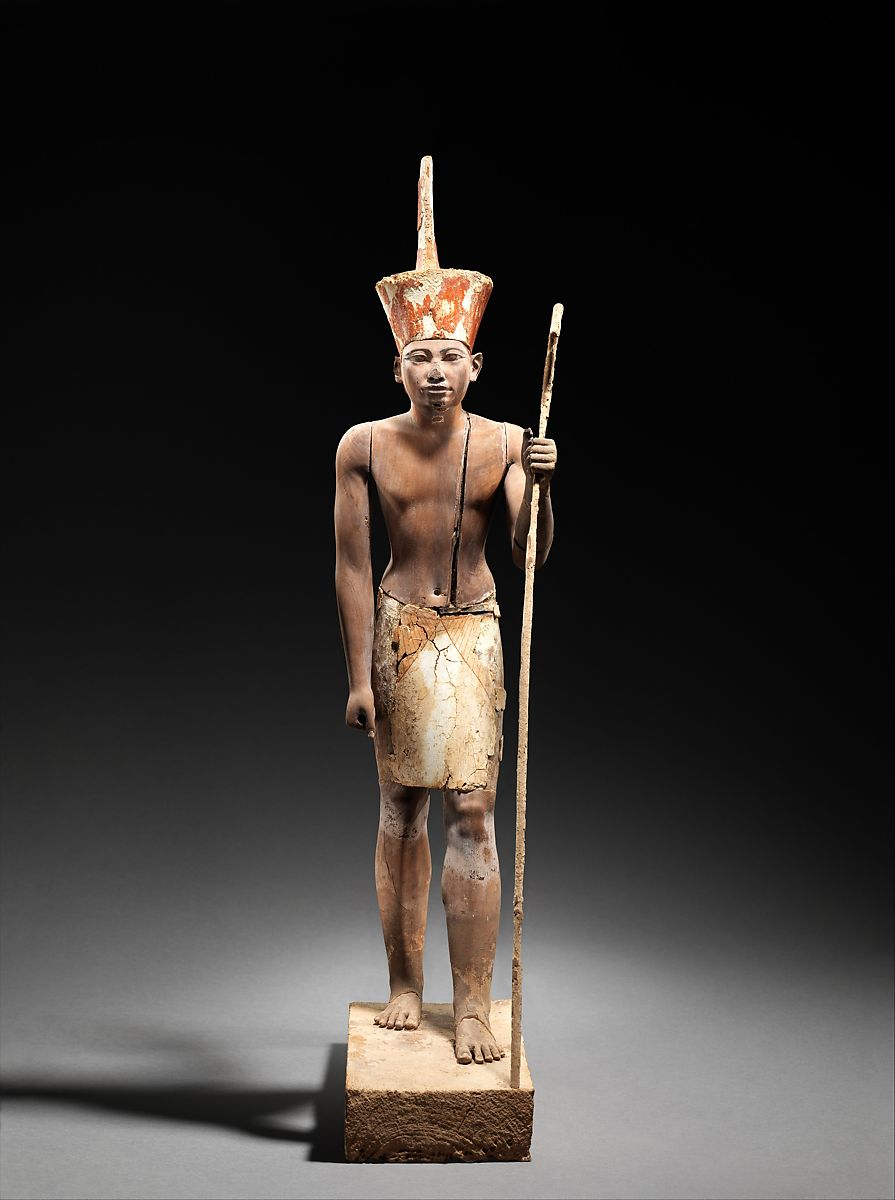
A guardian figure in a temple wearing the red crown of Lower Egypt and whose face appears to reflect the features of the reigning king, most probably Amenemhat II or Senusret II. It functioned as a divine guardian for the imiut, and it is wearing a divine shendyt that suggests the statuette was not merely a representation of the living ruler. Metropolitan Museum of Art, gallery 136

==== Annals of Amenemhat II ====
At Memphis, fragments of the so-called Annals of Amenemhat II is the most important record of his early reign (later reused during the 19th Dynasty). It provides records of donations to temples and, sometimes, of political events. It contains mention of a military expedition into Asia, the destruction of two cities – Iuai and Iasy – whose locations remain unknown, and the coming of tribute-bearers from Asia and Kush.

==== Mining expeditions ====
Under Amenemhat II several mining expeditions are known: at least three in the Sinai, one in the Wadi Gasus (year 28), and one in search for amethysts in the Wadi el-Hudi.

==== Monuments ====
Amenemhat II is known to have ordered building works at Heliopolis, Herakleopolis, Memphis, in the Eastern Delta, and to have rebuilt a ruined temple at Hermopolis. There are some mentions of the building of a "First Temple", but its identity remains unclear. A well-known finding associated with Amenemhat II is the Great Sphinx of Tanis (Louvre A23), later usurped by many other kings. He is also named on the boxes of a treasure of silver objects found under the temple of Montu at Tod: notably, many of these objects are not of Egyptian workmanship, but rather are Aegean, evidencing contacts between Egypt and foreign civilizations in the Middle Kingdom. Many private stelae bear Amenemhat's cartouches – and sometimes even his regnal years – but are insufficient to provide useful information about the events of his reign.

=== Succession ===
Amenemhat II and his successor Senusret II shared a brief coregency. At Konosso, the stela of Hapu explicitly states that the two kings ruled together for a period and it equates regnal Year 3 of Senusret II with regnal Year 35 of Amenemhat II. Unlike most of the known double-dated monuments, this is the only unquestionable example from the Middle Kingdom.

His highest attestation is "Year 35 of Amenemhat II" found on the stela of Hapu.

== Royal court ==
=== Court officials ===
==== Viziers ====
Senusret served as vizier during the late reign of Senusret I and the early reign of Amenemhat II, attested in Year 8 of Amenemhat II on a stela from Abydos. Another vizier was Ameny, who is known from the Annals of Amenemhat II at Memphis.

==== Treasurers ====
Known treasurers were Rehuerdjersen and Merykau.

==== Other officials ====
The "overseer of the gateway", Khentykhetywer, was buried near the king's pyramid. Other known officials were the "overseers of the chamber", Snofru and Senitef, and the royal scribe and iry-pat Samont. As great overseer of troops, a certain Ameny dates most likely under the king.

Siese had a remarkable career and also was a treasurer and a high steward before his vizierate. He has been presumed to be associated with Amenemhat II due to the proximity of his tomb, but may also date to a later date.

=== Provincial governors ===
- Khnumhotep II (ẖnmw-ḥtp, "Khnum is pleased") was an ancient Egyptian Great Chief of the Oryx nome (the 16th nome of Upper Egypt) during the reign of the two kings, Amenemhat II (Year 19) and Senusret II (Year 6). He is well known for his tomb at Beni Hasan and its decorations.

== Death and burial ==
The Mummy of Amenemhat II has not been recovered. With the long reign of his father and his own long reign of 35 years, he would have reached advanced age at death.

=== Pyramid ===
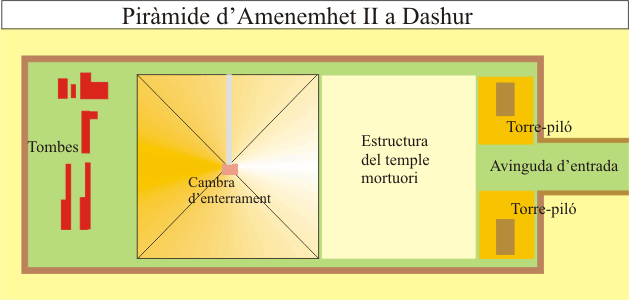
Plan of the Amenemhat II pyramid complex at Dahshur

At Dahshur, the pyramid of Amenemhat II was originally named Amenu-sekhem (Egyptian: jmnw-sḫm), meaning "Amenu is Powerful" or "Amenu is Mighty", with Amenu being an abbreviated form of Amenemhat, but now the pyramid commonly is known as the White Pyramid. Unlike his two predecessors, who built their pyramids at Lisht, Amenemhat II chose this location that had not been used as a royal cemetery since the reign of Sneferu, builder of the Red Pyramid in the 4th Dynasty. Today, the pyramid is poorly preserved and only partially excavated.

The mortuary temple adjacent the pyramid was called Djefa-Amenemhat (Egyptian: ḏfꜣ-ỉmn-m-ḥꜣt), meaning "Amenemhat is enduring" or "Amenemhat is lasting".

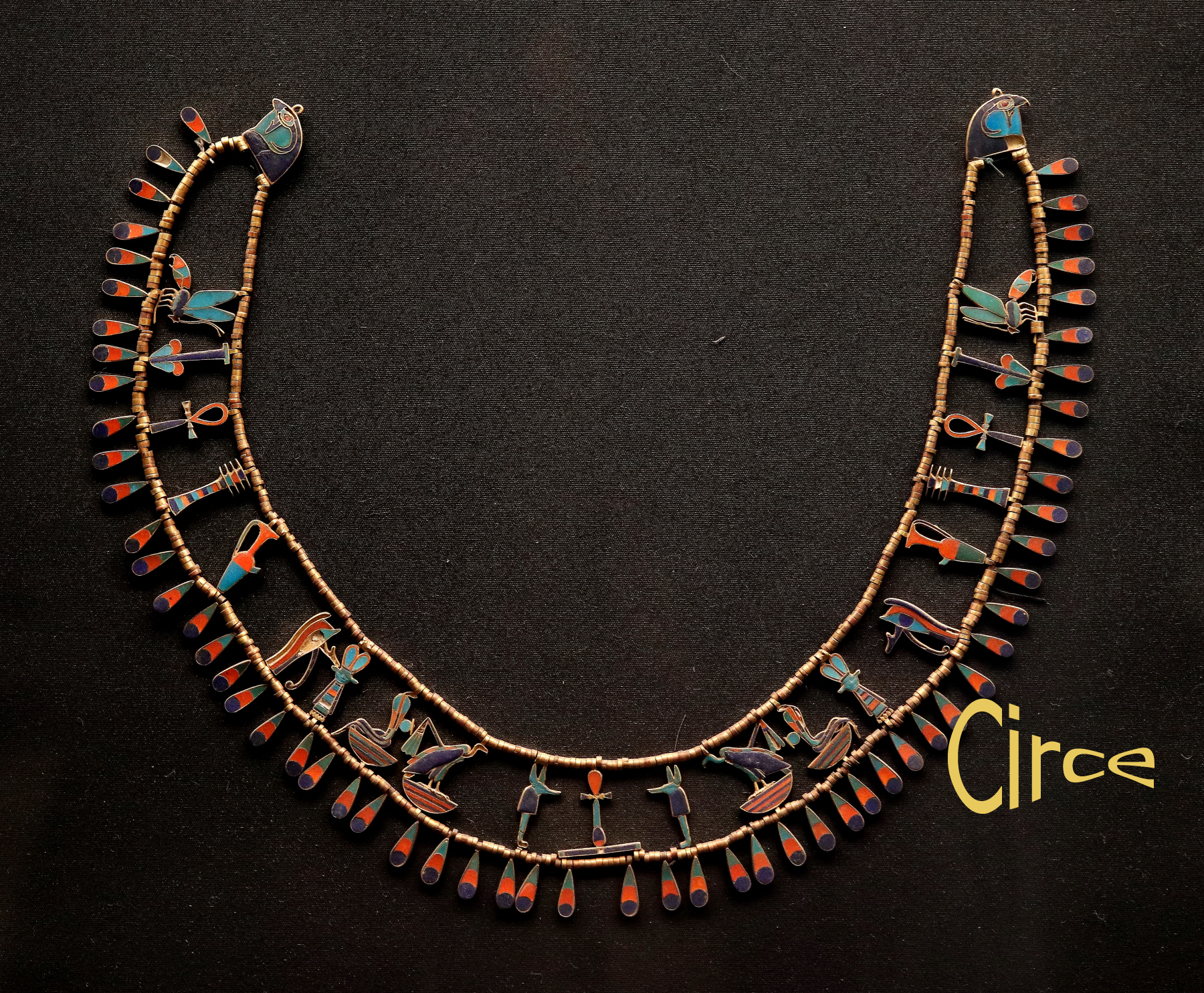
Necklace of Princess Khenmet or Khnumit, a possible daughter of Amenemhat II

Many people were buried within the pyramid complex of Amenemhat II. Their tombs were discovered by Jacques Morgan in 1894 or 1895. This included the three aforementioned princesses Ita, Itaweret, and Khenmet whose burials were found untouched, still containing their beautiful jewels and warrior weapons. Physical evidence of their skeletal remains demonstrates regular use of their weapons by the women. The tombs of the lady Sathathormeryt, the treasurer Amenhotep, and the queen Keminub also were found. Unlike the others, the tombs of the latter two were looted in antiquity and their burials are dated to the subsequent 13th Dynasty.

== Ancestry ==
Ancestors of Amenemhat II

Senusret
Amenemhat I
Nefret
Senusret I
Neferitatjenen
Amenemhat II
Senusret
Amenemhat I
Nefret
Neferu

== Scholarly theories ==
Grajetzki (2025) notes a door lintel found at Heliopolis mentioning king Seankhibre. Previously, Seankhibre was dated to the Thirteenth Dynasty, however, later scholars have analyzed the style of the relief regarding him and have determined that the style seems to resemble one associated more closely with the time of Amenemhat II. Following this assessment, the scholar Grajetzki has asked whether this was a rebel king or, that Amenemhat II may have changed his prenomen from Seankhibre to Nubkaure.

== Bibliography ==
- Delia, Robert D. (1979). "A new look at some old dates: a reexamination of Twelfth Dynasty double dated inscriptions". Bulletin of the Egyptological Seminar of New York. 1: 15–28.
- Dodson, Aidan; Hilton, Dyan (2004). The Complete Royal Families of Ancient Egypt. Thames & Hudson. ISBN 0-500-05128-3.
- Grajetzki, Wolfram (2006). The Middle Kingdom of Ancient Egypt: History, Archaeology and Society. London: Duckworth. ISBN 0-7156-3435-6.
- Hornung, Erik; Krauss, Rolf; Warburton, David, eds. (2006). Ancient Egyptian Chronology. Handbook of Oriental Studies. Leiden, Boston: Brill. ISBN 978-90-04-11385-5. ISSN 0169-9423.
- Murnane, William J. (1977). Ancient Egyptian coregencies (=Studies in Ancient Oriental Civilization, no. 40) (PDF). Chicago: The Oriental Institute of the University of Chicago. ISBN 0-918986-03-6.
- Willems, Harco (2010). "The First Intermediate Period and the Middle Kingdom". In Lloyd, Alan B. (ed.). A companion to Ancient Egypt, volume 1. Wiley-Blackwell.
- Wolfram Grajezki (2025) Amenemhat II: Golden are the souls of Ra. Ancient Egypt AE 149. The Past
