= Amenhotep (treasurer) =

Amenhotep was an ancient Egyptian treasurer and royal sealer of the Thirteenth Dynasty (around 1750 BC). The treasurer was one of the most important officials at the royal court.

He is mainly known from his burial found next to the White Pyramid of king Amenemhat II at Dahshur. His burial chamber was placed next to the burial chamber of queen Keminub and still contained the fragments of his inscribed wooden coffin, decorated with religious texts, so far not yet securely identified. He is also known from several scarab seals. The style of the seals but also of the burial equipment suggest that he dates from the Thirteenth Dynasty and not under Amenemhat III as hitherto believed.
