= Itakayt =

Ancient Egyptian princess and queen of the 12th Dynasty

Queen consort of Egypt
- King: Senusret III
- Spouse: Senusret III
- Dynasty: 12th Dynasty of Egypt
- Religion: Ancient Egyptian religion

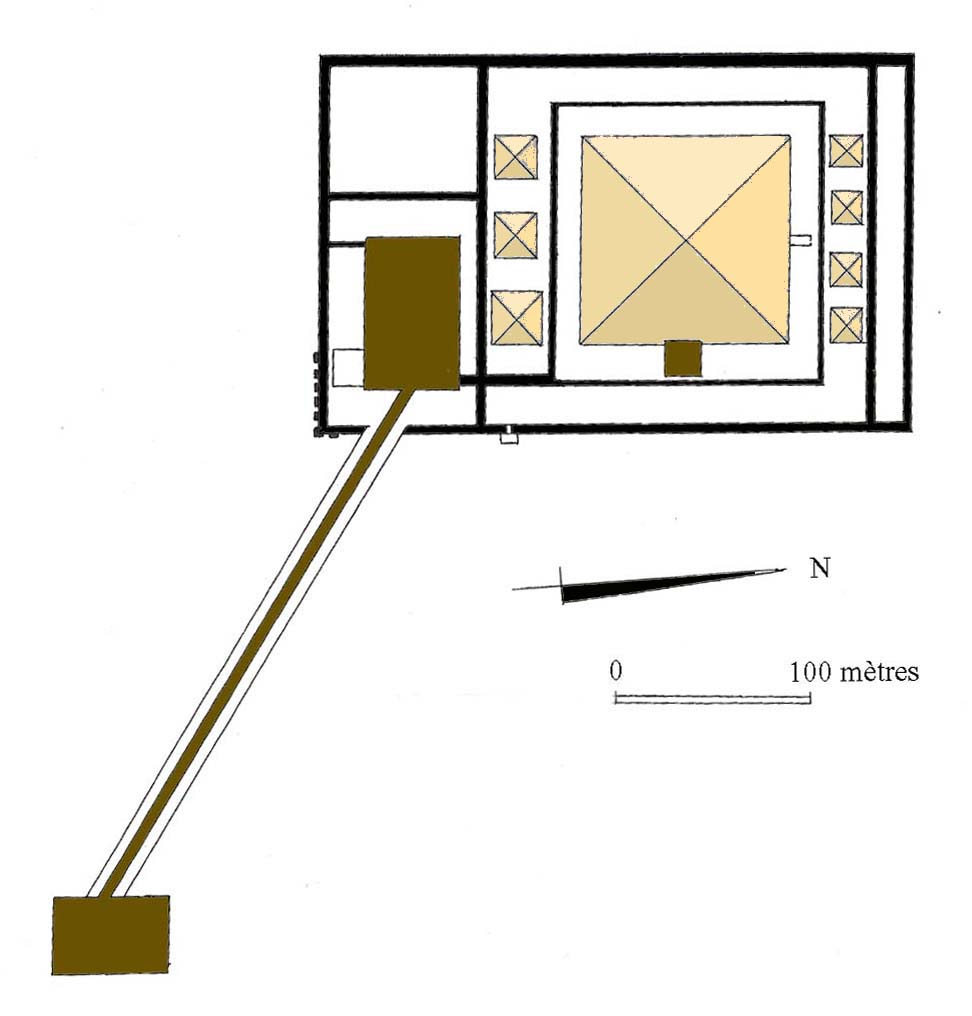
Pyramid complex of Senusret III. The pyramid of Itakayt is the third one from the top right.

Itakayt was an ancient Egyptian princess and queen of the 12th Dynasty. She is mainly known from her small pyramid next to the one of Senusret III at Dahshur.

== Life ==
In the 12th Dynasty, Itakayt (II) share the same name as Itakayt (I).

=== King's Daughter ===
She had the titles king's daughter of his body, powerful, graceful and beloved.

At Lahun, the name Itakayt appears on a papyrus fragment found at the Mortuary Temple of Senusret II, which operated during the reigns of Senusret II, Sensuret III and Amenemhat III. Here, family members of a king are listed, including Itakayt. It is uncertain to which king these members of a royal family are related. Senusret II seems to be most likely candidate, as the papyrus fragment was found at his funerary temple. This would make Itakayt a sister of Senusret III.

=== King's Wife ===
She was the king's wife of Senusret III.

== Death ==
=== The Pyramid ===
At Dahshur, the Pyramid of Itakayt on the north side of the Pyramid of Senusret III. The pyramid measured about 16.8 meters at the base, and was once perhaps also 16.8 meters high. It was built of mud bricks and covered with limestone slabs. In front of the pyramid was a small chapel decorated with reliefs. The remains of the reliefs preserved Itakayt's name. The tomb was excavated by Jaxques de Morgan in 1894.

Her burial chamber was looted but contained a sarcophagus, a canopic chest, and two canopic jars.
