= Siese =

Ancient Egyptian vizier and treasurer

- Vizier of Egypt; Treasurer
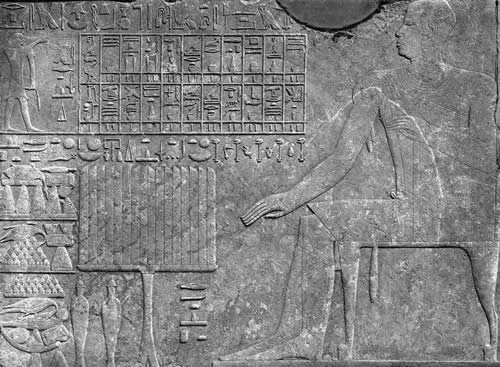
- Relief from the mastaba of Siese
- Dynasty: Twelfth Dynasty
- Pharaoh: Senusret III (?)

Siese (Ancient Egyptian: zꜣ-ꜣst "son of Isis", Egyptological pronunciation: Zaaset) was a vizier and treasurer of the Twelfth Dynasty of Egypt. He was most likely in office under Senusret III (about 1878 to 1839 BCE).

== Career ==
From objects it is possible to reconstruct elements of his career. He started as a chamberlain, then was appointed high steward, and later became treasurer.

At Dahshur, information about Siese is primarily derived from his mastaba, which was excavated by Jacques de Morgan around 1894–95 and rediscovered in 2008 by an Egyptian team. The mastaba was decorated with a palace facade and with scenes showing Siese and his family. Four panels with the image of Siese in front of an offering table were excavated by de Morgan and are now on display in the Egyptian Museum of Cairo. The burial chamber of the tomb is decorated with the Pyramid Texts. On the chamber, he is given the title treasurer and towards the end of his career he was appointed vizier.

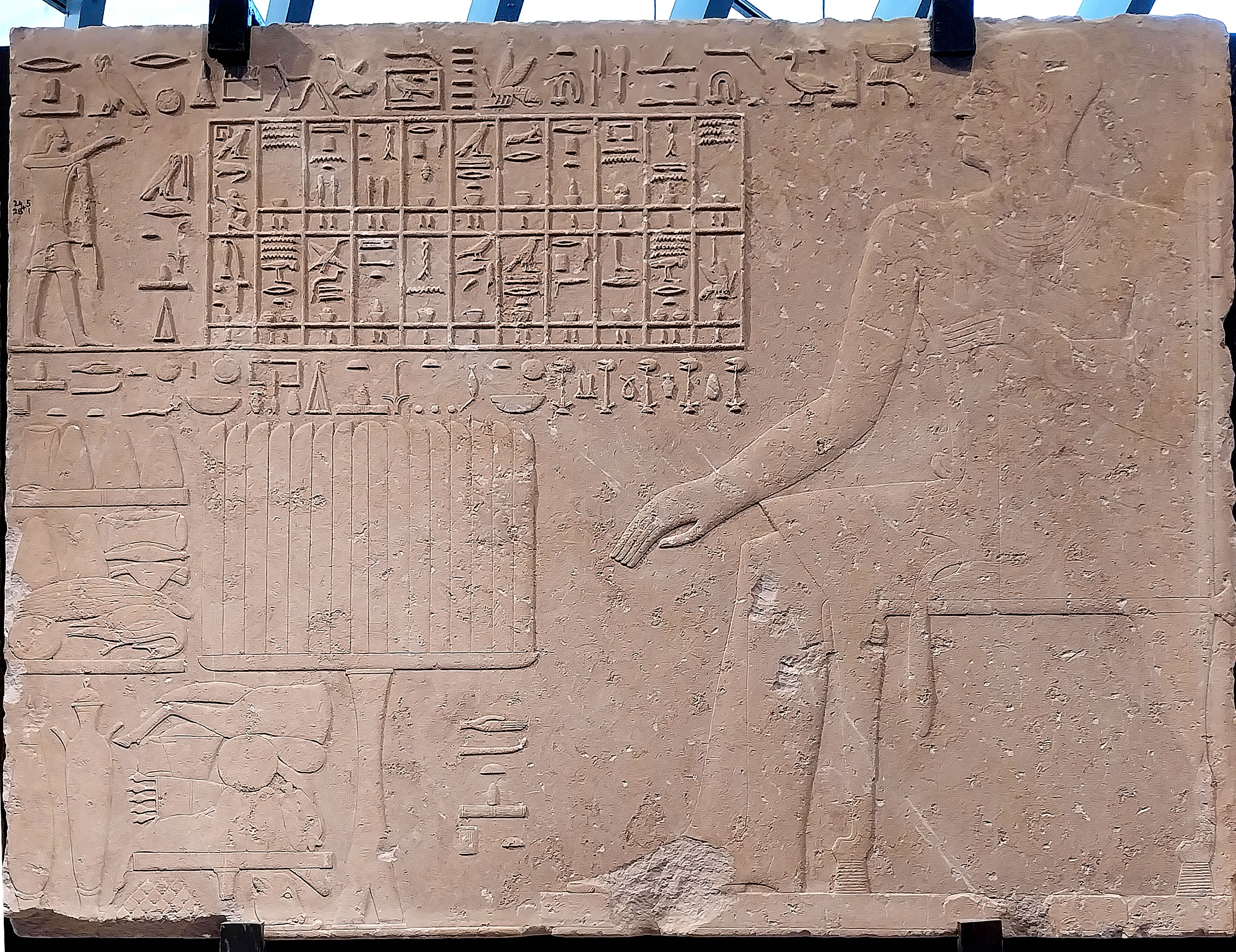
Relief displaying Siese and his titles of vizier and treasurer.

The dating of Siese's life is uncertain. For a long time it has been assumed that he was in office under king Amenemhat II, as his mastaba is close to that of this king. However, in his mastaba appear scenes that display single family members sitting on the ground with a small pile of offerings in front of them. This type of scene is only attested from the reign of king Senusret III onwards. Furthermore, the realistic depiction of Siese's face parallels reliefs in the mastaba of Sobekemhat, whose life seems to date around the reign of Senusret III. These observations indicate that Siese may have served Senusret III and not Amenemhat II.

== Literature ==
- Wolfram Grajetzki: Court Officials of the Egyptian Middle Kingdom, London 2009 p. 56-57, pl. 2 ISBN 978-0-7156-3745-6
- Samy el-Husseiny, Adel Okasha Khafagy: The Dahshur tomb of Vizier Siese rediscovered, In: Egyptian Archaeology 36 (2010), p. 21-24
- William Kelly Simpson: Lepsius Pyramid LV at Dahschur: the Mastaba of Si-Ese, Vizier of Amenemhet II, In: Pyramid studies and other essays presented to I. E. S. Edwards, John Baines [Hrsg.], London 1988, p. 57–60, ISBN 0-85698-106-0
- William Kelly Simpson: Rulers and Administrators - Dynasty 12, The Rule of the House of Itj-towy with Some Personal Reminiscenes, In: D. P. Silverman, W. K. Simpson, J. Wegner (Hrsg.): Archaism and Innovation: Studies in the Culture of Middle Kingdom Egypt, New Haven, Philadelphia 2009 p. 302 ISBN 978-0-9802065-1-7
