= Khenemetneferhedjet I =

Khenemetneferhedjet
Xnm t nfr HDt wr t
ẖnm.t nfr-ḥḏ.t-Wrt
- Great Royal Wife, Khenemetneferhedjet
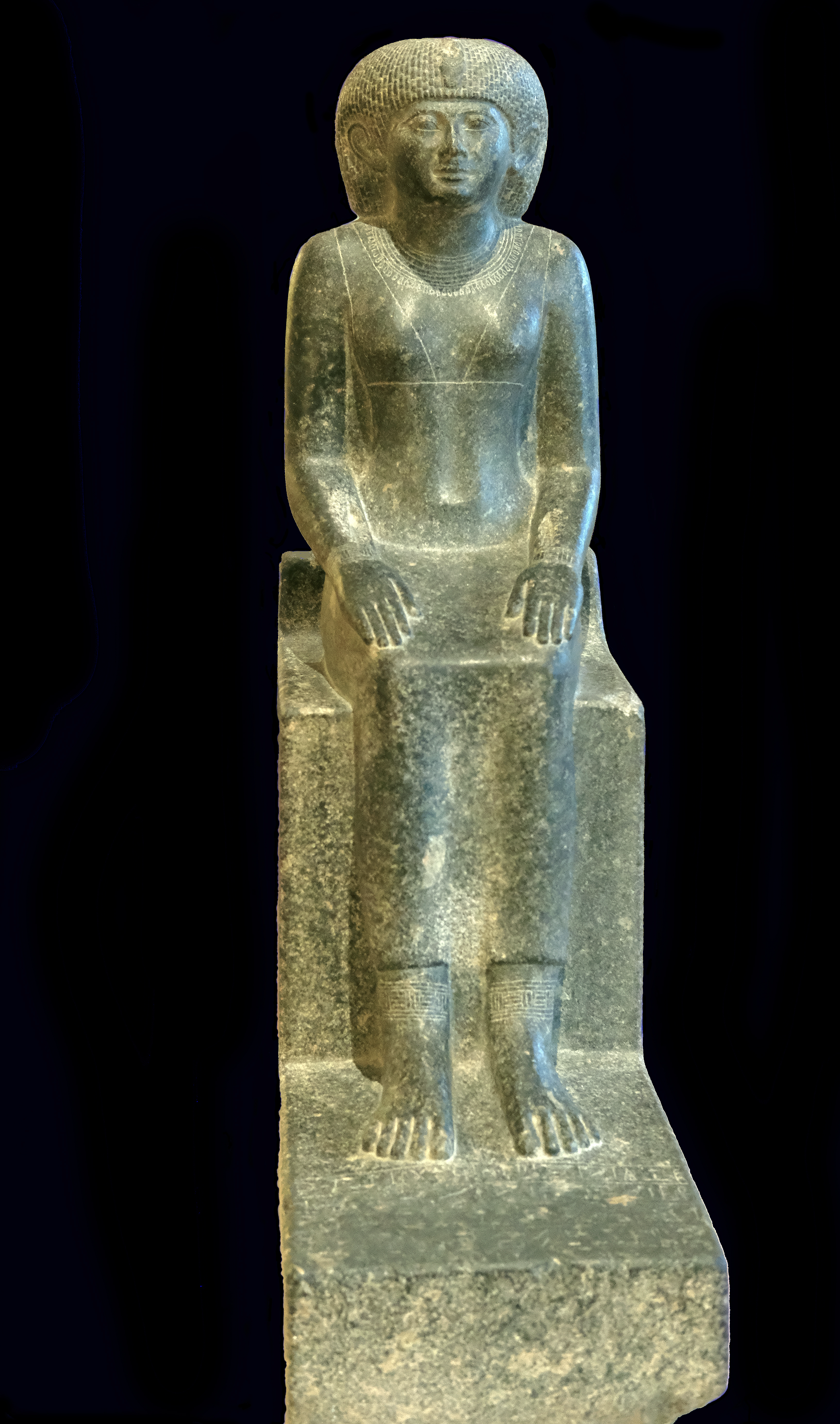
- Statue of Khenemetneferhedjet-Weret, Louvre Museum

Queen consort of Egypt
- King: Senusret II
- Spouse: Senusret II
- Issue: Senusret III
- Dynasty: 12th Dynasty of Egypt
- Religion: Ancient Egyptian religion

Khenemetneferhedjet I Weret was an ancient Egyptian queen of the 12th Dynasty, a wife of Senusret II and the mother of Senusret III.

== Biography ==
She is likely to be same person who is mentioned as the daughter of Amenemhat II on a seal (now located in New York). This would mean she was the sister of her husband. She and Nofret II have been definitely identified as two of the queen consorts of Senusret II; two other possible wives are Khenemet and Itaweret. All were also his sisters. Her name was also a queenly title used in the era: khenemetneferhedjet means "united with the white crown". Her additional name Weret means "great" or "the elder" and was probably used to differentiate her from others with this name. She is mentioned on a seal found in Kahun (now located in Tonbridge), a papyrus from Kahun (now located in Berlin), a statue (now located in the British Museum) and in her son's pyramid complex. She was probably buried in the Kahun pyramid complex built by her husband.

Her titles were: King's Wife; King's Mother; Lady of the Two Lands; King's Daughter (the latter only if she is the same person as the princess named on the seal of Amenemhat II).
