= White Pyramid =

Pyramid of Amenemhat II

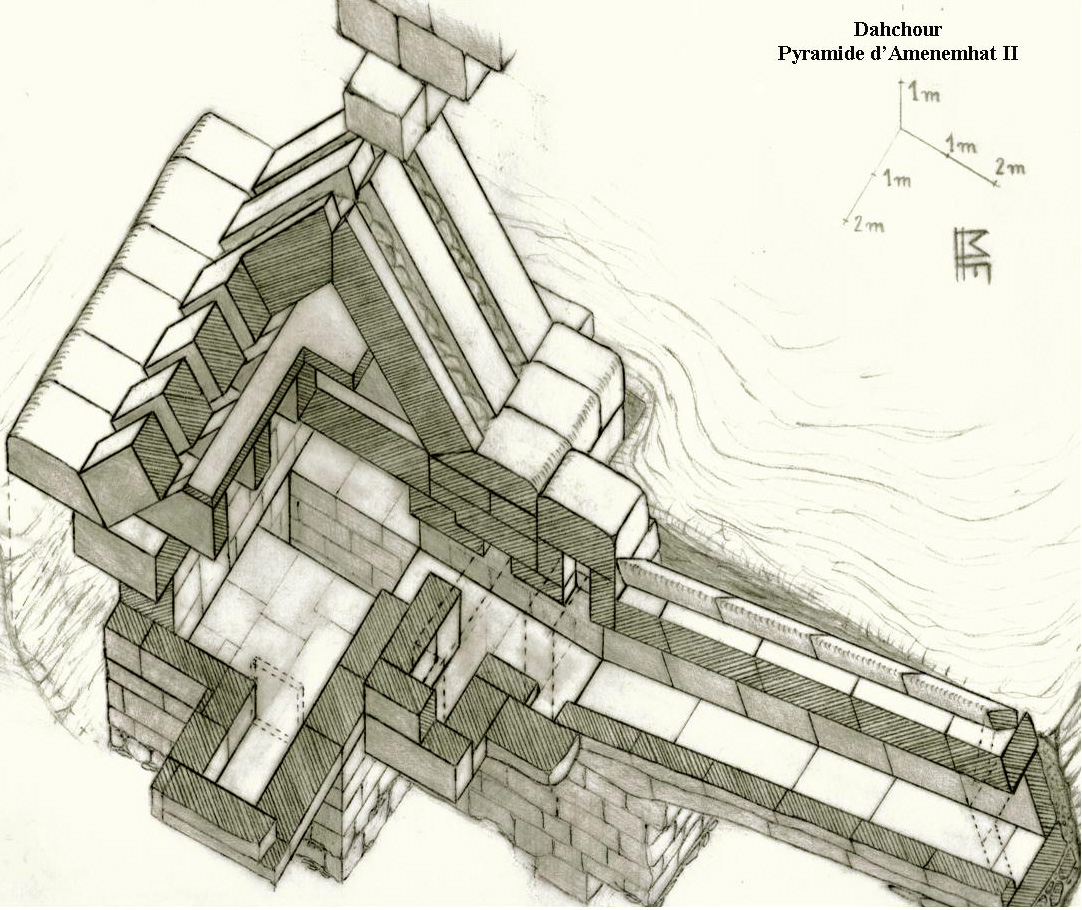
- Plan of the hypogeum.
- Interactive map of White Pyramid
- 29°48′20″N 31°13′22″E
- Owner: Amenemhat II
Ancient name
< M17 Y5 N35 G17 F4 X1 > S42 O24
Sḫm Ỉ-mn-m-ḥʒt
Sekhem Amenemhat
Amenemhat has Power
- Type: True pyramid (ruined)

The White Pyramid (Egyptian Arabic: الهرم الأبيض, romanized: al-Haram al-ʾAbyaḍ) of Amenemhat II is located in the pyramid field at Dahshur, Egypt, and is now nothing more than a pile of rubble, having been heavily quarried for stone. The remaining limestone rubble has given rise to its modern name.

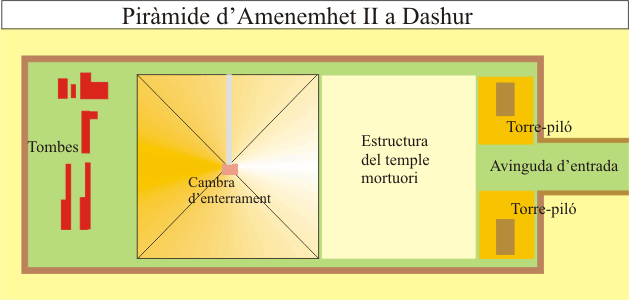
Plan of the White Pyramid complex at Dahshur

The pyramid is surrounded by a large rectangular enclosure wall. A number of intact tombs were found inside this enclosure wall belonging to the relatives of Amenemhat II including the tombs of prince Amenemhatankh and princesses Ita, Khnumet, Itaweret and Sithathormeret. A wide variety of funerary furniture was recovered from these tombs including wooden coffins, alabaster perfume jars, and canopic chests. There was also a large quantity of beautiful jewellery in the tombs of Ita and Khnumet.

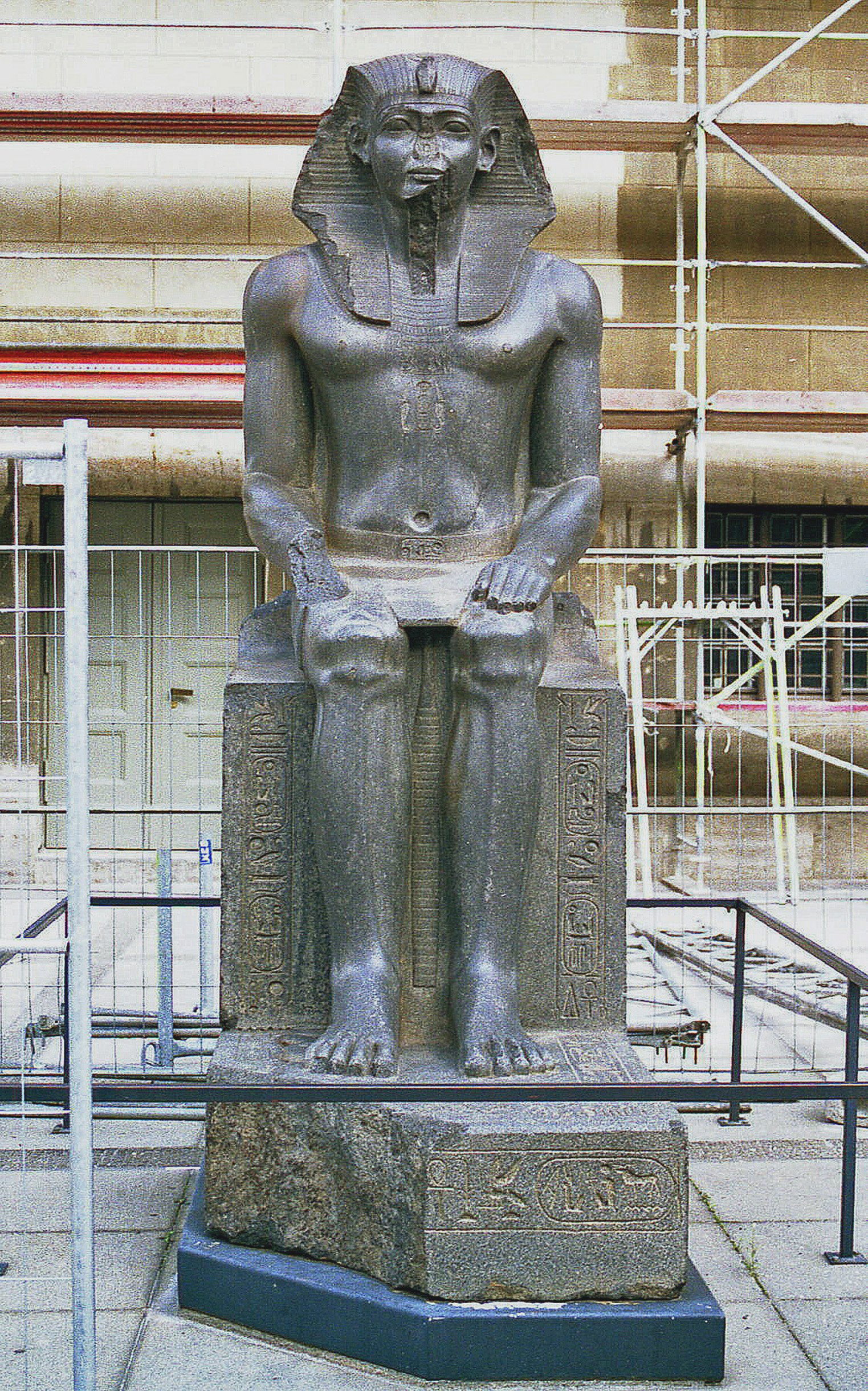
Statue of Amenemhat II that was later usurped by 19th Dynasty pharaohs, but possibly originating from the White Pyramid complex.

In 1894 and 1895, Jacques de Morgan dug in the pyramid complex, concentrating on the surrounding royal graves, with other areas not being explored. A full-scale investigation of the whole complex has yet to be undertaken.

== See also ==
- List of Egyptian pyramids

== Sources ==
- Budge, Ernest Alfred Wallis (1920). An Egyptian Hieroglyphic Dictionary: With an index of English words, King List and Geographical List with Indexes, List of Hieroglyphic Characters, Coptic and Semitic Alphabets, etc. Vol. 2. London: J. Murray. OCLC 697736910.
- Lehner, Mark (2008). The Complete Pyramids. New York: Thames & Hudson. ISBN 978-0-500-28547-3.
- Verner, Miroslav (2001d). The Pyramids: The Mystery, Culture and Science of Egypt's Great Monuments. New York: Grove Press. ISBN 978-0-8021-1703-8.
