= Amenemhatankh =

Egyptian prince

< i mn n m HAt > anx n x
Amenemhatankh
ỉmn-m-ḥ3.t-ˁnḫ
in hieroglyphs
Era: Middle Kingdom
(2055–1650 BC)

Amenemhatankh (his name means “Amenemhat lives”) was an ancient Egyptian prince of the 12th Dynasty, son or brother of Amenemhat II.

== Attestations ==
Amenhemhatankh is mentioned on a false door which was originally in his tomb but was found reused in the tomb of Khenemet and Siese at Dahshur. He is also mentioned on the base of a broken statue of him, found in Saqqara and now in the Egyptian Museum, on which his appointment of a priest named Tetiemsaf is recorded. His name also appears on a statue of Horemsaf from Saqqara; on a statue base found in the Precinct of Mut in the Karnak temple, now located in Cairo and in the tomb inscriptions of the vizier Khnumhotep, Tomb 2 at Dahshur.

Amenemhatankh could be a son of Amenemhat II, but it is also possible they were brothers.
