= Khenmet =

Egyptian king's daughter of the Twelfth Dynasty

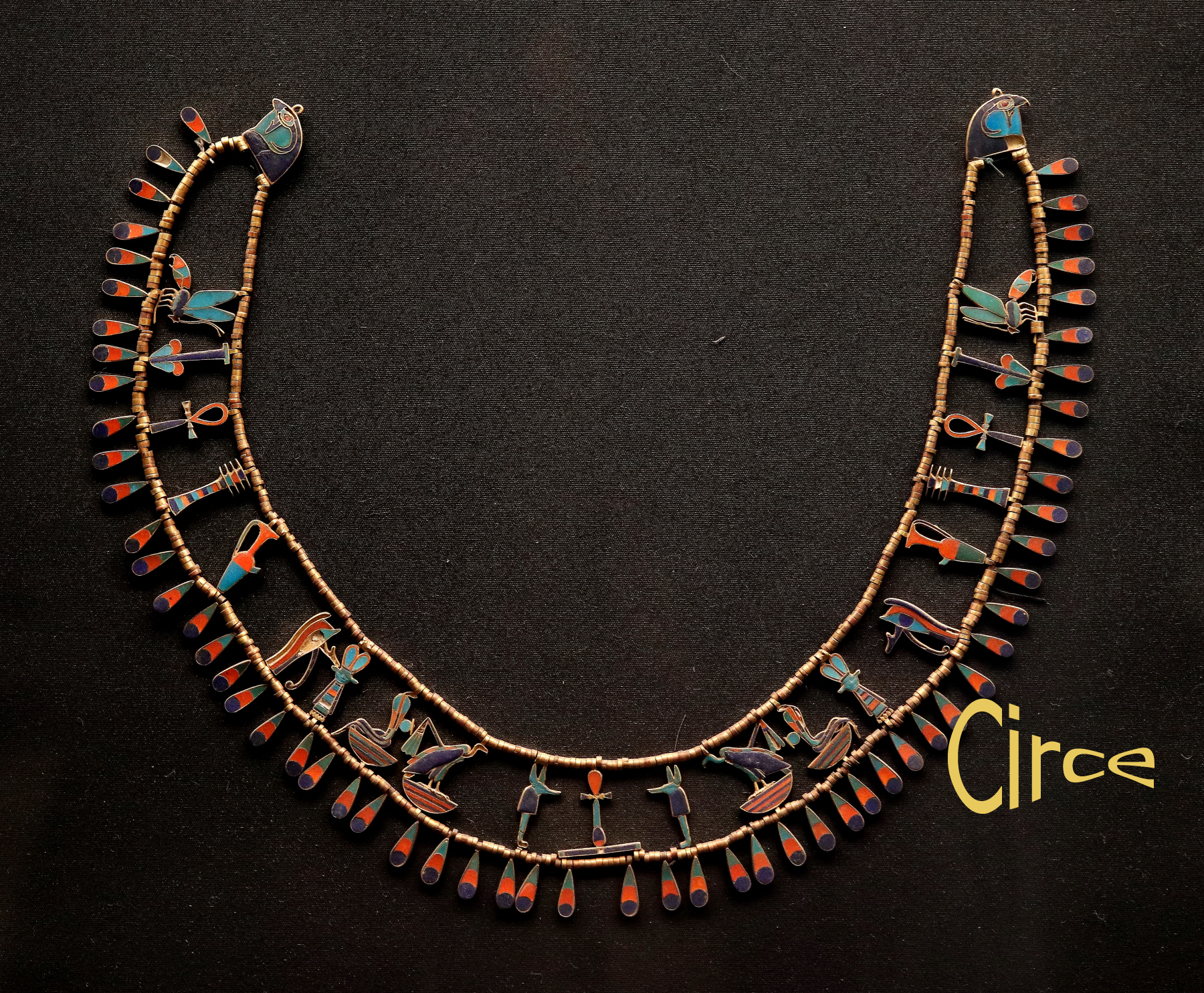
An exquisite necklace of Princess Khenmet from her Dashur burial bears the symbols of several major Ancient Egyptian deities

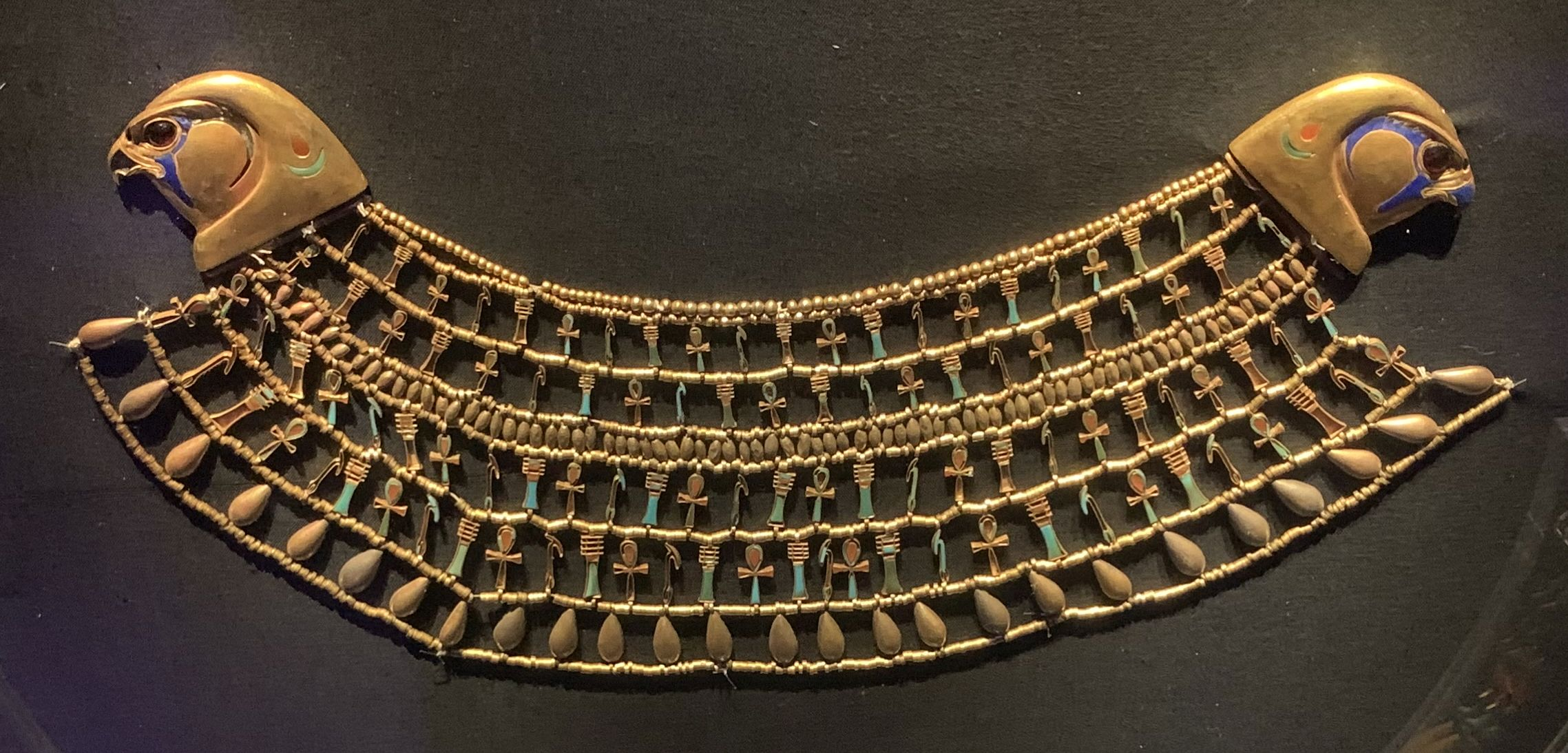
Necklace from the burial of Princess Khenmet

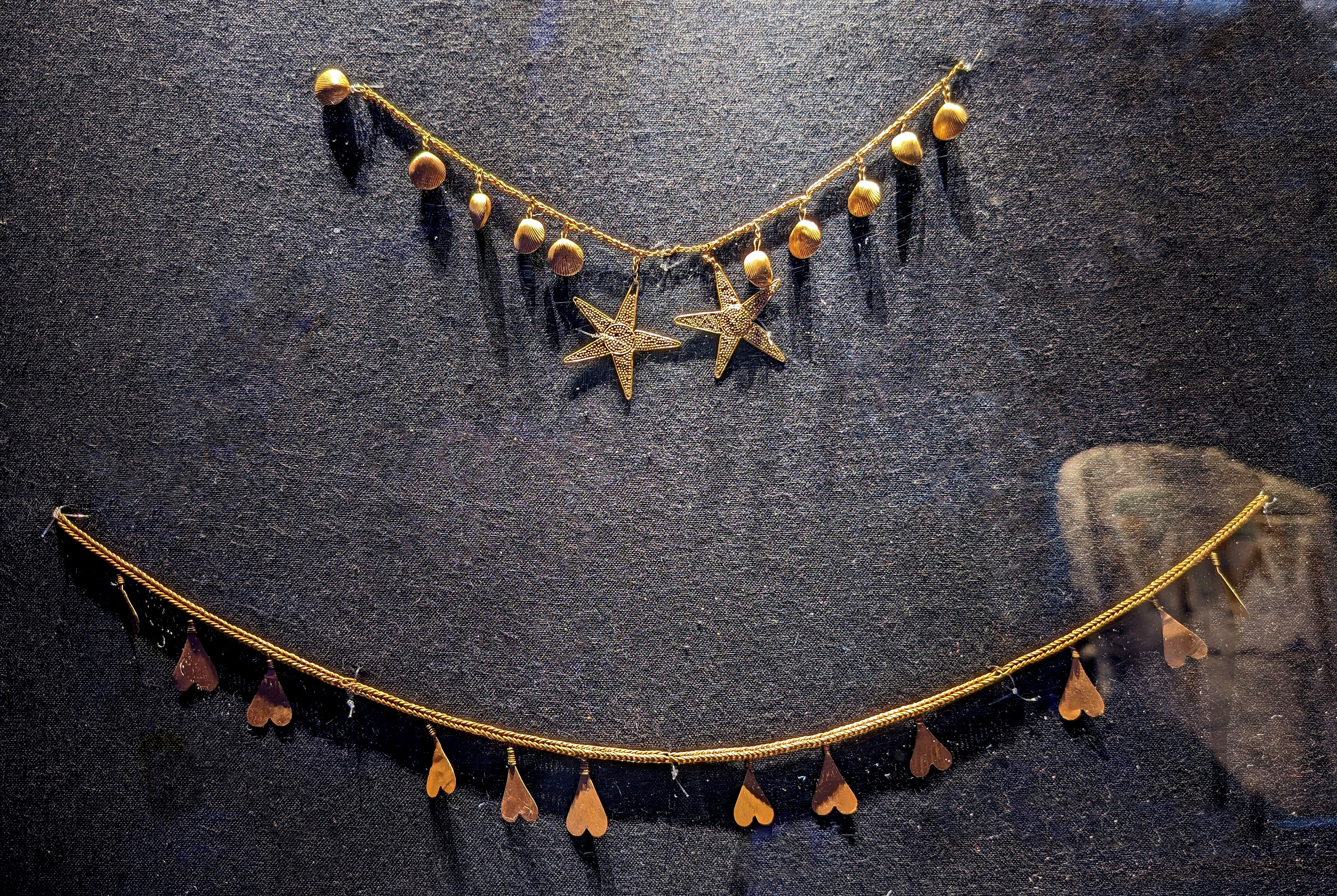
Necklaces from the tomb of Princess Khenmet

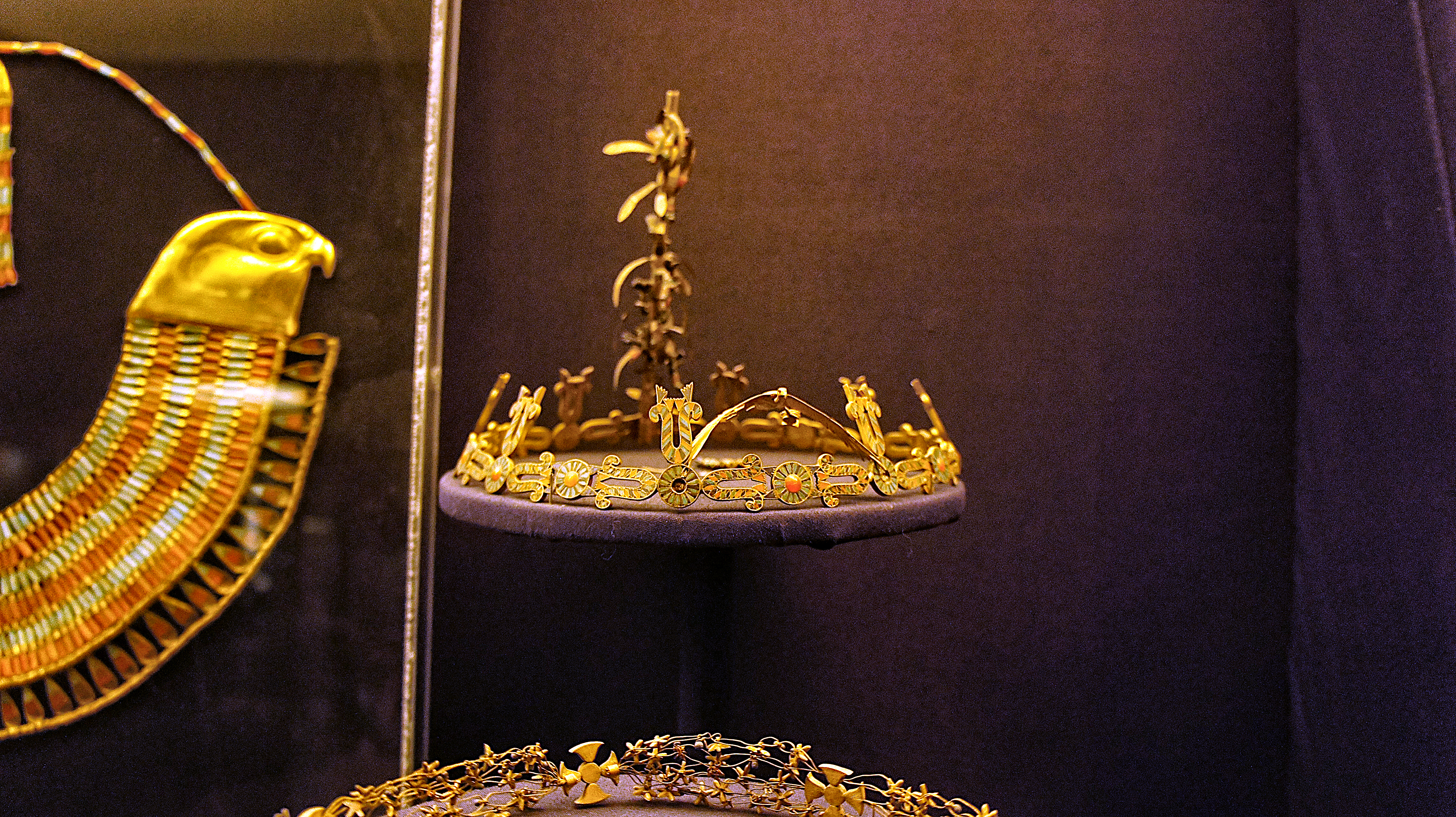
Crown of Princess Khenmet, now in the Egyptian Museum

Khenmet or Khnumit (fl. c. 1800 BC) was an ancient Egyptian woman who was a royal daughter of a king of the Twelfth Dynasty. She is mainly known from her unrobbed tomb containing a set of outstanding personal adornments, weapons, and royal insignia.

Princess Khenmet is only known from her burial. Her tomb was next to the White Pyramid in Dahshur within the burial complex of king Amenemhat II. On the western side of the pyramid were three underground galleries with each of two tombs. Four of these tombs, including those of Khenmet as well as Ita and Itaweret were found unlooted.

Khenmet was buried in a set of three containers. There was an outer, undecorated sarcophagus, next, a wooden coffin decorated on the outside with gold foil and on the inside with hieroglyphic texts. Finally, there was an inner anthropoid coffin that was found only badly preserved. The body of Khenmet was adorned with an array of jewellery including a broad collar, armlets, and anklets. Typical for royal burials of the Middle Kingdom, many royal insignia, including weapons were found next to her body. Research indicates that her body demonstrates regular use of warrior weapons.

Further personal adornments were found in the small chamber next to her sarcophagus. These included two crowns and parts of a necklace made of gold. The latter is most likely not an Egyptian work of art, but was perhaps created in Crete.

The father of Khenmet is undocumented, but since she was buried in the pyramid complex of king Amenemhat II, it seems likely that she was his daughter.

Some researchers point out that the burial equipment found is typical for the late Twelfth Dynasty. The same is true for the pottery found in the burials.
