= Ameny (general) =

Ancient Egyptian general

- Buried: Giza, Egypt
- Allegiance: Egypt
- Service years: c. 1910 BC
- Spouses: Itet; Renefankh; Medhu

Ameny (fl. c. 1910 BC) was an ancient Egyptian official of the 12th Dynasty, most likely in office under king Amenemhat II. Ameny was a great overseer of the troops and is mainly known from a series of stelae (Paris, Louvre C 35, Cairo CG 20546, London, British Museum 162 once set up at Abydos and there adorning a chapel. On these stelae, he bears the most important ranking titles of a member of the elite, foremost of action, royal sealer and sole friend. As a great overseer of the troops, he was the leading official at the royal responsible for organizing manpower that was used in military enterprises, but also for building projects. Ameny was the son of a person called Qebu. On each stelae a different wife is mentioned. These are Itet, Renefankh, and Medhu. His tomb was found at Lisht, but is not yet fully excavated. The stelae of Ameny are not dated by any king's name. However, on stylistic grounds, they most likely date under king Senusret I and Amenemhat II. Some of the biographical phrases on the stelae indicate a date more precisely under the latter king.
