= Ameny (vizier under Amenemhat II) =

Egyptian vizier

- Vizier of Egypt
- Tenure: c. 1900 BC
- Dynasty: 12th Dynasty
- Pharaoh: Amenemhat II

Ameny (fl. c. 1900 BC) was an ancient Egyptian vizier under Middle Kingdom king Amenemhat II, in the 12th Dynasty. Ameny appears on the fragment of an annal stone of the king. The fragment was found by Flinders Petrie in Memphis and mentions a statue of this vizier. Ameny is perhaps also known from an offering table. However, the name Ameny belongs to the most common names of the Middle Kingdom. Therefore, the identity of both people on these objects is far from certain.

== Literature ==
- Wolfram Grajetzki: Court Officials of the Egyptian Middle Kingdom, London 2009 p. 30 ISBN 978-0-7156-3745-6
