= Senet (queen) =

Ancient Egyptian king's wife and king's mother

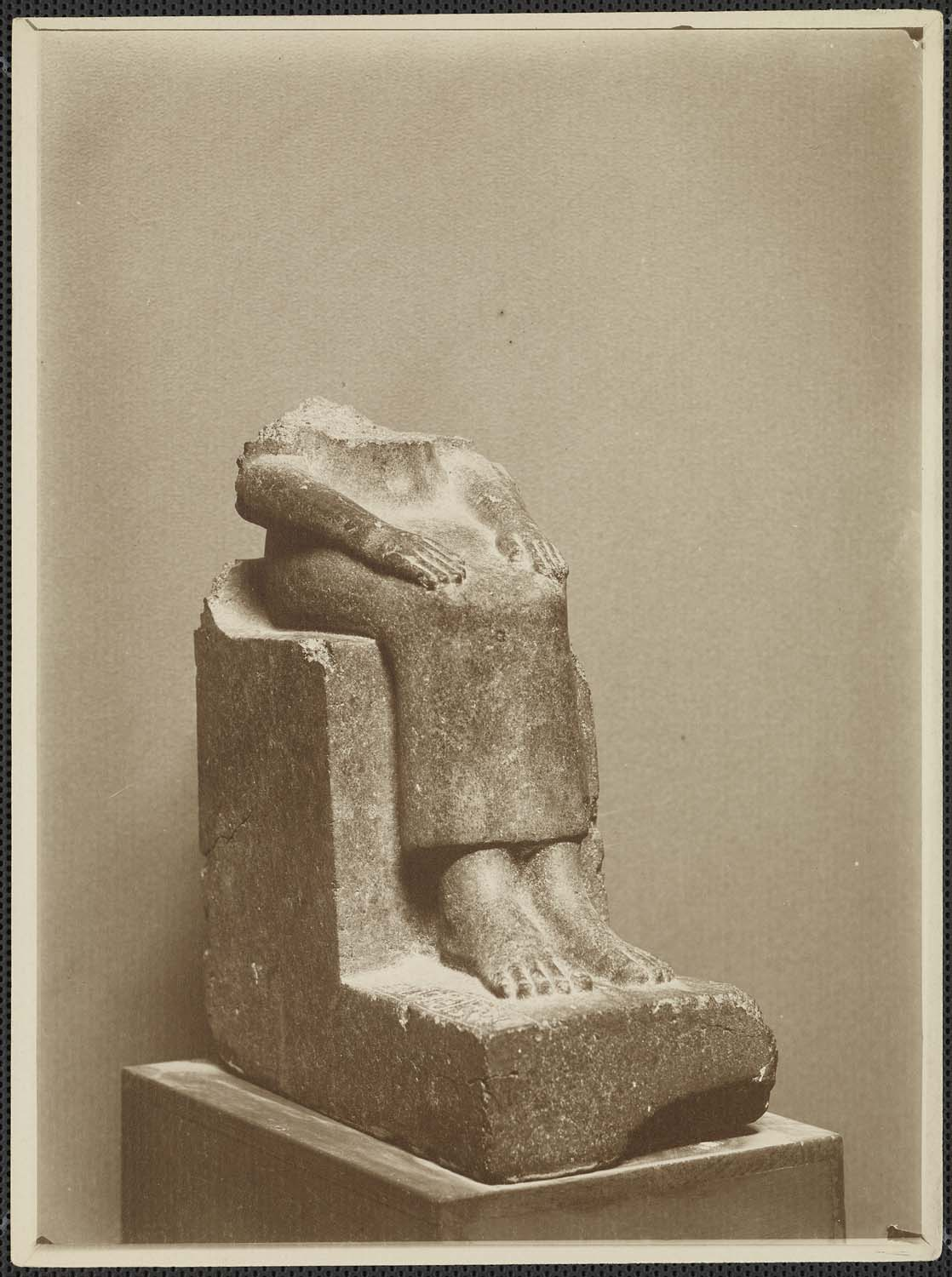
- Statue of Queen Senet, at the Egyptian Museum in Cairo.

Queen consort of Egypt
- Spouse: Amenemhat II (possibly)
- Dynasty: 12th Dynasty of Egypt

Senet was an ancient Egyptian king's wife and king's mother, known from three statues, that date to the Middle Kingdom, perhaps to the 12th Dynasty.

== Queen ==
During the 12th Dynasty, Senet held royal titles within the dynasty indicating she was the wife of a king and mother of a king. Her husband and royal son are not known for sure. Gae Callender proposed king Amenemhat II as her husband, as his wife is not yet identified for sure, while for most other 12th Dynasty kings a wife is known.

=== Statuary ===
There are three known statues of a woman named Senet. These statues bear the titles "King’s Wife," and "King’s Mother" (mwt-nswt). The statues show the queen sitting on a throne. For two of the statues the upper part is missing. A third statue preserves the upper part but the face is heavily damaged.
