= Ita (princess) =

Ancient Egyptian figure (c. 1850 BC)

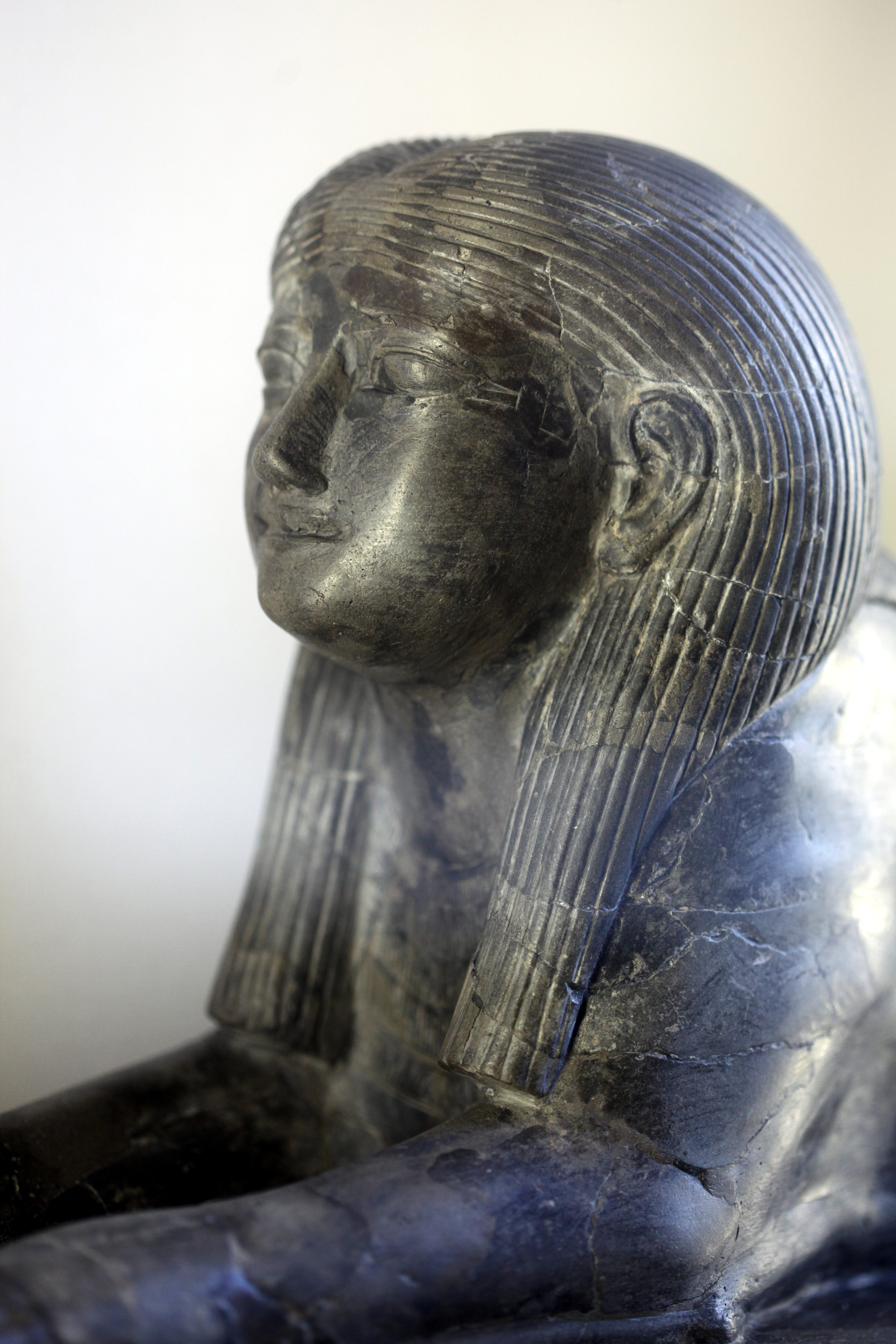
Sphinx dedicated to Ita. Louvre, AO 13075.

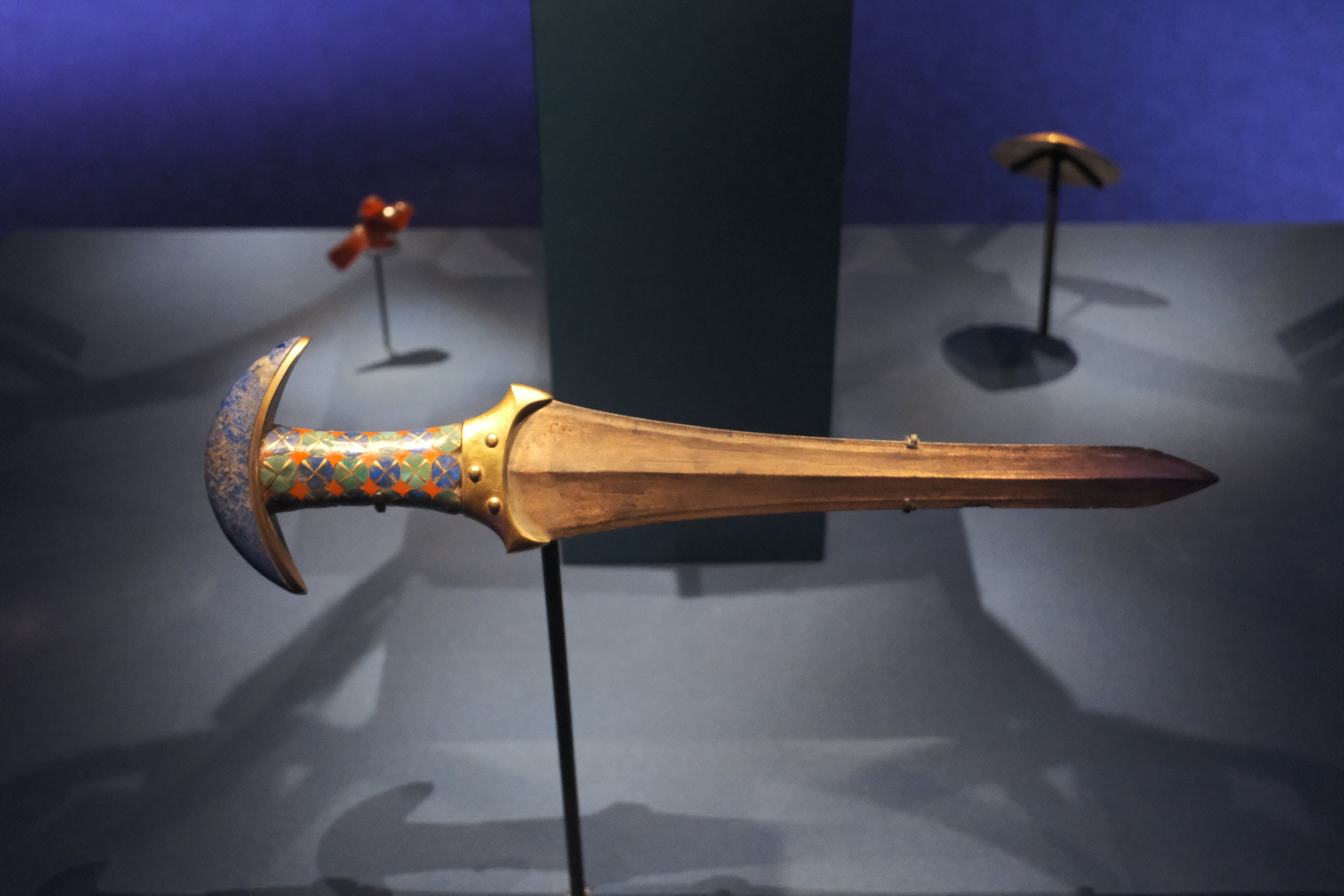
Dagger of princess Ita found in her coffin

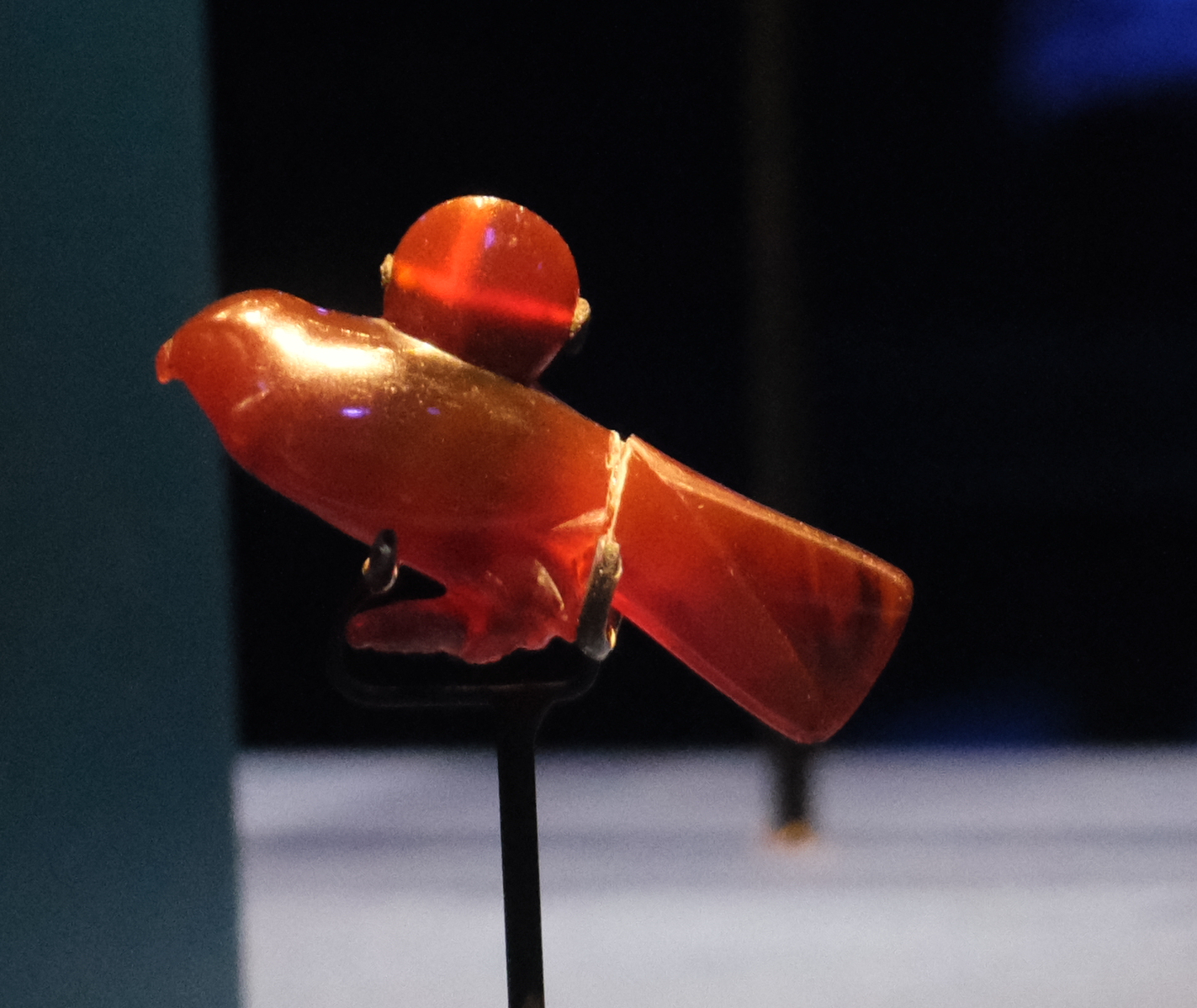
Carnelian hawk pendant of princess Ita.

Ita (fl. c. 1850 BC) was an Ancient Egyptian king's daughter who lived in the 12th Dynasty in the Middle Kingdom of Egypt. She was buried in his tomb and her remains, personal jewelry, and warrior weapons bearing her name survived without plundering. Her burial has been the subject of later research and established greater knowledge about her and others discovered in the early excavation.

== Life ==
Her name, Ita, was a name element also found among several women in the 12th Dynasty, see Itakayet and Itaweret.

=== King's Daughter ===
She held the title "King's Daughter of his Body" and "iry-pat".

=== Attestation ===
At the time of discovery of her burial, it was uncertain whether two women named, Ita, the one known from a sphinx statue in the Louvre Museum collection and the one known from the tomb, are identical.

- Louvre AO 13075: in Qatna (Syria), a small sphinx of Ita (16x26x58 cm) was found bearing her name and titles, noblewoman (iryt-p`t) and king's daughter of his body.

== Death ==
=== Burial ===
At Dahshur, Ita was buried in a shaft tomb within the pyramid complex of the pyramid of Amenemhat II along with other royalty. Hers was part of a series of tombs located on the western side of the pyramid. It had a vertical shaft leading to a subterranean chamber. The burial chamber contained her sarcophagus and it was relatively simple in design. It was discovered by the French archaeologist Jacques de Morgan in 1894. The location of the tomb indicated to those early researchers that she was related to and perhaps, a daughter of Amenemhat II.

The burial was found intact and contained a decorated wooden coffin, long religious texts including her name, and a set of precious personal adornments, royal insignia and warrior weapons, including a richly adorned dagger. The function of the weapons and royal insignia is uncertain. Mark Smith wonders whether they confer royal powers. Others observe that these objects are connected with Osiris and might identify the deceased with that god.

According to her skeletal remains, Ita was approximately 20 to 34 years old when she died. She was approximately 151 to 155 cm tall. For the new evaluation of her preserved skeletal remains, about 58 percent of the bones were examined. Most importantly, the skulls from the remains of the burials found during the early excavation were not included in the later study of the individuals found in that early excavation.
