= Itakayt (Senusret I) =

Itakayt (fl. c. 1950 BC) was an ancient Egyptian king's daughter of the 12th Dynasty in the Middle Kingdom of Egypt. She is mainly known from her small pyramid next to the one of Senusret I at Lisht.

== Life ==
=== King's Daughter ===
Relief fragments found at her burial show her titles: beloved king's daughter, Iry-pat and Haty-a. The title Haty-a is unusual for a female indicating a mayor/governor of a city.

== Death ==
=== The Pyramid ===
At Listh, the Pyramid of Itakayt was next to the Pyramid of Senusret I. The pyramid was 16.8 x 16.8 meters large at the base and might have been also 16.8 meters high. The burial chamber was reached by two shafts, one perhaps just for the construction workers. The burial chambers seem to be unfinished. There were no remains of a sarcophagus (stone coffin), while sarcophagi were found in the other pyramids.

Near the pyramid was a small temple that was decorated with reliefs. The reliefs were found in small fragments, but they provide the name and the titles of Itakayt.
