= Itaweret =

Ancient Egyptian king's daughter

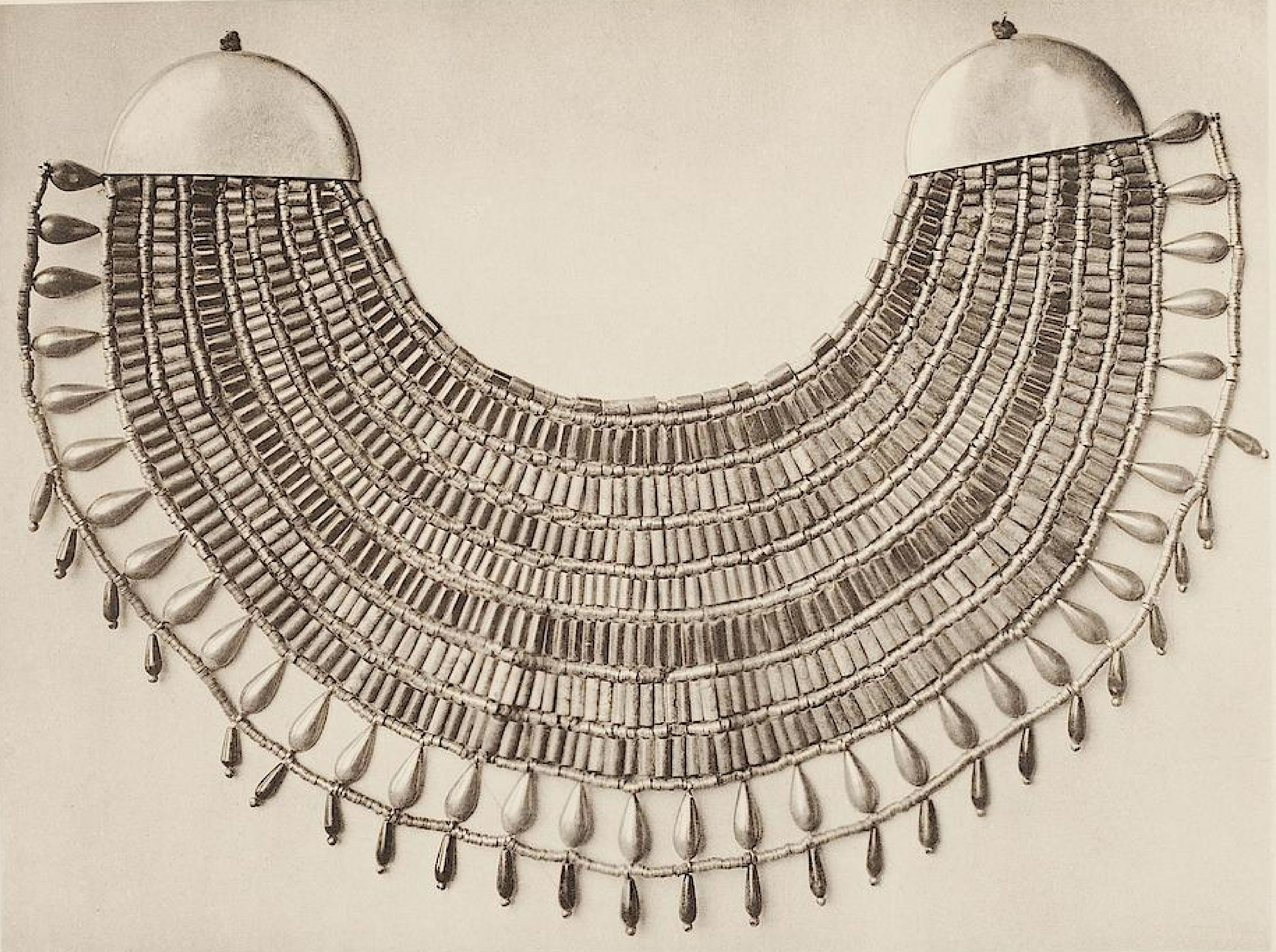
Broad collar of Itaweret, found on her body in black and white

Itaweret (Ita-the elder) was an Ancient Egyptian king's daughter or princess who lived in the 12th Dynasty. She is known from her burial next to the pyramid of king Amenemhat II at Dahshur, in a gallery tomb that contained both her burial and that of a woman called Sathathormeryt. Her burial was found intact by the French archaeologist Jacques de Morgan betweeen 1894 to 1895 and contained a decorated wooden coffin and canopic box with longer religious texts including her name as well as a broad collar on her mummy.Some personal adornments and warrior weapons were found in her tomb as well. The location of the tomb might indicate that she was a daughter of Amenemhat II, but final proof is missing. Remarkable is the wooden statue of a swan found in one of her burial apartments.

According to her skeleton remains, Itaweret was about 20 to 34 years old when she died. She was about 151.2 to 156.9 cm tall and her skeleton was about 40% complete. Her remains also indicated skeletal characteristics that seem to support interpretation as a sign of regular use of a bow and perhaps, of warrior weapons similar to those buried with her and bearing her name. The latter interpretation however, is debated by other researchers.

== Biography ==
Itaweret bore the titles of "King's Daughter" and "She who is United to the White Crown". These titles establish that she was both a king's daughter and a king's wife. The location of the tomb might indicate that she was a daughter of Amenemhat II and, therefore, a wife of Senusret II, but definitive proof is lacking. Julien Siesse dates this burial to the late Twelfth Dynasty, like that of Princess Sathathormeryt with whom she is buried, as well as those of Princesses Ita and Khenmet, who also have a double burial nearby. However, this does not preclude the possibility that these princesses were daughters of Amenemhat II (they could have been born late and died at the beginning of the reign of Amenemhat III. Only three decades separate the end of Amenemhat II's reign and the beginning of Amenemhat III's reign.

== Tomb ==
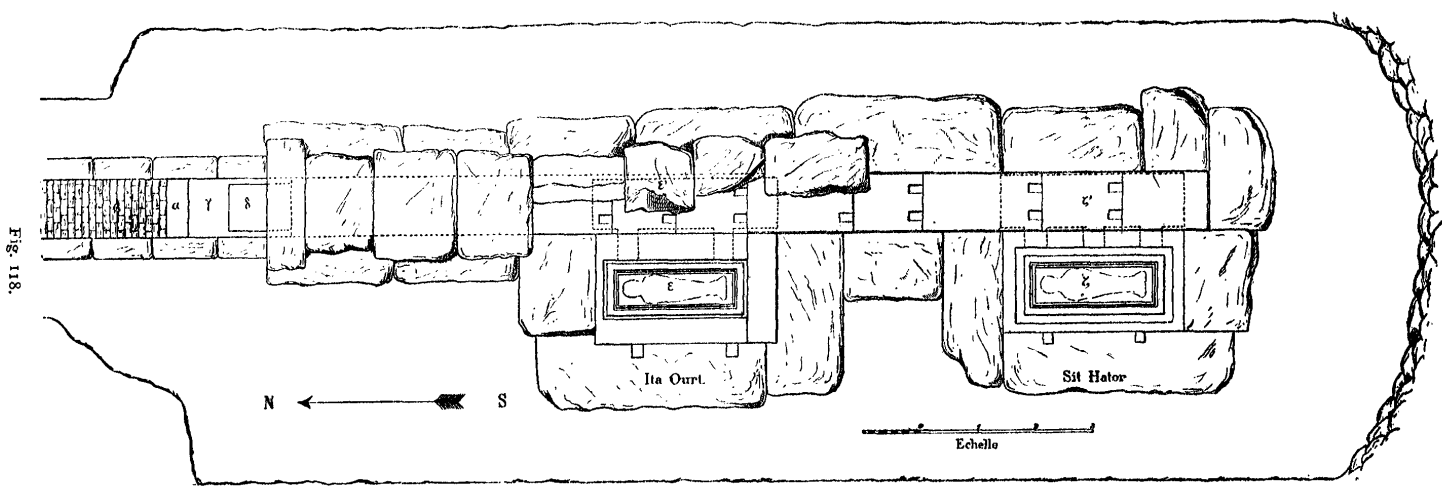
The plan of the double tomb of Itaweret and Sathathormeryt

The intact tomb--oriented north-south and situated slightly west of the burial place of Queen Keminub and a certain Amenhotep--was a double burial, housing Princess Sathathormeryt on one side and Itaweret on the other. It was constructed in an open-cut manner within a cavity hewn into the bedrock. A long, sloping brick corridor, lined with stone at its lower end, provided access to the entrance of the burial chambers. This led to a horizontal corridor that was sealed along its entire length. The two sarcophagi were located to the right of the corridor and set at a level below its paving; the slabs covering the sarcophagi were thin, finely fitted, and laid without mortar. Notably, these slabs still bore the numbers assigned to them by the builders prior to installation.

Itaweret's sarcophagus was made of pink granite, carved with "rare perfection." It housed a wooden coffin that was gold-leafed on the outside and decorated with painted texts on the inside. Upon discovery, the mummy lay at the bottom of the coffin amidst various fabrics, several of which were dyed purplish-red. The princess was laid on her back with her hands crossed over her upper thighs. Several bracelets made of gold and hard-stone beads adorned her wrists and ankles. A wide necklace of gold beads and ornaments also encircled her neck; it was fastened by two gold clasps.

A Life sized Swan discovered in Itaweret's tomb

To the left of Itaweret's mummy lay staffs, scepters, a mace, a bow, a flail, a hoe, and several other wooden instruments adorned with gold leaf. The serdab, for its part, held the canopic chest, its interior covered with religious texts. Also present were earthenware vessels still containing the remains of the food offerings they had once held, a life-sized wooden swan, small round or rectangular tables, a box containing perfumes in alabaster jars labeled with their contents, a pair of gilded wooden sandals, and a small board holding a mirror, a beaded diadem, and four gold blades fitted with handles. This board, riddled with woodworm over time, crumbled to dust the moment the excavators touched it.
