= Twelfth Dynasty of Egypt =

Egyptian Middle Kingdom dynasty from 1991 to 1802 BC

- c. 1991 BC–c. 1802 BC
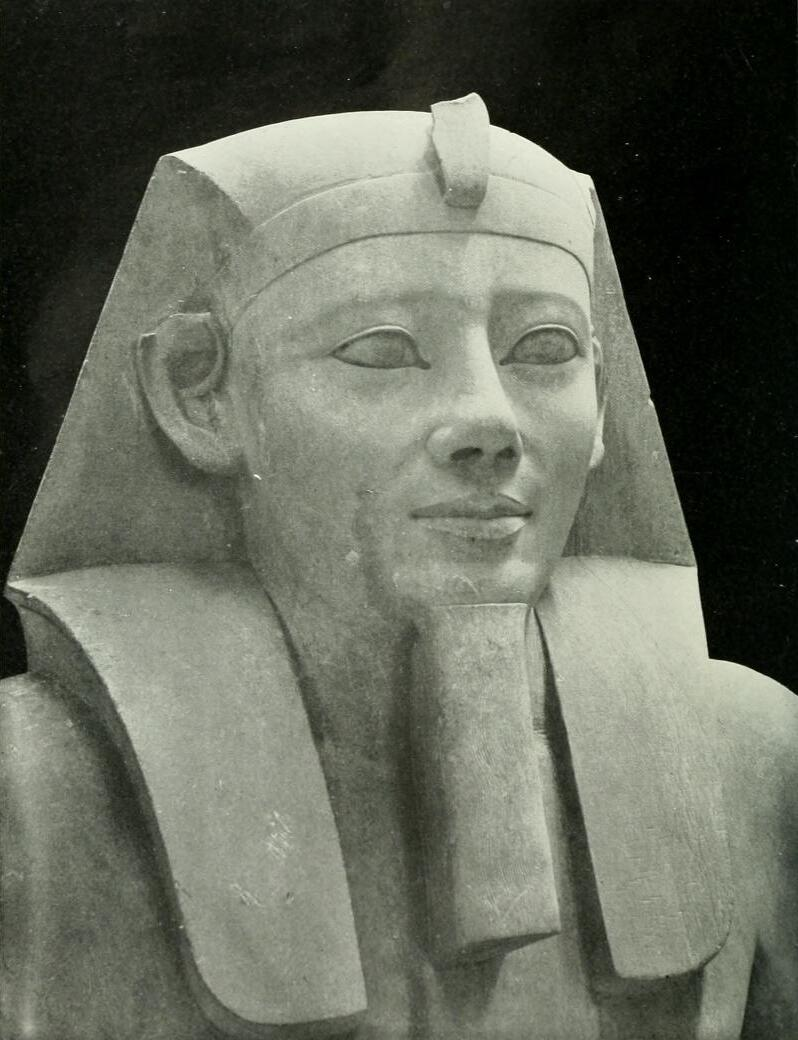
- Statue of pharaoh Senusret I
- Capital: Thebes, Itjtawy
- Common languages: Egyptian
- Religion: ancient Egyptian religion
- Government: Absolute monarchy
- Monarch
  - c. 1991–c. 1962 BC (first): Amenemhat I
  - c. 1806–c. 1802 BC (last): Sobekneferu
- Historical era: Middle Kingdom of Egypt
  - Established: c. 1991 BC
  - Disestablished: c. 1802 BC
Preceded by	Succeeded by
Eleventh Dynasty of Egypt	Thirteenth Dynasty of Egypt

The Twelfth Dynasty of ancient Egypt (Dynasty XII) is a series of rulers reigning from c. 1991–1802 BC (c. 190 years), at what is often considered to be the apex of the Middle Kingdom (Dynasties XI–XIV). The dynasty periodically expanded its territory from the Nile Delta and its valley to the south beyond the second cataract and to the east into Canaan.

The Twelfth Dynasty was marked by relative stability and development. It has a notably well recorded history for the period. Its first pharaoh was Amenemhat I and its final was Sobekneferu.

== History ==
In the view of Egyptologist Frank Yurco:

The XIIth Dynasty (1991–1786 BCE) originated from the Aswan region. As expected, strong Nubian features and dark coloring are seen in their sculpture and relief work. This dynasty ranks as among the greatest, whose fame far outlived its actual tenure on the throne.

The chronology of the Twelfth Dynasty is the most stable of any period before the New Kingdom. The Turin Royal Canon gives 213 years (1991–1778 BC). Manetho stated that it was based in Thebes, but from contemporary records it is clear that the first king of this dynasty, Amenemhat I, moved its capital to a new city named "Amenemhat-itj-tawy" ("Amenemhat the Seizer of the Two Lands"), more simply called, Itjtawy. The location of Itjtawy has not been discovered yet, but it is thought to be near the Fayyum, probably near the royal graveyards at el-Lisht.

The order of its rulers of the Twelfth Dynasty is well known from several sources: two lists recorded at temples in Abydos and one at Saqqara, as well as lists derived from Manetho's work. A recorded date during the reign of Senusret III can be correlated to the Sothic cycle, consequently, many events during this dynasty frequently can be assigned to a specific year. However, scholars now have expressed skepticism in the usefulness of the referred date, due to the fact that location affects observation of the Sothic cycle.

Egypt underwent various developments under the Twelfth Dynasty, including the reorganization of the kingdom's administration and agricultural developments in the Fayyum. The Twelfth Dynasty was also responsible for significant expansion of Egyptian borders, with campaigns pushing into Nubia and the Levant.

The Twelfth Dynasty is often considered the apex of Egypt's Middle Kingdom. The Middle Kingdom spans the Eleventh, Thirteenth, and Fourteenth dynasties, but some scholars only consider the 11th and 12th dynasties to be part of the Middle Kingdom.

== Rulers ==
Dynasty XII Monarchs of Egypt
Nomen (personal name)	Image	Prenomen (throne name)	Horus-name	Reign	Pyramid	Consort(s)	Lifespan
Amenemhat I (Ammenemes I)		Sehetepibre	Wehemmesu	c. 1991 – c. 1962 BC	Pyramid of Amenemhet I	Neferitatjenen	Died c. 1962 BC
Senusret I (Sesostris I)		Kheperkare	Ankhmesut	c. 1962 – c. 1926 BC	Pyramid of Senusret I	Neferu III	Died c. 1926 BC
Amenemhat II (Ammenemes II)		Nubkhaure	Hekenemmaat	c. 1926 – c. 1895 BC	White Pyramid	Senet?	Died c. 1895 BC
Senusret II (Sesostris II)		Khakheperre	Seshemutawy	c. 1895 – c. 1878 BC	Pyramid of Senusret II	Khenemetneferhedjet I Nofret II	Died c. 1878 BC
Senusret III (Sesostris III)		Khakaure	Netjerkheperu	c. 1878 – c. 1839 BC	Pyramid of Senusret III	Neferthenut; Khenemetneferhedjet II; Itakayt	Died c. 1839 BC
Amenemhat III (Ammenemes III)		Nimaatre	Aabau	c. 1839 – c. 1814 BC	Black Pyramid; Pyramid at Hawara	Aat; Khenemetneferhedjet III	Died c. 1814 BC
Amenemhat IV (Ammenemes IV)		Maakherure	Kheperkheperu	c. 1814 – c. 1806 BC	Southern Mazghuna pyramid	Sobekneferu	Died c. 1806 BC
Sobekneferu (Skemiophris)		Sobekkare	Merytre	c. 1806 – c. 1802 BC	North Mazghuna pyramid	N/A	Died c. 1802 BC

Known rulers of the Twelfth Dynasty are as follows:

=== Amenemhat I ===
This dynasty was founded by Amenemhat I, who may have been vizier to the last king of Dynasty XI, Mentuhotep IV. His armies campaigned south as far as the Second Cataract of the Nile and into southern Canaan. As a part of his militaristic expansion of Egypt, Amenemhat I ordered the construction of multiple military forts in Nubia. He also reestablished diplomatic relations with the Canaanite state of Byblos and Hellenic rulers in the Aegean Sea. He was the father of Senusret I.

=== Senusret I ===
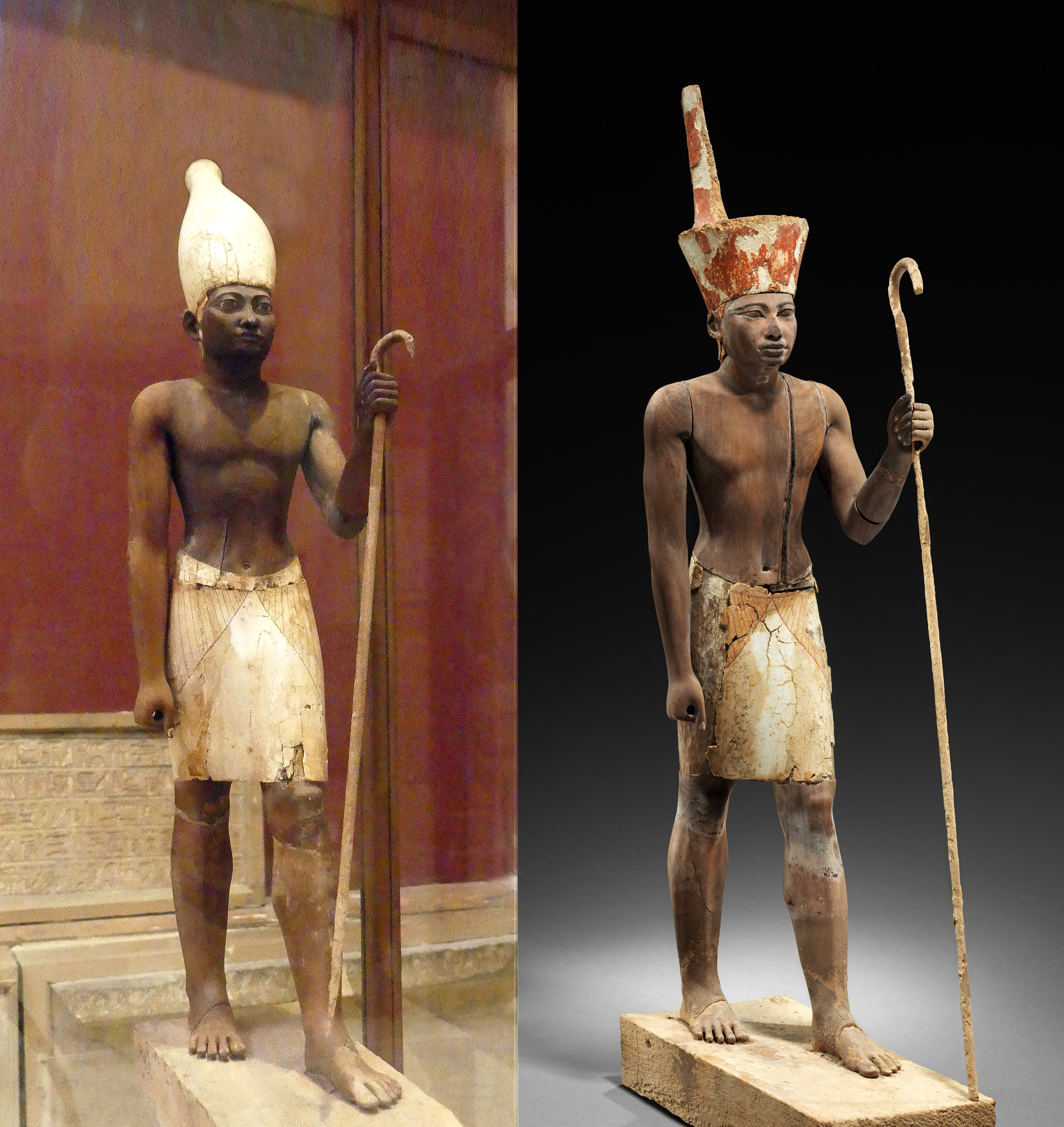
Pair of guardian statuettes, depicting Middle Kingdom pharaohs, presumably Senusret I, Amenemhat II or Senusret II, with the white crown of Upper Egypt (left), the other with the red crown of Lower Egypt. Wood, from el-Lisht, ca. 1919–1885 BCE, 12th dynasty, Middle Kingdom (Egyptian Museum, main floor, room 22, JE44951, and Metropolitan Museum of Art, 14.3.17).

For the first ten years of his reign, Senusret I possibly ruled as a coregent alongside his father, Amenemhat I. He continued his fathers campaigns into Nubia, expanding Egyptian control to the Third Cataract of the Nile. In addition to pursuing militaristic expansion, Senusret I was also responsible for internal growth within Egypt. As king, he initiated a considerable amount of building projects across Egypt, including pyramids in Lisht, a temple at Karnak and oversaw the renovation of the kingdom's major temples.

=== Amenemhat II ===
Unlike his predecessors, Amenemhat II was king during a time of peace. Under his reign, trade boomed with other states in Asia, the Mediterranean, and Africa. He built his mortuary complex near Memphis at Dahshur.

=== Senusret II ===
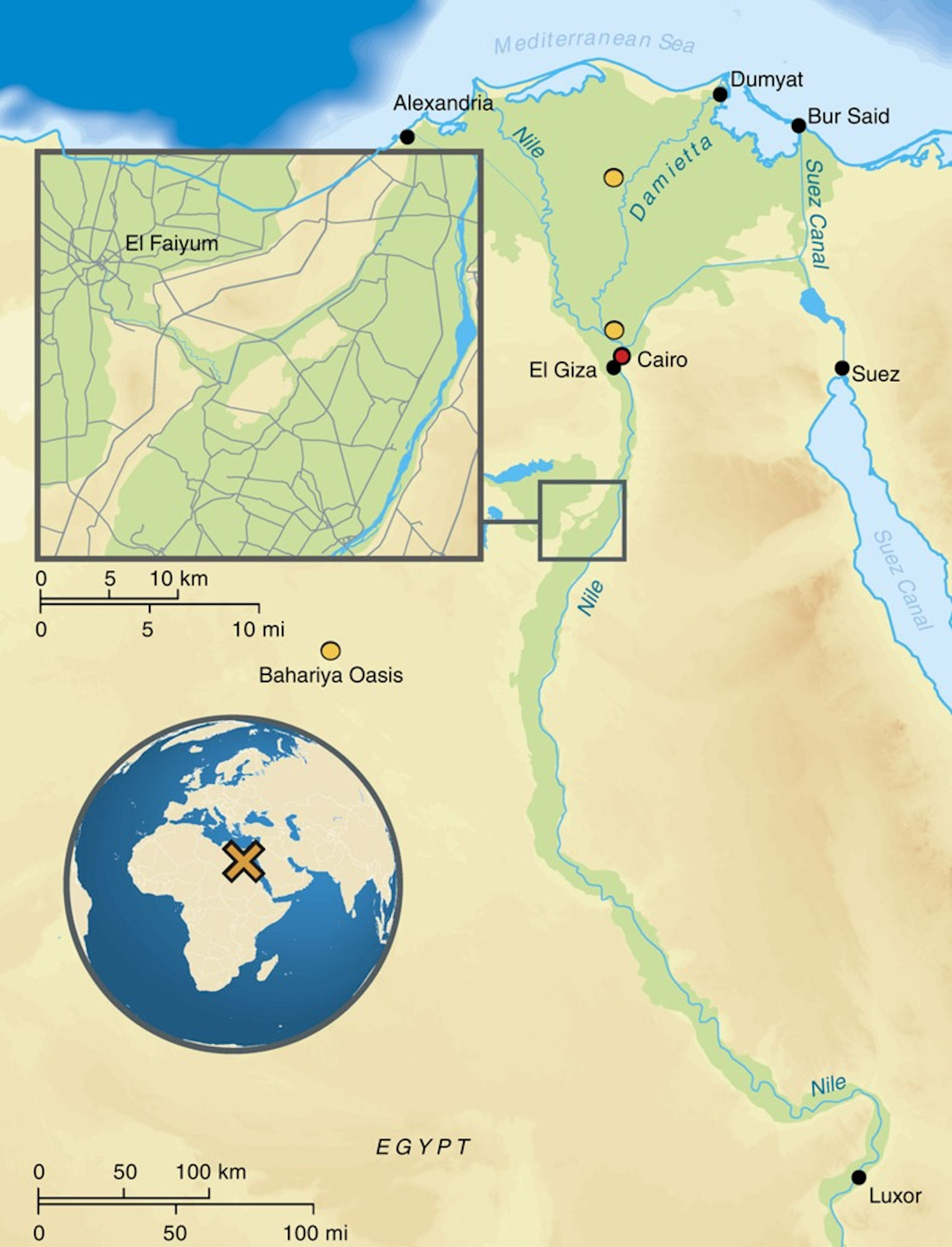
A map showing the north of Egypt, with the Fayyum highlighted in the black square

Senusret II also reigned during a time of peace. He was the first king to develop the Fayyum Basin for agricultural production. This development was complex, requiring the digging of several canals and the draining of a lake in order to maximize the Fayyum's agricultural output. The Middle Kingdom development of the Fayyum later became the basis for the Ptolemaic and Roman efforts that turned the region into the bread basket of the Mediterranean.

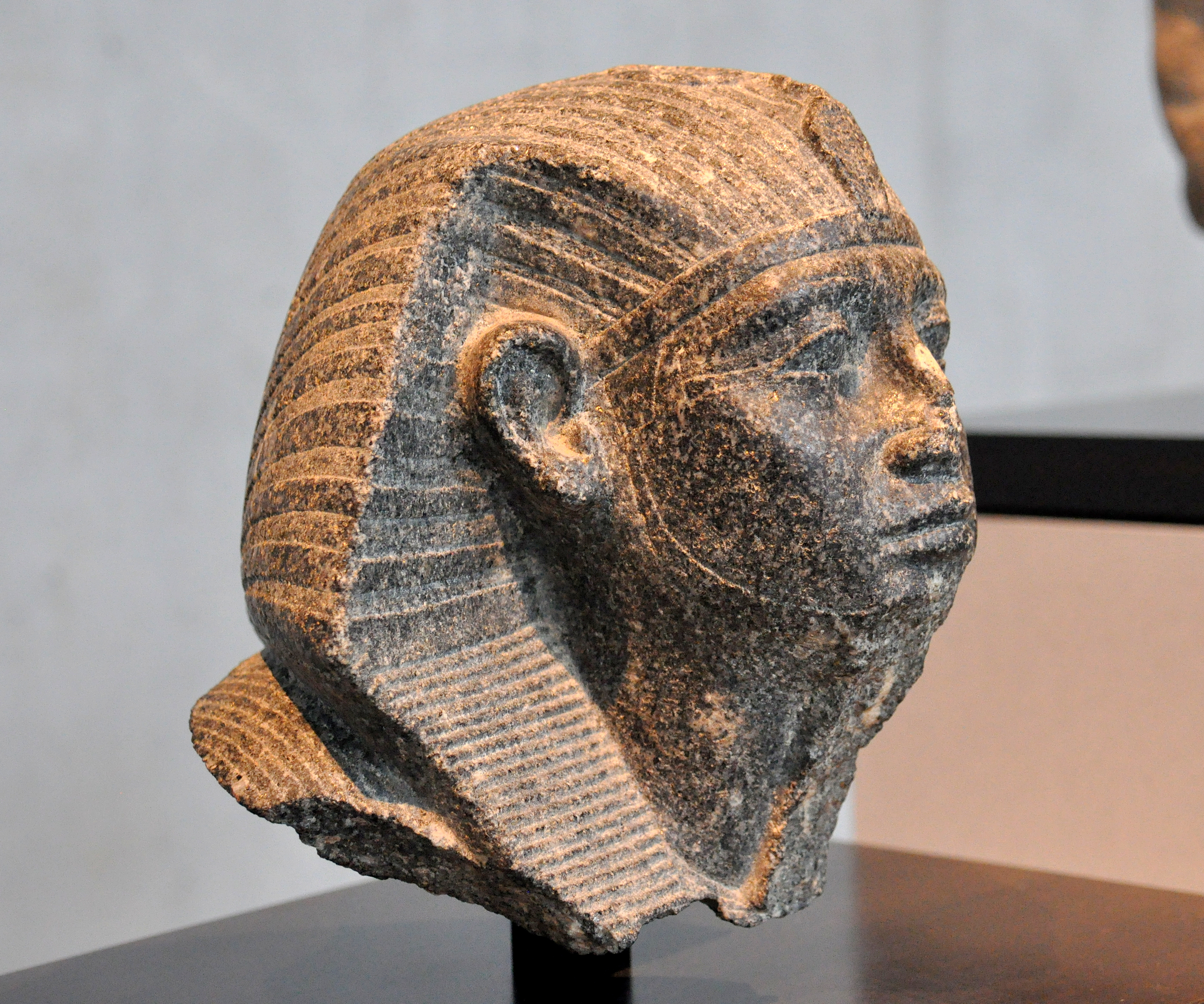
Head of Senusret III with youthful features, 12th Dynasty, c. 1870 BC, State Museum of Egyptian Art, Munich

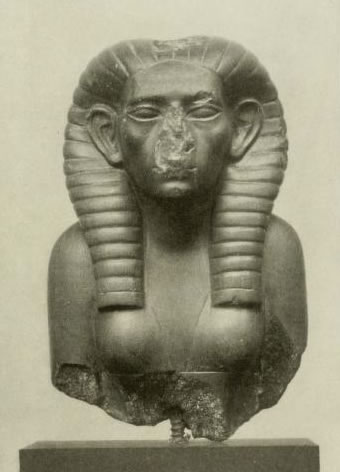
Sobekneferu was the last ruler of the 12th Dynasty

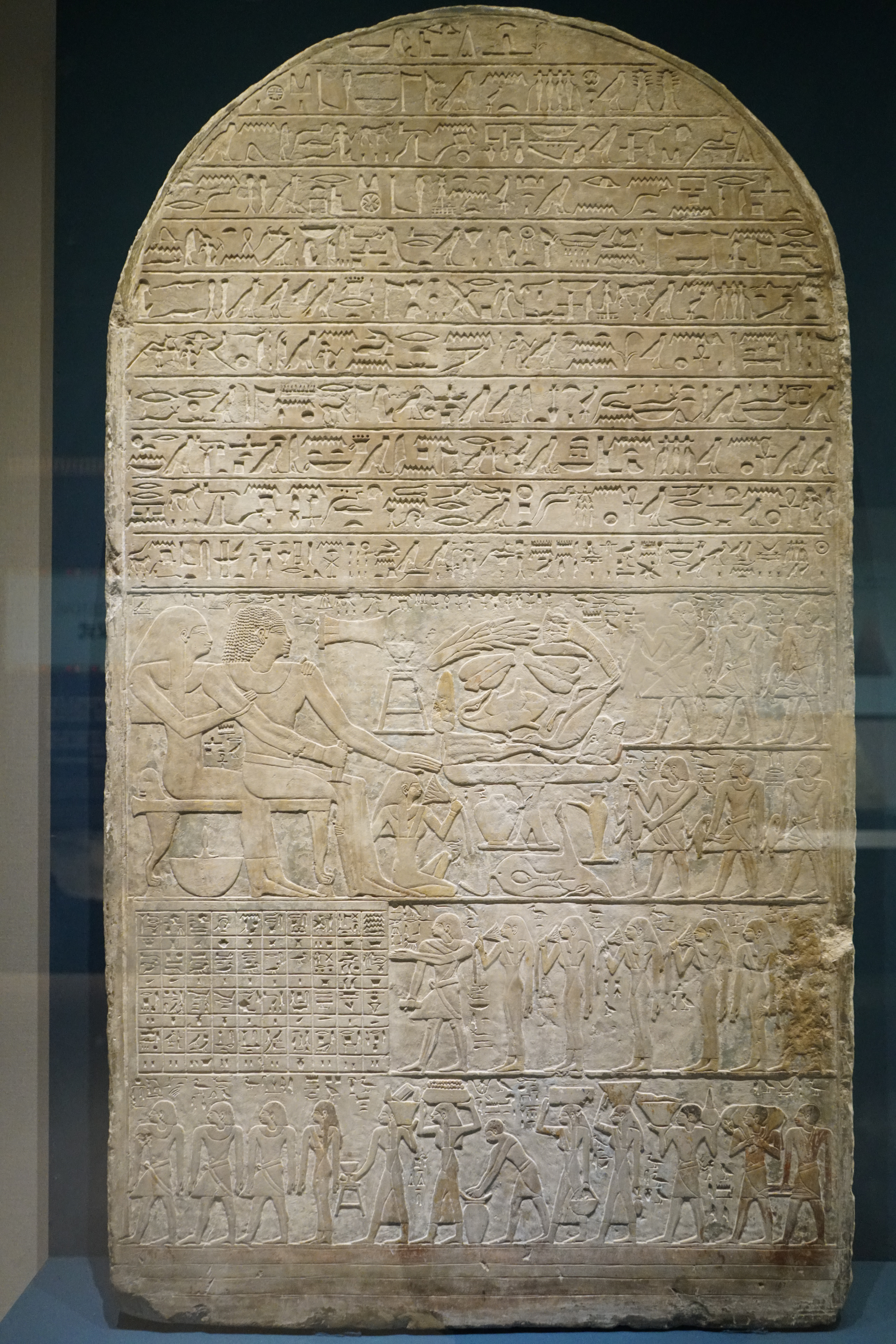
Stele of Abkau dates to the 12th Dynasty

=== Senusret III ===
Finding Nubia had grown restive under the previous rulers, Senusret sent punitive expeditions into that land. As a part of his effort to subdue Nubia, he ordered the construction of several new fortresses as well as the expansion of existing ones along the border with Nubia. He also sent an expedition into the Levant. Senusret III's military career contributed to his prestige during the New Kingdom, as he was regarded as a warrior king and even revered as a god in Nubia. One of Senusret III's significant internal developments was the centralization of administrative power in the kingdom, which replaced the nome system with three large administrative districts that encompassed all of Egypt.

=== Amenemhat III ===
Senusret's successor Amenemhat III reaffirmed his predecessor's foreign policy. However, after Amenemhat, the energies of this dynasty were largely spent, and the growing troubles of government were left to the dynasty's last ruler, Sobekneferu, to resolve. Amenemhat was remembered for the mortuary temple at Hawara that he built.

=== Amenemhat IV ===
Amenemhat IV succeeded his father, Amenemhat III, and ruled for approximately nine years. At the time of his death, Amenemhat IV had no apparent heir, leading to Sobekneferu's ascension to the throne.

=== Sobekneferu ===
Sobekneferu, a daughter of Amenemhat III, was the first known woman to become king of Egypt. She was left with the unresolved governmental issues that are noted as arising during her father's reign when she succeeded Amenemhat IV, thought to be her brother, half brother, or step brother. Upon his death, she became the heir to the throne because her older sister, Neferuptah, who would have been the next in line to rule, died at an early age. Sobekneferu was the last king of the twelfth dynasty. There is no record of her having an heir. She also had a relatively short nearly four-year reign and the next dynasty began with a shift in succession, possibly to unrelated heirs of Amenemhat IV.

== Ancient Egyptian literature refined ==
Several famous works of Egyptian literature originated from the 12th Dynasty. Perhaps the best known work from this period is The Story of Sinuhe, of which papyrus copies dating as late as the New Kingdom have been recovered.

Some of the existing literature pertaining to the 12th Dynasty are propagandistic in nature. The Prophecy of Neferti establishes a revisionist account of history that legitimizes Amenemhat I's rule. Written during the reign of Amenemhat I, described a sage's prophecy given to the 4th Dynasty King Snefru that predicted a destructive civil war. It writes that the sage, Neferti, prophesied that a great king named Ameny (Amenemhat I) would lead a united Egypt out of this tumultuous period. The work also mentions Amenemhat I's mother being from the Elephantine Egyptian nome Ta-Seti. Many scholars in recent years have argued that Amenemhat I's mother was of Nubian origin.

Other known works attributed to the 12th Dynasty include:

- Dispute Between a Man and his Ba
- Complaints of Khakheperre-sonb
- Instructions of Amenemhat
- The Eloquent Peasant

During the Middle Kingdom, under Amenemhat III, textual records show that coerced laborers included conscripts (hsbw), fugitives (tsjw), and royal laborers (hmw-nsw). The Reisner Papyrus and El Lahun papyri depict prisoners being employed in state enterprises. Papyrus Brooklyn 35.1446 also shows forced labor being performed on arable state land. Slaves, from neighbouring locations including Nubia, Syria-Palestine but especially of Levantine origin were grouped in ghetto camps to perform labor for the state where they lived in harsh conditions, often including beating by their masters. The term for "male Asiatic" in ancient Egyptian language became synonymous with "slave".

== Comparison of regnal lists ==
The Twelfth Dynasty is well-recorded across Egyptian king lists, which are in broad agreement on the order of the kings in this dynasty. The surviving Karnak, Abydos and Saqqara king lists, all from the New Kingdom of Egypt, provide a list of kings of this dynasty, though the Abydos list omits Sobekneferu. The Turin King List originally provided individual reign lengths, but is now in a fragmentary state and some information is lost, though the summation of years for this dynasty still survives. Manetho's now-lost work Aegyptiaca also provided individual reign lengths, however later Epitomes of the work were misunderstood by various writers who conflated multiple kings into a single figure, failed to understand the number of kings in this dynasty and also placed Amenemhat I separately from the rest of the dynasty.

Historical Pharaoh	Karnak King List	Abydos King List	Saqqara Tablet	Turin King List	Manetho	Reign Length	
Historical Pharaoh	Karnak King List	Abydos King List	Saqqara Tablet	Turin King List	Manetho	Turin List	Manetho
Amenemhat I	Sehotepibre	Sehetepibre	Sehetepibre	[Sehote]pib[re]	Ammenemes	29 years	16 years
Senusret I	Kheperkare	Kheperkare	Kheperkare	[Kheper]ka[re]	Sesonkhosis	45 years	46 years
Amenemhat II	Nebukare	Nubkaure	Nubkaure	Name lost	Ammanemes	30+ years	38 years
Senusret II	Name lost	Khakheperre	Khakheperre	Name lost	Sesostris	19 years	48 years
Senusret III	Khakare	Khakaure	Khakhaure	Name lost	Lakhares	30+ years	8 years
Amenemhat III	Name lost	Nimaatre	Nimaatre	Name lost	Ammeres	40+ years	8 years
Amenemhat IV	Maakherure	Maakherure	Maakherure	Maakherure	Ammenemes	9 years, 3 months and 27 days	8 years
Sobekneferu	Sobekneferu	Omitted	Kasobekre	Neferusobekre	Skemiophris	3 years, 10 months, 24 days	4 years
						213 years, 1 month and 17 days	176 years

== See also ==
- Execration texts
- History of Ancient Egypt
- Twelfth Dynasty of Egypt family tree

Preceded by Eleventh Dynasty	Dynasty of Egypt c. 1991 BC − c. 1802 BC	Succeeded by Thirteenth Dynasty
