= Khnumhotep =

Khnumhotep in hieroglyphs
E10 W9 Htp t p
(Khnum hotep)
ẖnmw-ḥtp
Khnum is pleased

Khnumhotep (alt. Khnumhotpe, Khnemhotpe) is an ancient Egyptian personal theophoric name which may refer to:

- Khnumhotep, an Overseer of the Manicurists under pharaoh Nyuserre (5th Dynasty), famous for his tomb shared with Niankhkhnum
- Khnumhotep I, a nomarch under pharaoh Amenemhat I (12th Dynasty)
- Khnumhotep II, a nomarch under pharaoh Amenemhat II and Senusret II (12th Dynasty), and grandson of Khnumhotep I
- Khnumhotep III, a vizier under pharaohs Senusret II and Senusret III (12th Dynasty), and son of Khnumhotep II
- Khnumhotep IV, a nomarch, son and successor of Khnumhotep II and brother of Khnumhotep III
