= Wadjetrenput =

Wadjetrenput was an ancient Egyptian official with the title of a high steward. He was in office under the ruling queen Hatshepsut (ruled about 1473 to 1458). Wadjetrenput is known from several inscriptions, but none of them are dated, making it hard to provide an exact chronological position for the high official within the reign of the queen. He appears on an ostracon found at Deir el-Bahari also naming the official Senenmut. The latter is well known from the reign of the queen, providing evidence that he also lived in her times. He appears in a rock inscription in southern Egypt, near Aswan. The inscription mentions Hatshepsut and king Thutmose III, providing evidence that the queen sent him on mission to quarry stones (the region around Aswan is famous for its stone quarries). On so called name stones he also appears with the title overseer of works in the Amun temple.
