= Khnumhotep III =

Egyptian high steward and vizier

- Vizier of Egypt; High steward
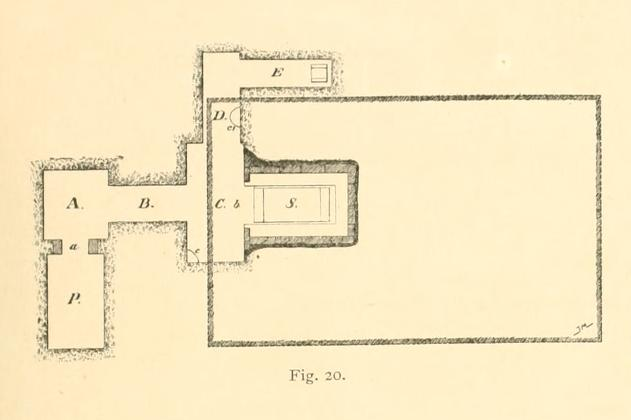
- Plan of Khnumhotep's tomb at Dahshur
Egyptian name
E10 W9 Htp t pKhnumhotep
ẖnmw-ḥtp
"Khnum is pleased"
- Dynasty: 12th Dynasty
- Pharaoh: Senusret II, Senusret III
- Burial: Mastaba at Dahshur
- Father: Khnumhotep II

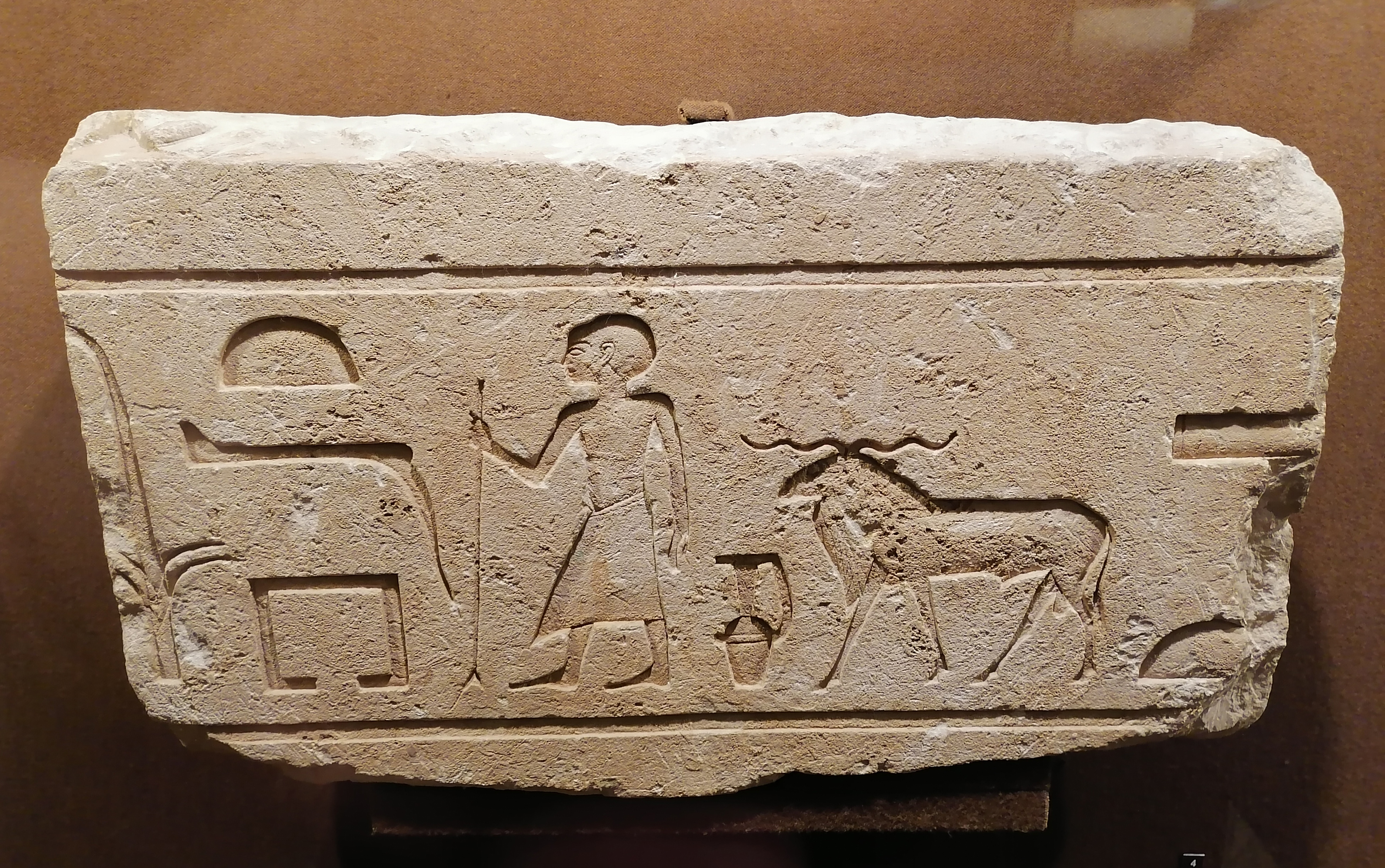
Relief block from Khnumhotep's mastaba

Khnumhotep III (sometimes simply vizier Khnumhotep) was an ancient Egyptian high steward and vizier of the 12th Dynasty.

== Biography ==
The vizier Khnumhotep is known from inscriptions (1) in the tomb of his father, (2) from a stela found at the Red Sea, and (3) his mastaba at Dahshur.

=== Reign of Senusret II ===
Khnumhotep was the son of the local governor Khnumhotep II, known from his tomb at Beni Hasan (tomb BH3). Khnumhotep was promoted as a young man, under Senusret II to the royal court and was sent on several missions, one of them to the Red Sea, another one to Byblos.

=== Reign of Senusret III ===
During the reign of Senusret III, Khnumhotep III built his mastaba and became high steward and finally vizier.

== Burial ==
=== Mastaba Tomb ===
At Dahshur, he built his mastaba tomb at the necropolis attached to the Pyramid Complex of Senusret III. It was solid, without inner rooms, and was built of mudbricks covered with fine limestone while the outside was decorated with a palace façade and with the biographical inscription. The tomb has an area of c. 40 square metres (430 sq ft) and is relatively small if compared to some neighbouring tombs belonged to other viziers that are around 150 square metres (1,600 sq ft); this fact, in addition to his ranking titles reported in the tomb, suggests that Khnumhotep likely ordered this tomb early in his career, and that he became vizier in his very late life and didn't have enough time for building a mastaba more appropriate to his newly achieved high rank.

The tomb was first excavated around 1894 by Jacques de Morgan who found several inscriptions as well as Khnumhotep's remains from which he estimated that the vizier should have been in his early sixties at the time of his death. New excavations after 2000 found several further biographical inscriptions, including those mentioning an expedition to Byblos and Ullaza.
