= Khnumhotep II =

Egyptian nomarch

- Nomarch of the 16th nome of Upper Egypt
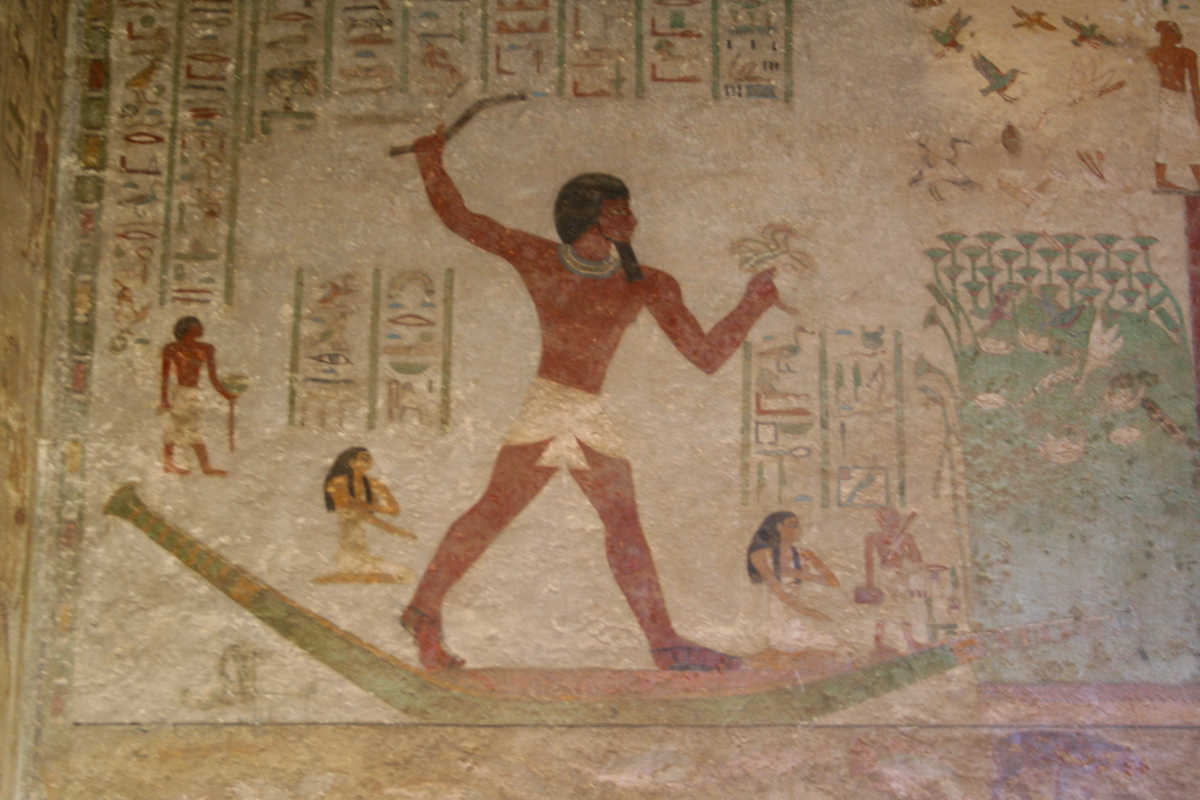
- Khnumhotep II depicted while hunting waterfowl in the marshes
Egyptian name
E10 W9 Htp t p
- Predecessor: Nakht or Netjernakht
- Successor: Khnumhotep IV
- Dynasty: 12th Dynasty
- Pharaoh: Amenemhat II, Senusret II
- Burial: Beni Hasan tomb 3 (BH3)
- Spouse: Khety; Tjat
- Father: Neheri
- Mother: Baqet
- Children: Nakht, Khnumhotep IV, Khnumhotep III, Neheri, and others

Khnumhotep II (ẖnmw-ḥtp, "Khnum is pleased") was an ancient Egyptian Great Chief of the Oryx nome (the 16th nome of Upper Egypt) during the reign of pharaohs Amenemhat II and Senusret II of the 12th Dynasty, Middle Kingdom (20th century BCE). He is well known for his tomb at Beni Hasan and its decorations.

== Biography and family ==
He was a member of a powerful family of nomarchs and officials which was likely founded by his grandfather Khnumhotep I and housed in Men'at Khufu. Khnumhotep II held many titles such as hereditary prince and count, foremost of actions, royal sealer, sole friend, member of the elite, overlord of Nekheb, and also overseer of the Eastern Desert, a position which he held from Year 19 of Amenemhat II until at least Year 6 of Senusret II i.e. the date which appears in Khnumhotep's tomb. Like most nomarchs of the time he also held some priestly charges.

Khnumhotep's biography is recorded on the inner doorway of his rock-cut tomb in the eastern cliffs above Beni Hasan, and he visited both Byblos and Punt.

His predecessor as nomarch was probably his relative Netjernakht, and Khnumhotep honored him by building his tomb. His mother was Baqet while his father was an official named Neheri. Khnumhotep had two wives, the main of them was Khety, herself a daughter of the unnamed nomarch of the neighbouring 17th nome with Hardai as capital. Like her husband, Khety held a remarkable number of titles such as daughter of a governor, king's acquaintance, foremost of actions, lady of the house, and was also a priestess of Hathor and Pakhet. Khnumhotep's secondary wife was Tjat who held few, modest titles such as sealer, lady of the house and one who knows her lord; she is the only known female sealer at the court of a local governor. Those peculiarities and the fact that both consorts appears several times in Khnumhotep's tomb suggests that the one between him and Khety was likely a politically arranged marriage while Tjat could have been his true love who was appointed sealer by him in order to have her closer.

From his two consorts, Khnumhotep II had several children:

- Nakht inherited his maternal grandfather's charge of nomarch at Hardai
- Khnumhotep IV, followed his father as nomarch of the 16th nome, He appears in the mural on the eastern wall of his father's tomb.
- Khnumhotep III entered to the royal court where he managed to become high steward and later vizier
- Neheri was buried in a small tomb at Beni Hasan where a stela of him was found
- another son is known for being a "mayor" in a contiguous nome.

For more about Khnumhotep's genealogy, see "Nomarchs of the Oryx nome".

== The tomb BH3 ==
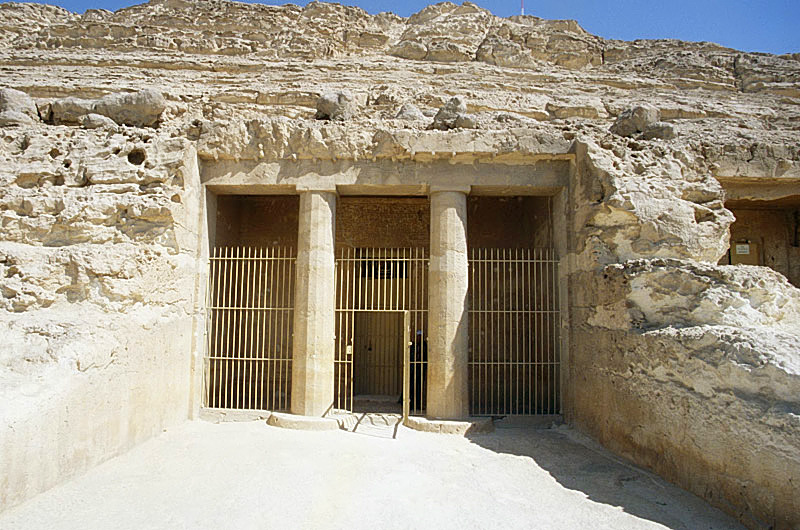
Exterior of the Tomb BH3

Khnumhotep II is buried in Beni Hasan in the rock-cut Tomb 3 (BH3), one of the most notable of the whole necropolis. In ancient times, the tomb would have been approached via a path that was distinguishable by dark brown boulders on either side; the path extended from the open outer court down the hill to the edge of the cultivated land.

=== Overview ===
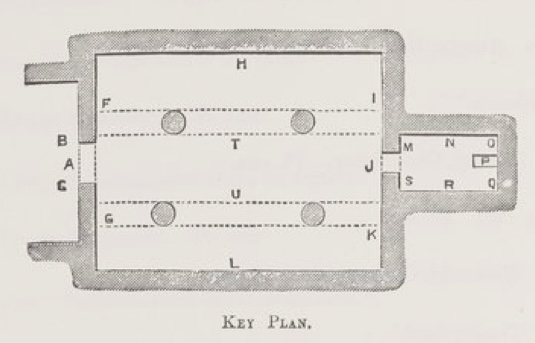

The tomb is fronted by a columned portico and a small courtyard; the courtyard would have been surrounded by mud-brick walls. The small columned portico is on the west side of the courtyard, directly in front of the tomb entrance. The ceiling of the portico is curved similar to the shape of a segmented barrel. The rock around the doorway leading inside the tomb to the chapel was smoothed and flattened, on which a fourteen line inscription is giving the list of the festal days for the services of funeral offerings, called percheru, along with the name and titles of Khnumhotep II. The floor of the main chamber (also referred to as the chapel) is sunk into the ground below the level of the open outer court and is descended into by three steps. The chapel is the main chamber cut straight back into the cliff almost symmetrical with 4 columns and two large shafts (that lead to burial chambers) are cut into the floor. These four main columns support a ceiling that is divided by three segmented barrel shapes. These vaults are painted in a pattern that may be referencing a tent. The only light for this chamber would have come from the doorway to the portico and originally a door, between the portico and the chamber, could have been used to close the tomb to the outdoor elements. Percy Newberry notes that the only remain from the inward swinging door is the pivot-hole. On the doorjambs are prayers to Osiris and Anubis above a seated Khnumhotep II who is facing inward. At the back of this main room (east wall) is a small rectangular shrine approached by a step about 13 centimetres (5.1 in) high. Newberry mentions that from his survey of the tomb there was a statue here of a seated Khnumhotep II, but the entire statue had been cut away and only a portion of the seat remains.
On the wall are also depicted Khnumhotep's most notable officials and employees at his local court, which somewhat resemble a downscaled version of the royal court with a local treasurer and many stewards and overseers.

=== Exterior ===
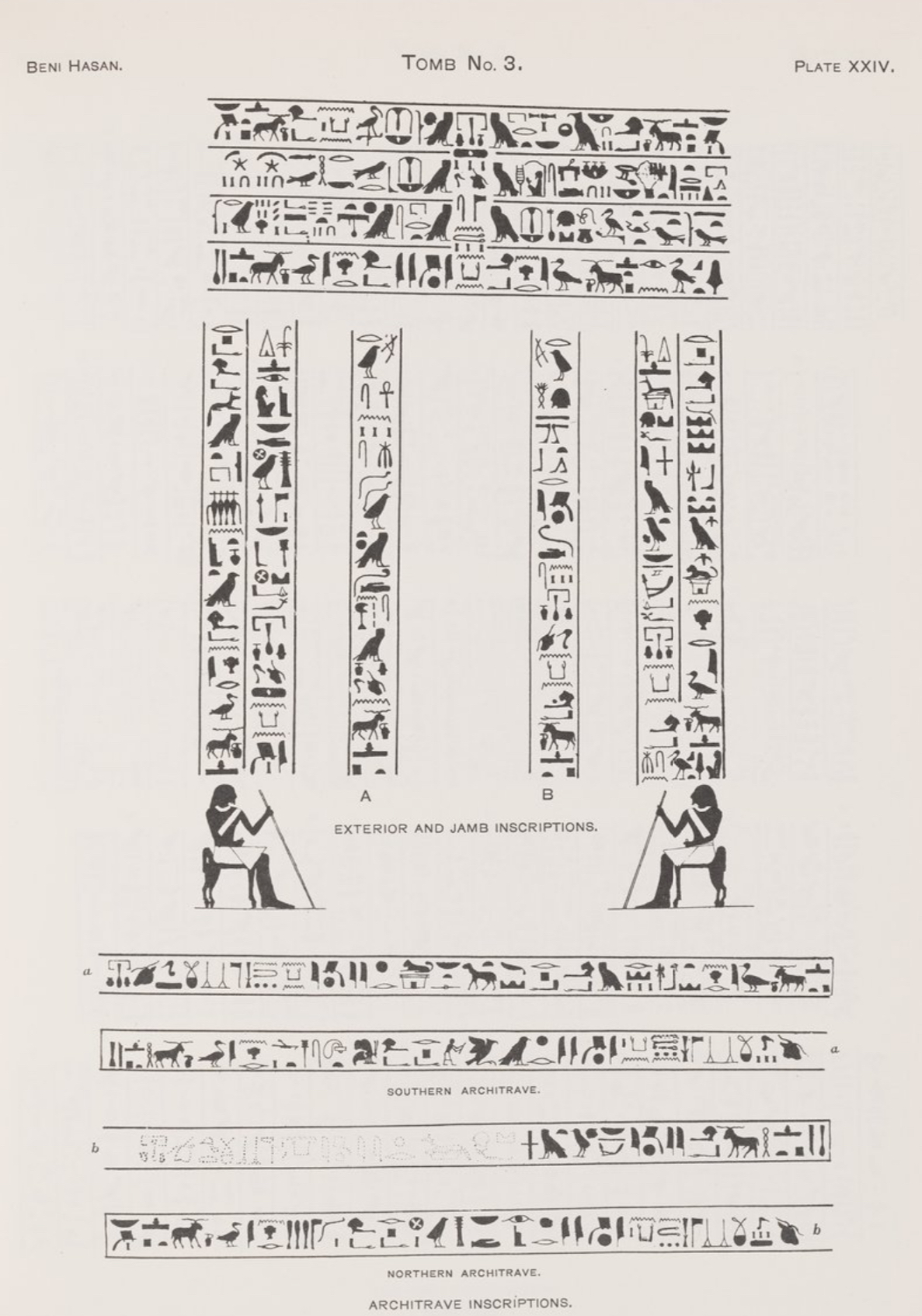

=== Great inscription ===
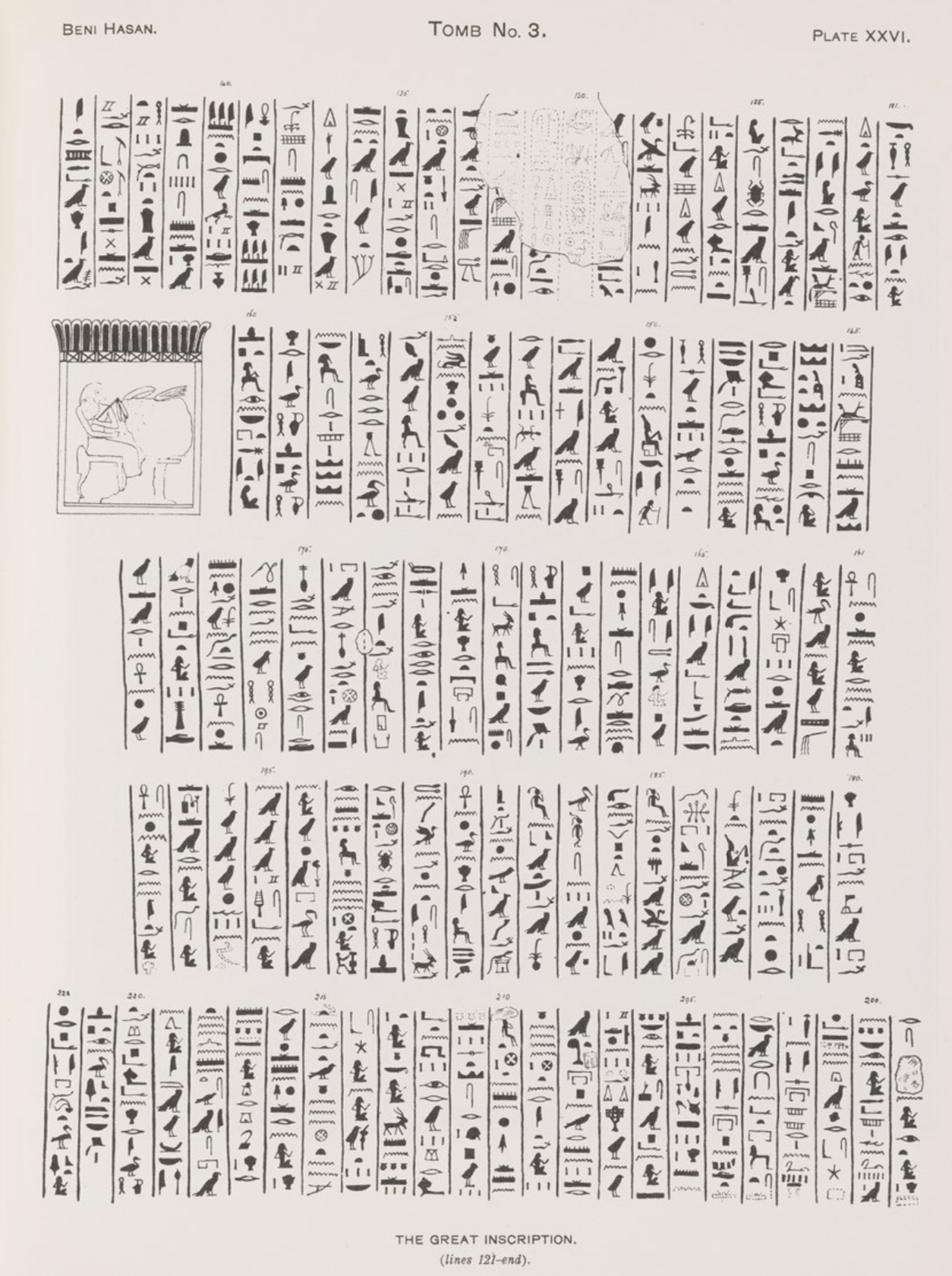
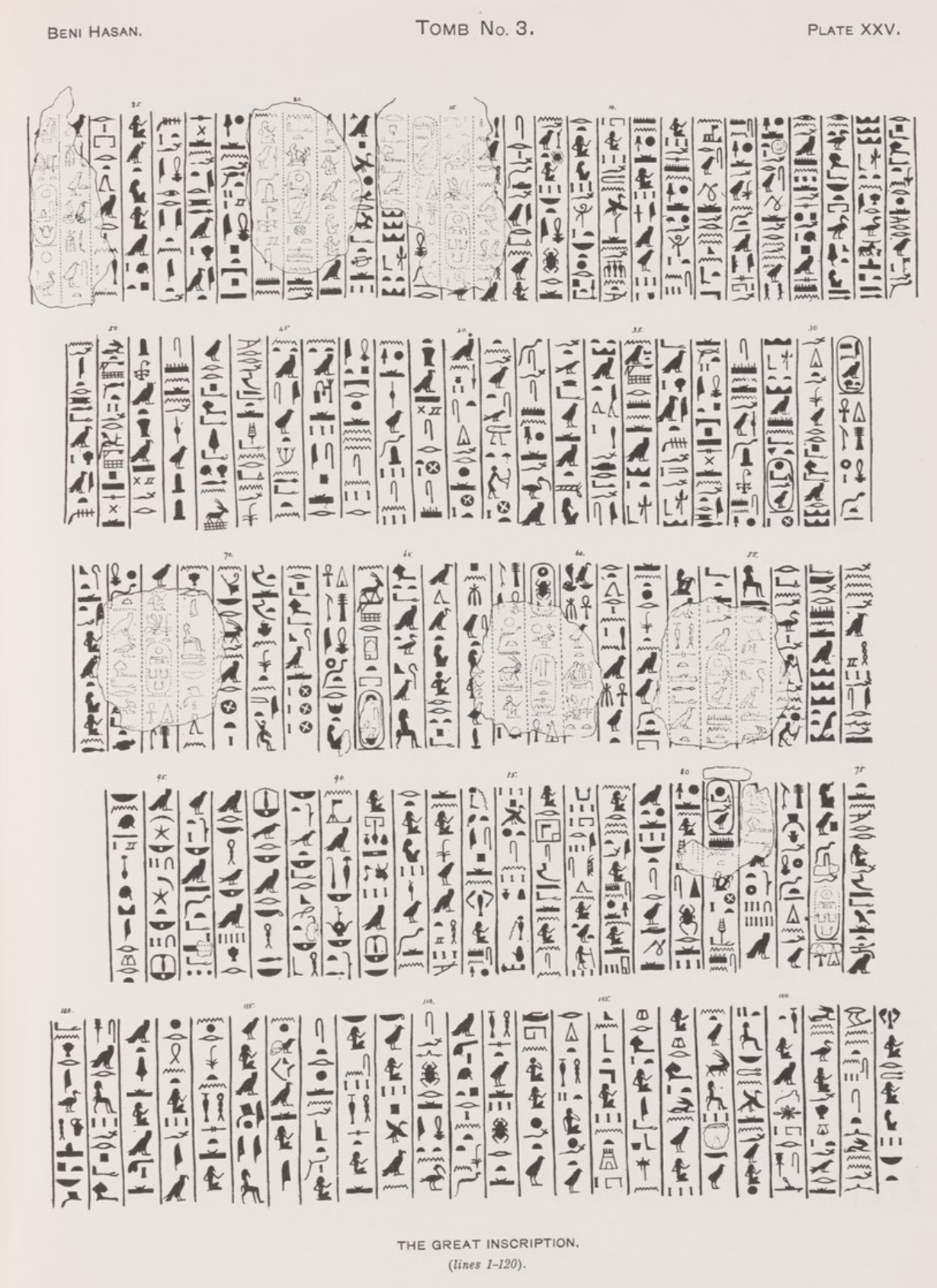
Great inscription of tomb BH3

Incised upon the dado and runs round the walls beneath the paintings of the main chamber.

It contains an autobiography of the deceased; it begins to the left of the entrance to the shrine and runs counterclockwise around the walls of the main chamber, ending to the right of the doorway leading to the shrine. The main types of information included are about the actions Khnumhotep II performed during his lifetime, his family and their lives, as well as the close relationship of his family to the royal house, Khnumhotep's excellent character, and his request to visitors that offerings are made to him.

=== West wall ===
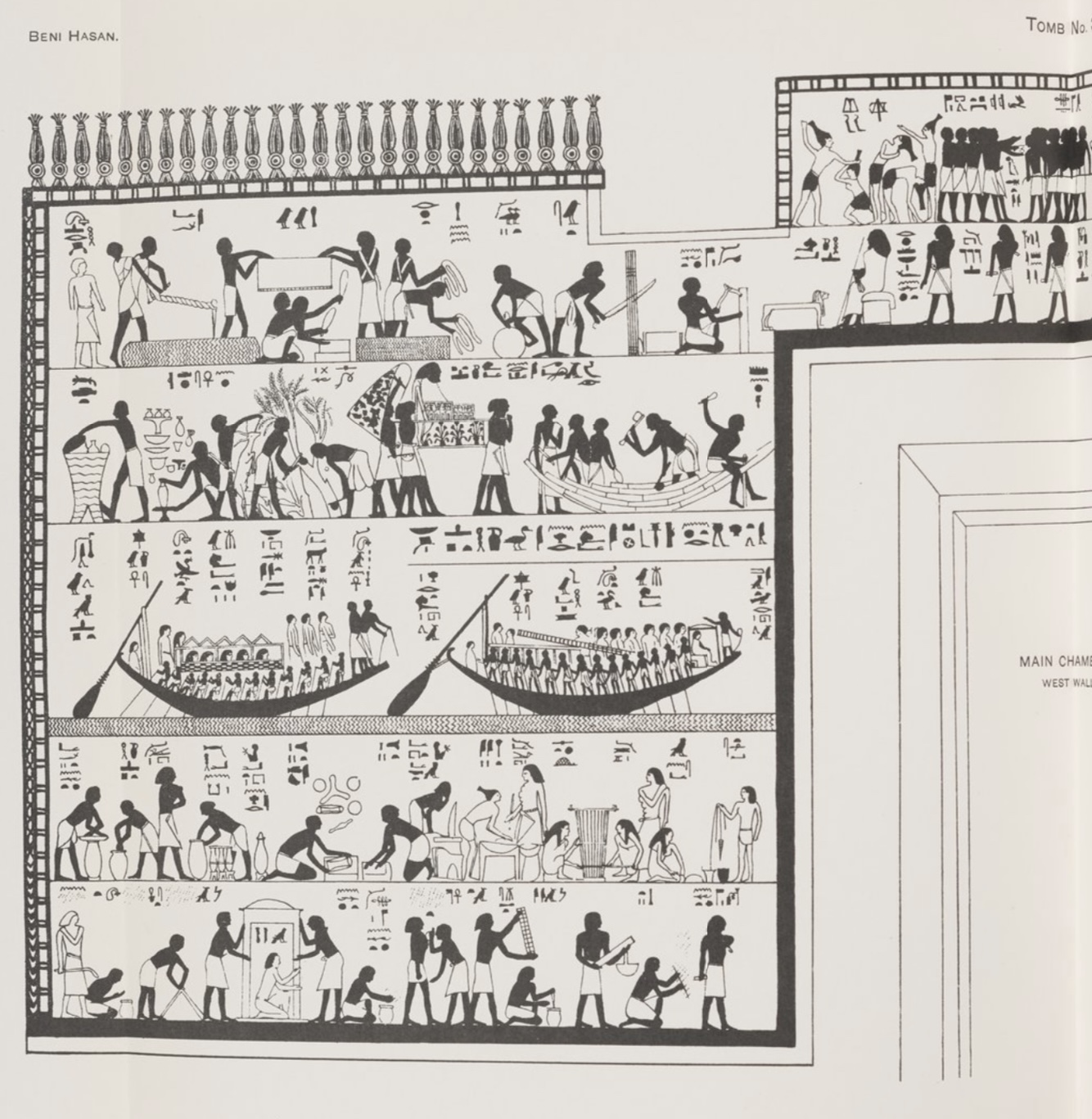
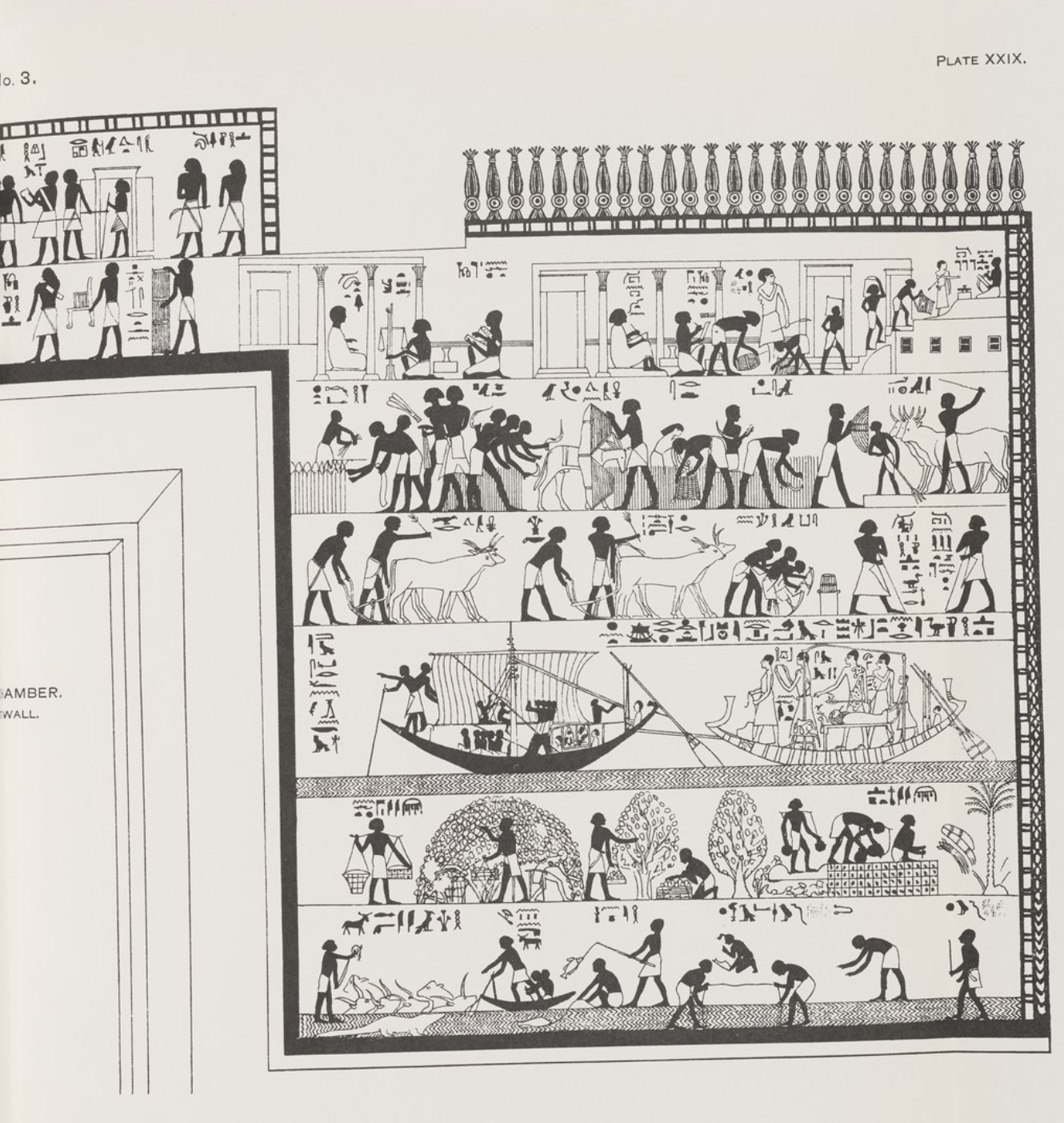
West wall of tomb BH3

On the west wall of the chamber are scenes showing mainly the preparations for the funeral and the resurrection of the deceased. This is exemplified by the boat voyages making a connection between Khnumhotep II and the god Osiris. The orientation of the boats within the tomb literally has them travel south to Abydos (right of the entrance) and north to return (left of the entrance). The wall collectively ensures the tomb owner of rebirth in the afterlife where he will be sustained through cult activities.

=== North wall ===
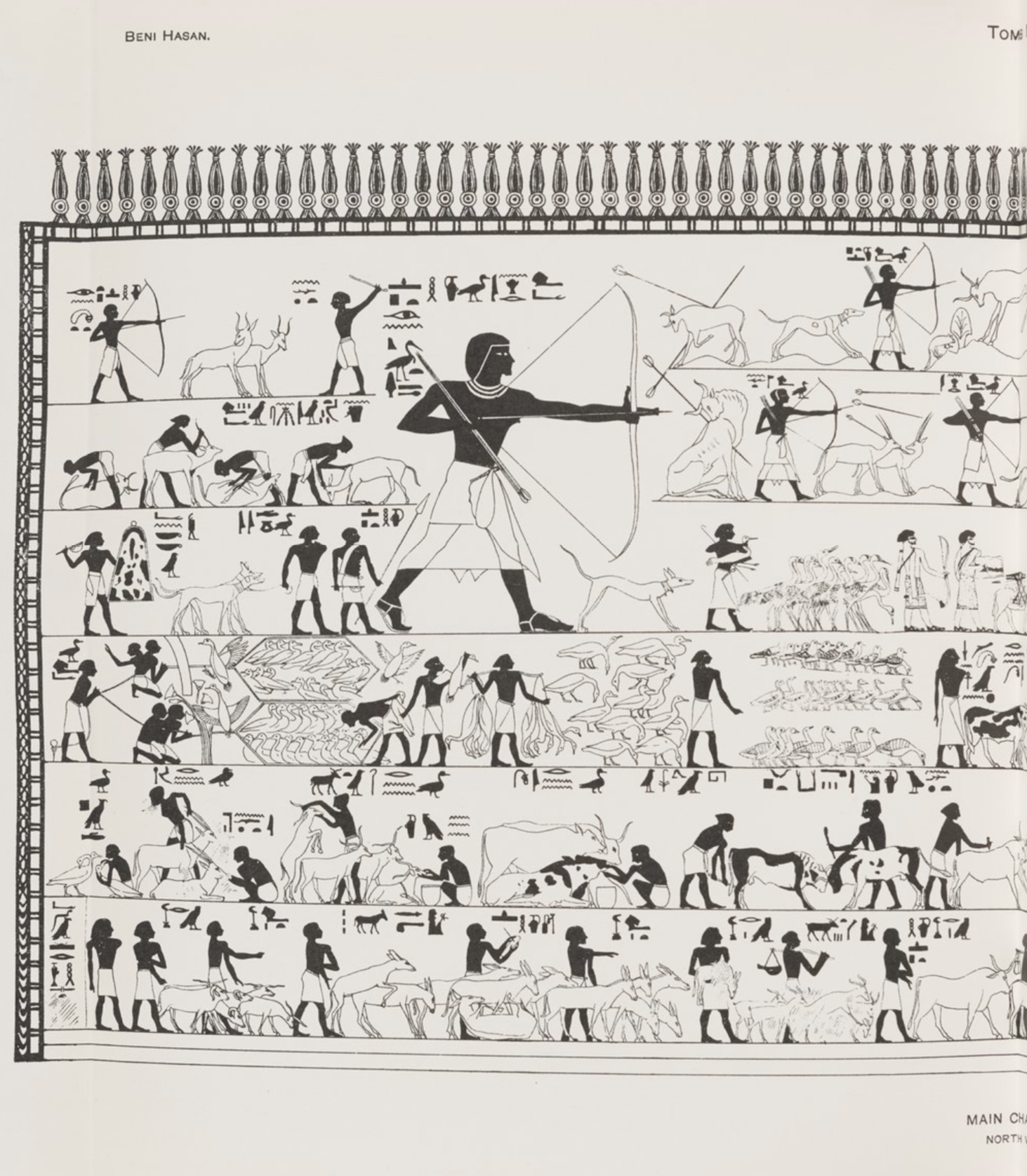
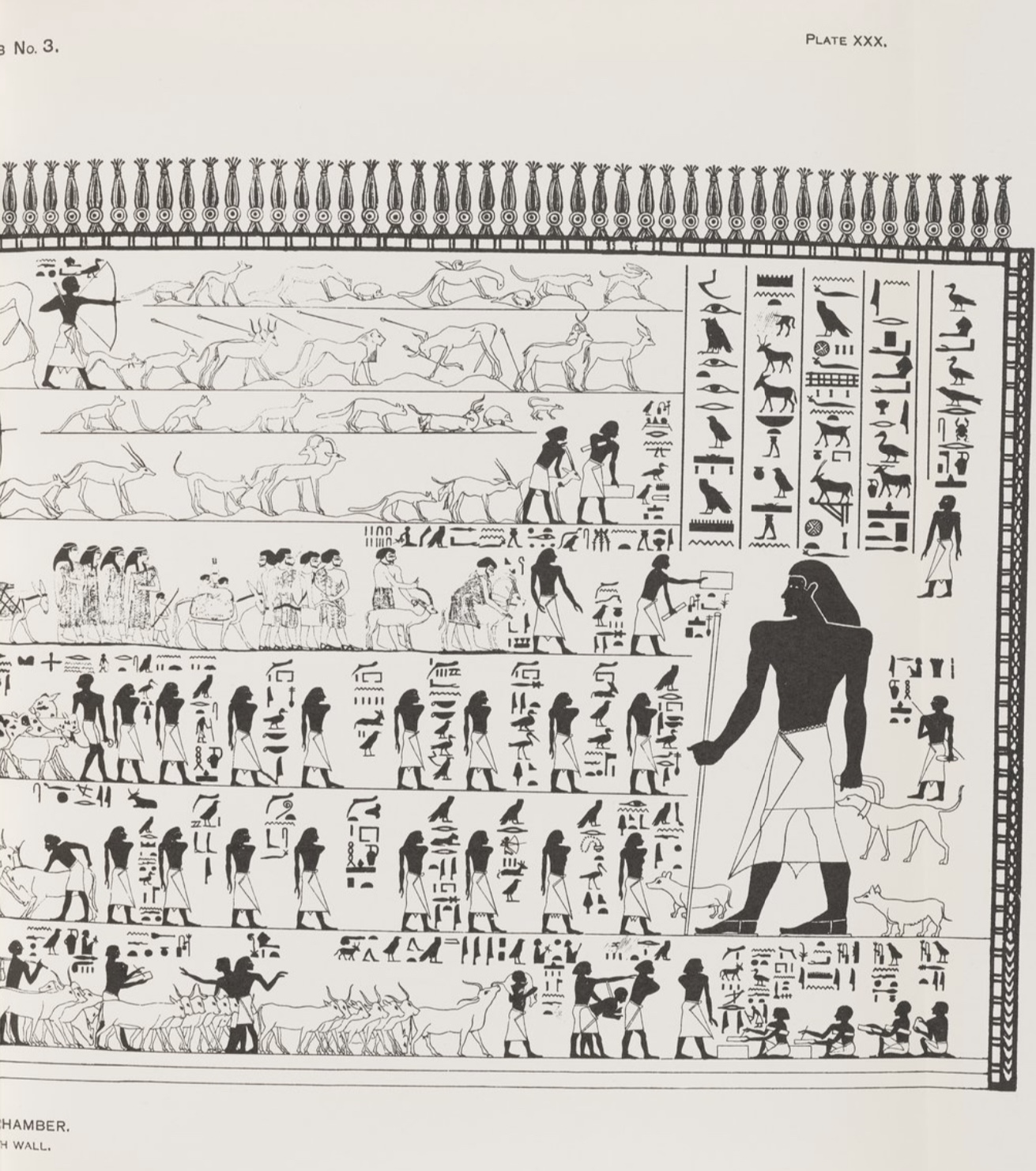
North wall of tomb BH3

On the eastern end of the north wall there is a large-scale standing figure of Khnumhotep II receiving offerings primarily of several types of animals and birds.

The west end of the wall has another large-scale figure of Khnumhotep II only here he is facing right and using a bow to hunt in the desert which is on the edge of the Egyptian world, the boundary between order (maat) and chaos. It has been interpreted that in this scene Khnumhotep II is assuming the role of the king dominating over the chaotic power of the desert.

=== East wall ===
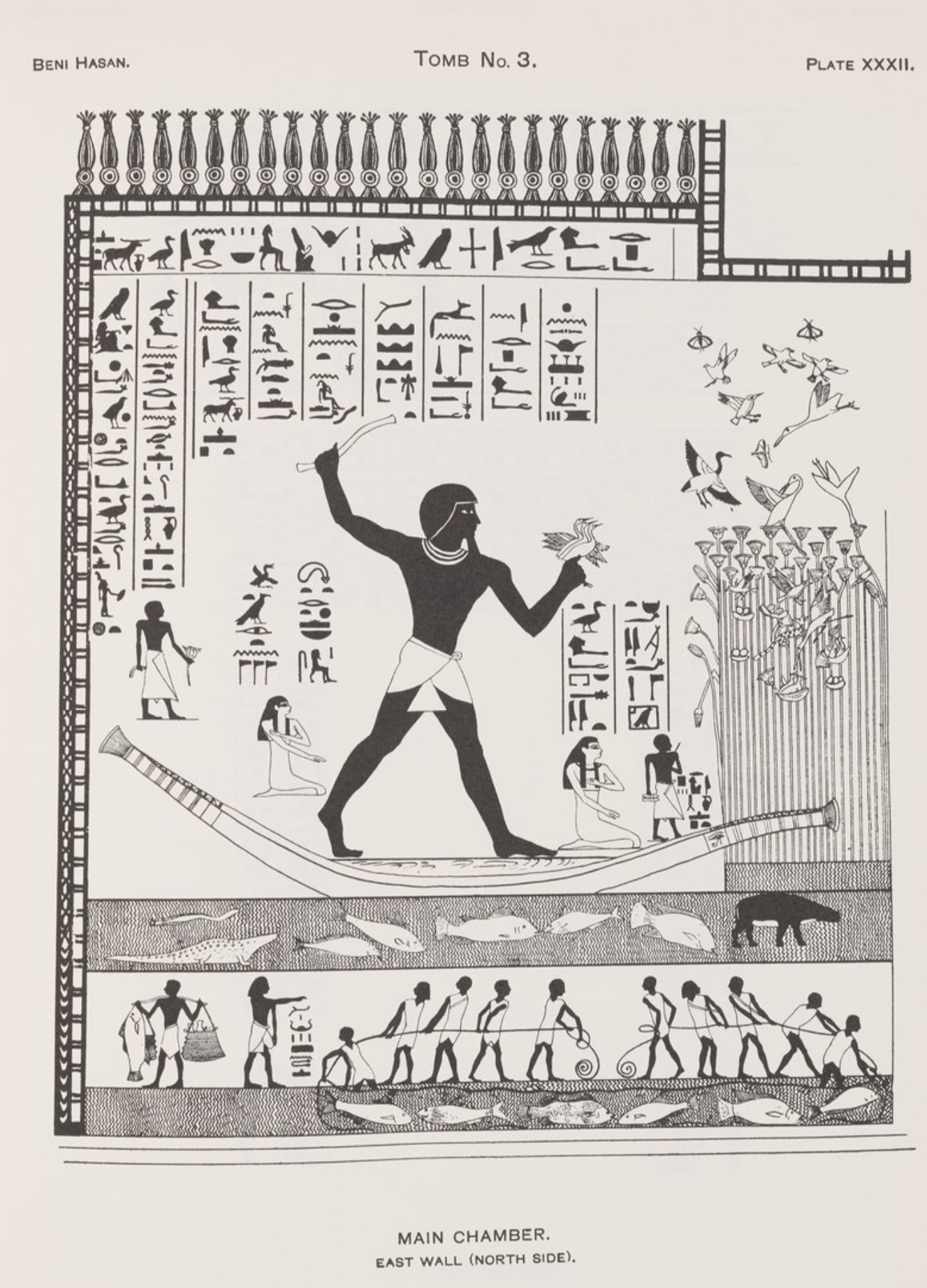
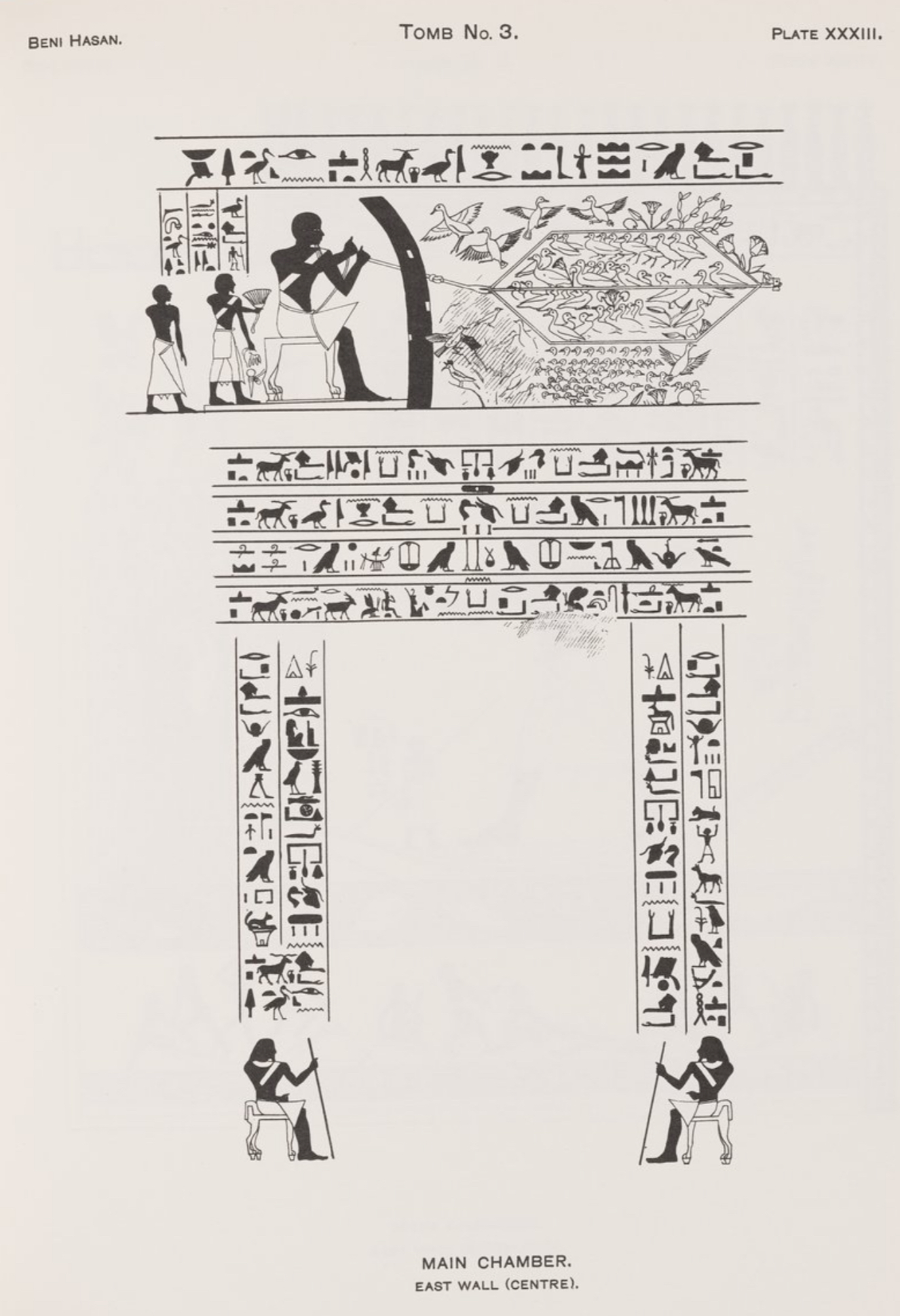
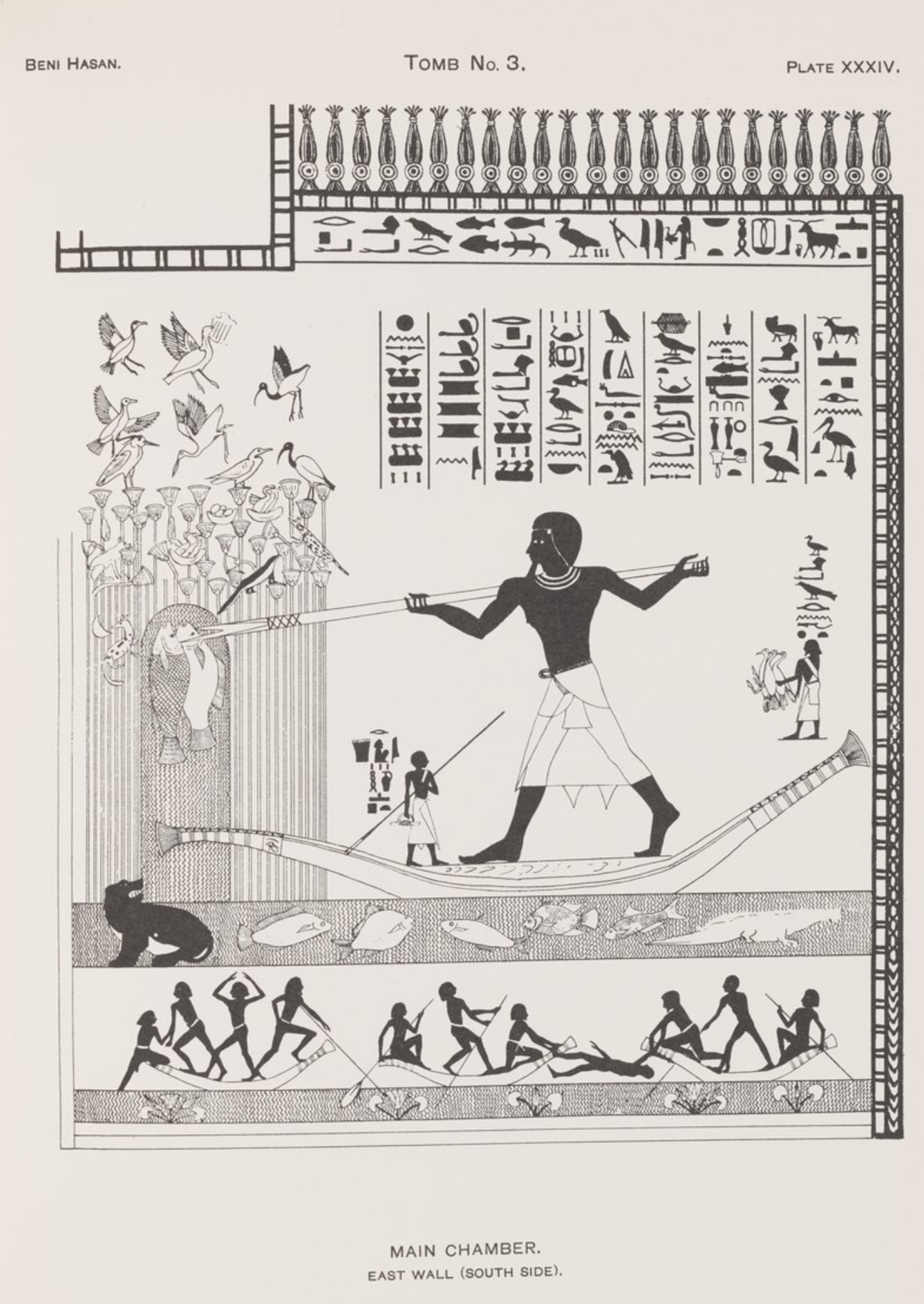
East wall of tomb BH3

The east wall houses the entrance to the shrine, as well as two large depictions of Khnumhotep II hunting in the marshes, one on the north side and the other on the south side. To the south he is harpooning two fishes and to the north he is fowling with a throwing stick. These hunting in the marshes scenes help protect the deceased in the afterlife as well as guarantee his rebirth through connotations of sexuality. Beneath him, north of the door, there are pictures of several people fishing and beneath him on the south side are representations of fighting boatmen. Collectively this wall represents the perpetual renewal of Khnumhotep II.

=== South wall ===
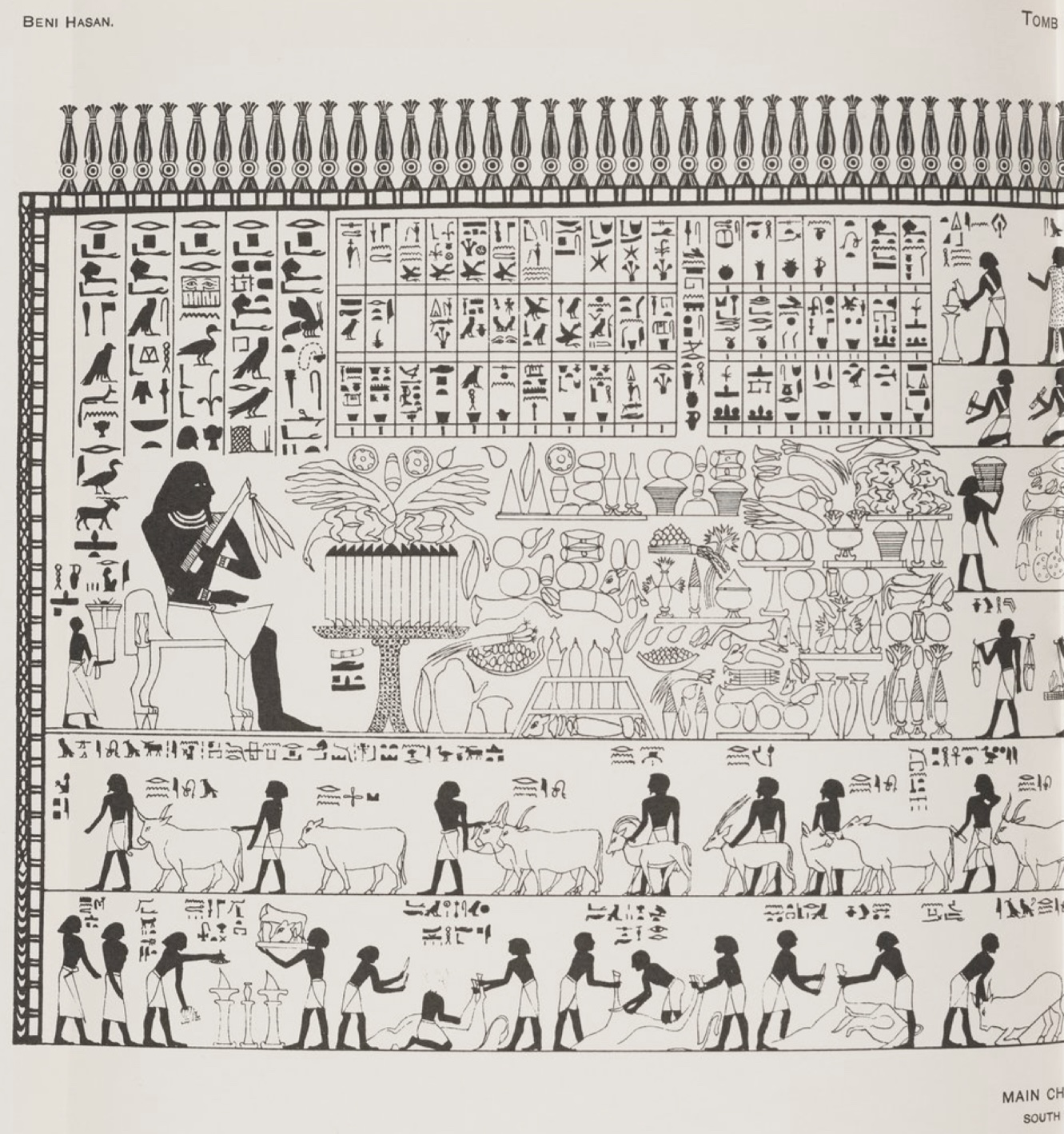
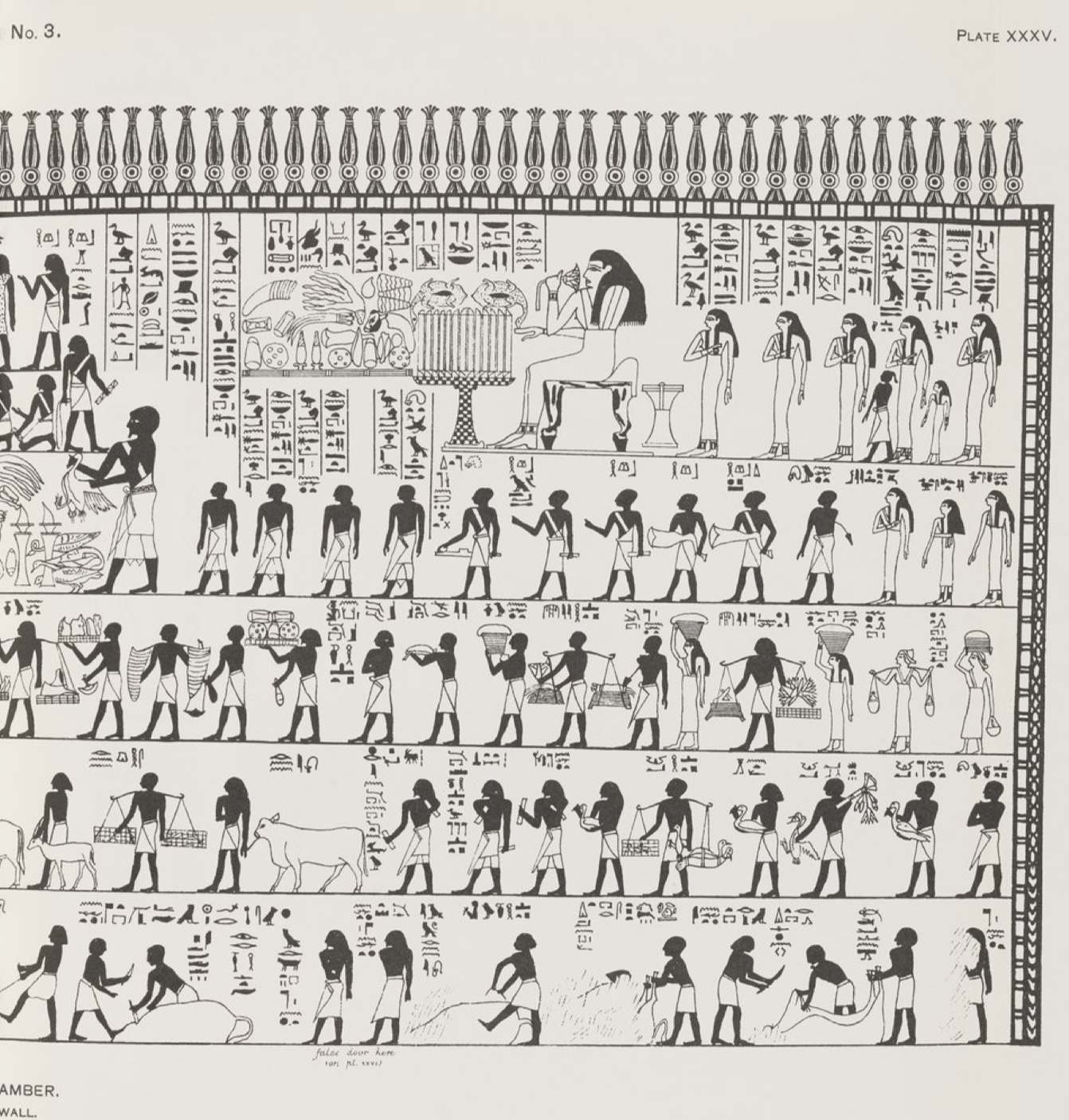
South wall of tomb BH3

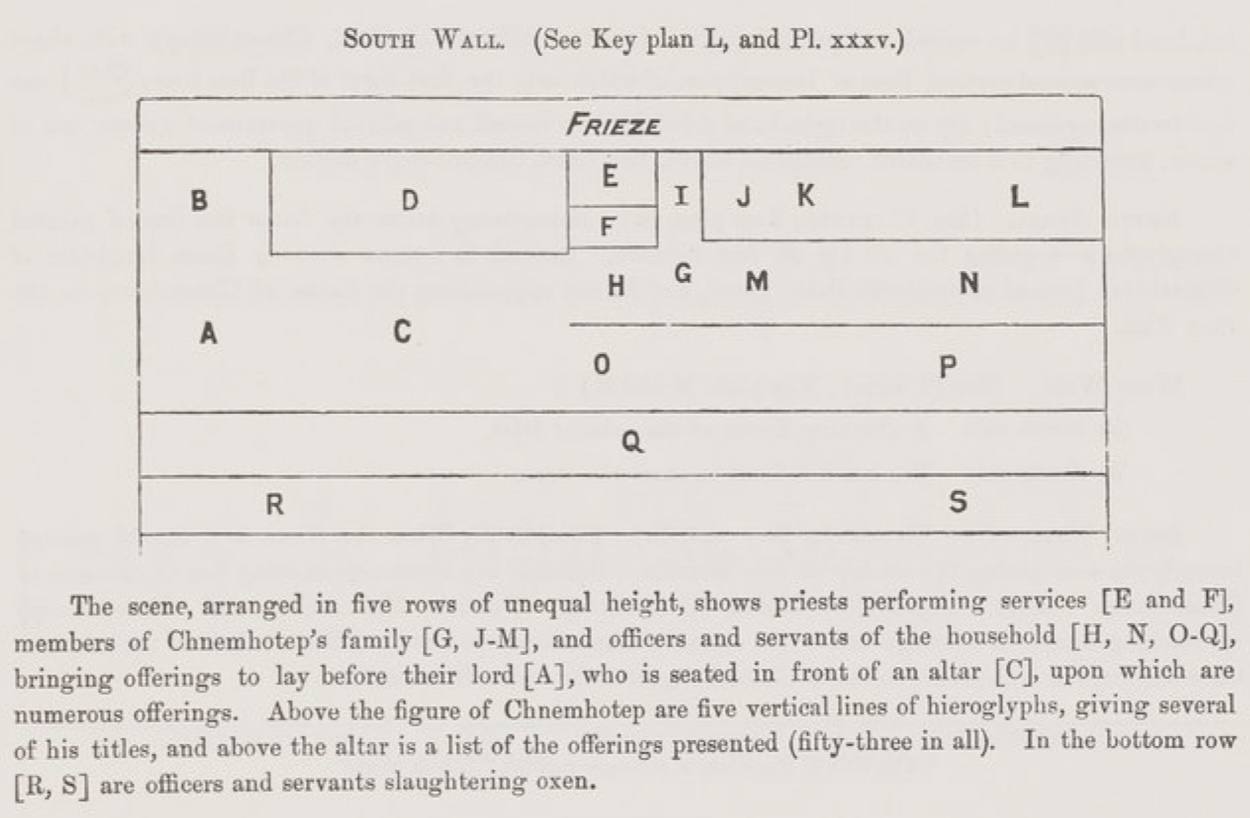
Overview of south wall of Tomb BH3

The fourth wall of this tomb, south wall, was dedicated to the celebration of the cult meal of Khnumhotep II and his wife Khety. The east end of the wall features the deceased seated in front of an offering table covered with offerings holding a flail, traditionally seen as a symbol of royalty or divinity, in his right hand. At the west end of the wall there is an illustration of Khety sitting in front of a full offering table. She is facing left and participating in her husband's meal presented by his cult. The shrine portrays a smaller version of the offering cult and in many ways can be seen as an expansion from the false door of the Old Kingdom, where a statue inside a niche could have been integrated. The placing of statues in the chapel itself is a new funerary art style that appeared in the Middle Kingdom tombs.

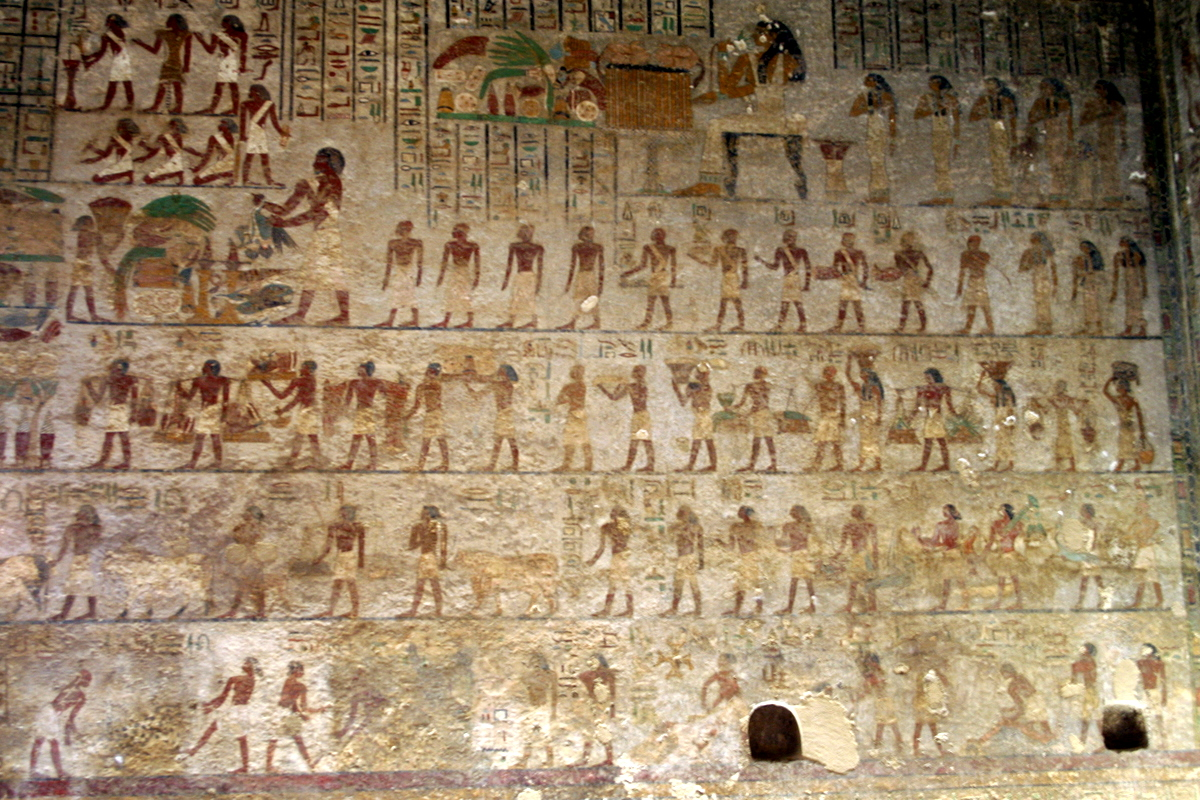
Many of Khnumhotep's relatives. The sitting woman in the top-middle is his wife Khety

=== Shrine ===
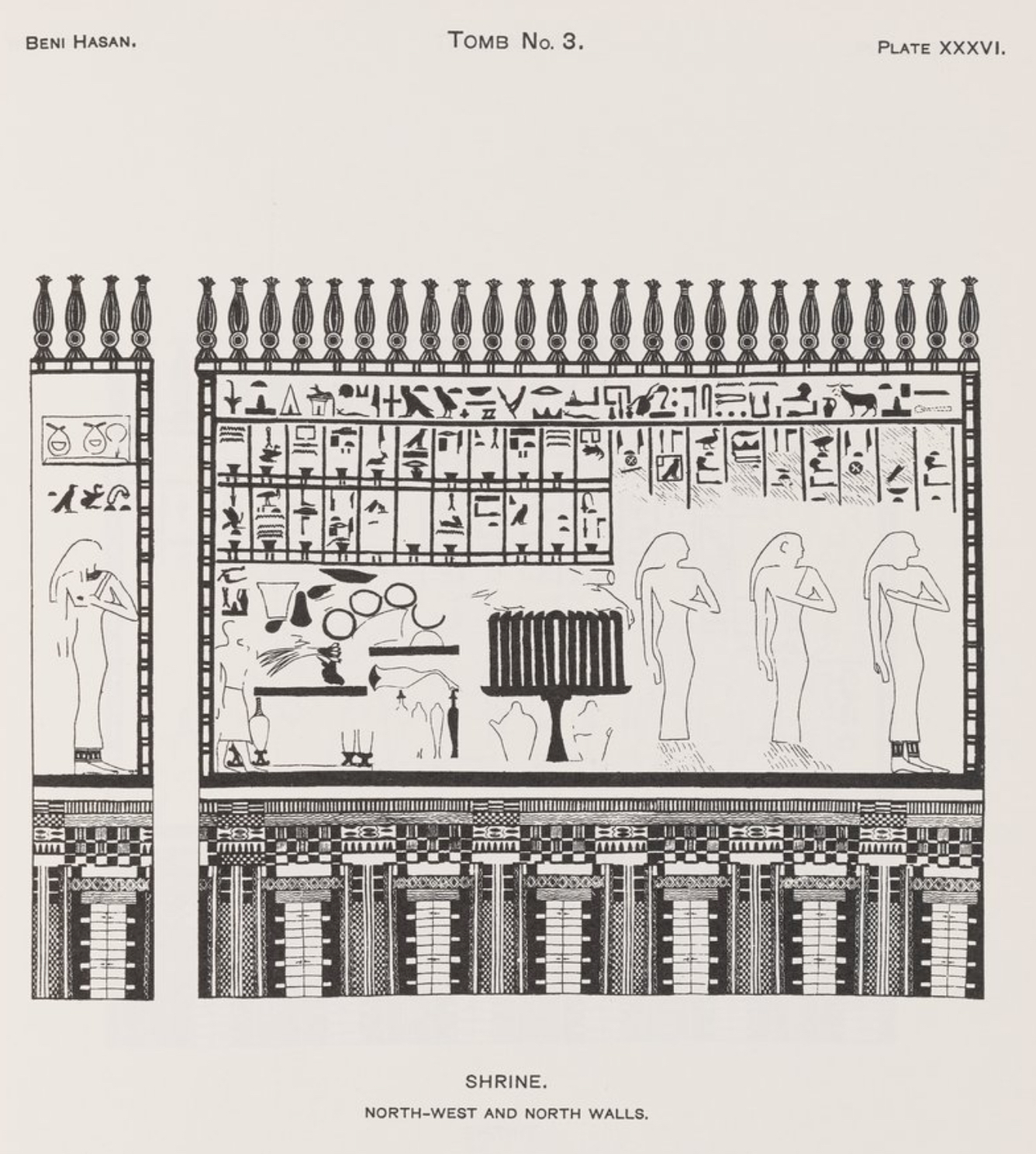
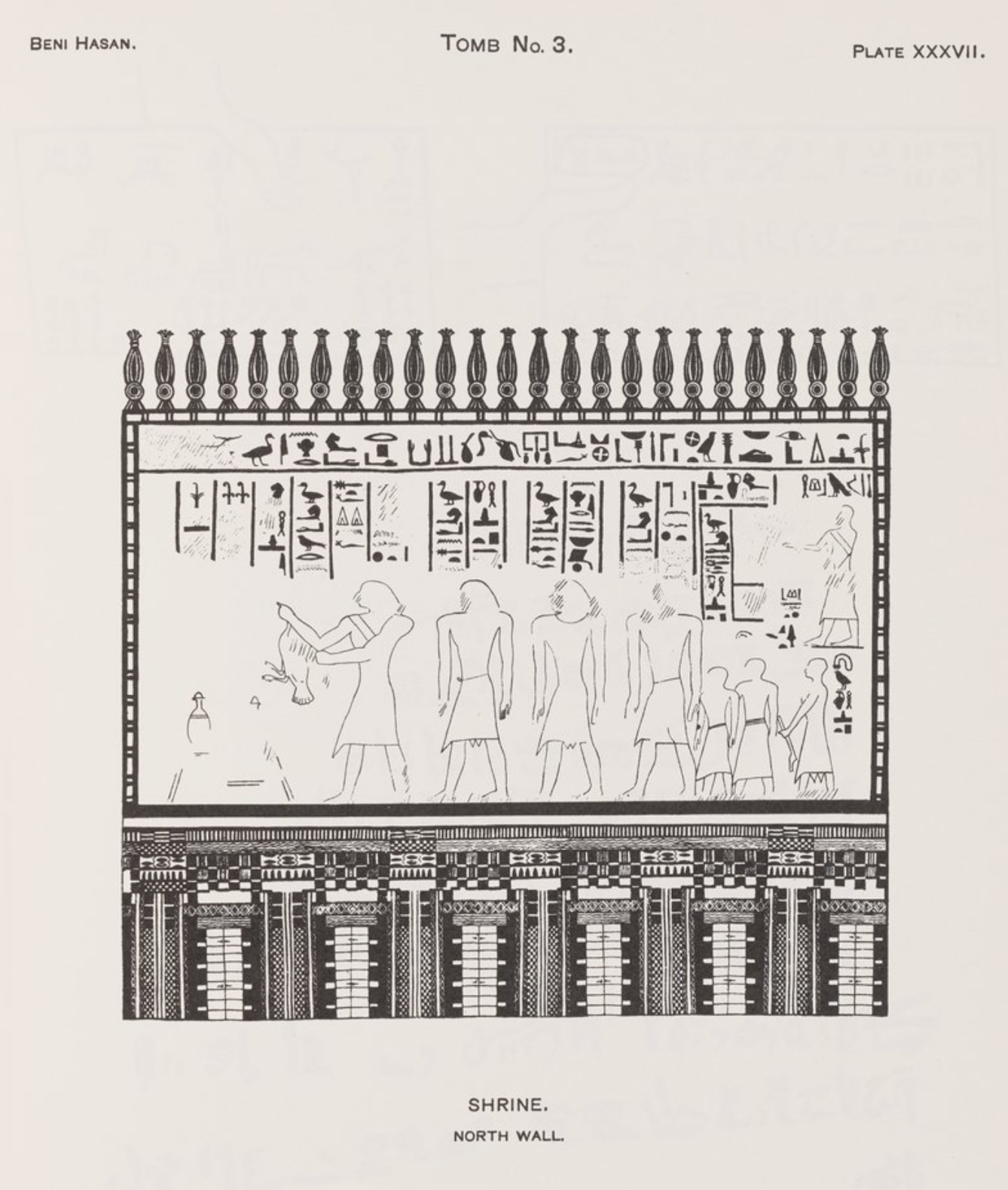
Shrine of BH3, north and south wall. Missing is central statue of Khnumhotep on east wall.

=== Procession of the Aamu ===
West Asiatic visitors to Egypt (c.1900 BCE)
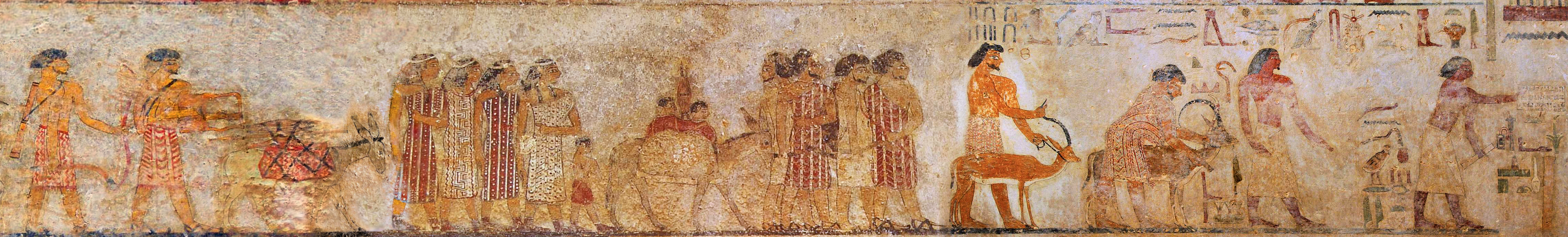
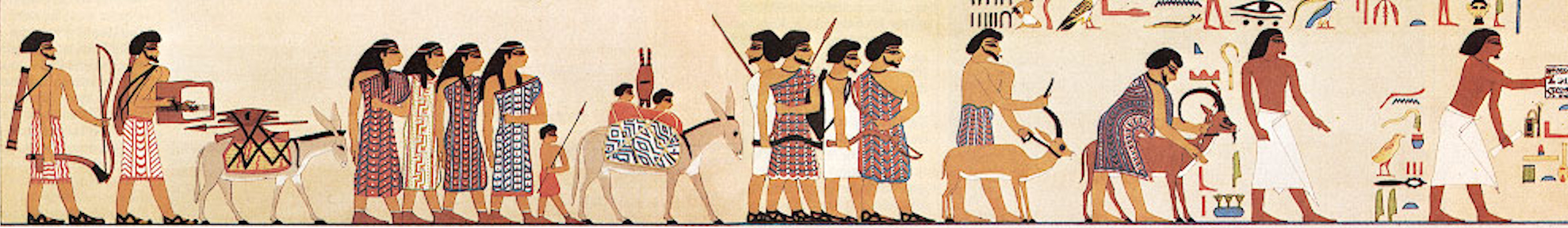
A group of West Asiatic foreigners (and animals) labelled as Aamu (ꜥꜣmw), with the leader labelled as a "Hyksos" visiting the Egyptian official Khnumhotep II circa 1900 BC. Tomb of 12th-dynasty official Khnumhotep II, at Beni Hasan, north wall right side.

What makes this tomb stand out among the 39 large rock-cut tombs at Beni Hasan is the well known scene of the Aamu group from Shu, Asiatic nomadic traders who are sometimes considered Hyksos or at least their forerunners; the group, led by a man called Absha (or Abisha, Abishai), was bringing offerings to the deceased. Though there are fifteen people depicted in the scene, the accompanying inscription mentions there were 37 persons.

=== Goose painting as example of hieroglyph gb ===
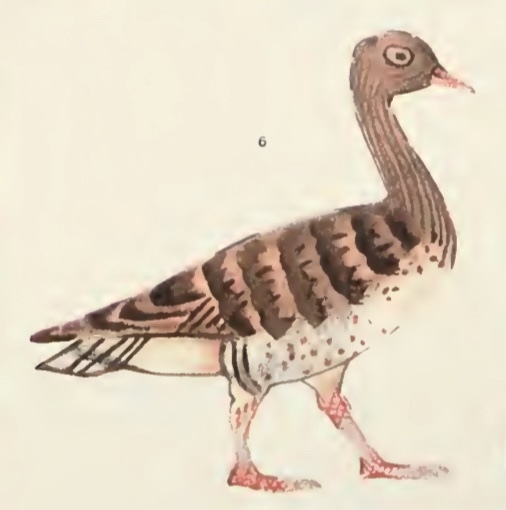
Example of the hieroglyph 𓅬 gb taken from the tomb BH3, south wall, east end, 3rd column from left above Khnumhotep

The tomb paintings contain many examples of hieroglyphs of animals painted with great detail. An important one for the study of hieroglyphs is the example of 𓅬 gb on the south wall. This hieroglyph appears in Gardiner's sign list as G38, the white-fronted goose.
