= Aamu =

Ancient Egyptian ethnonym for Levantine peoples, translated into English as "Asiatic"

Procession of the Aamu
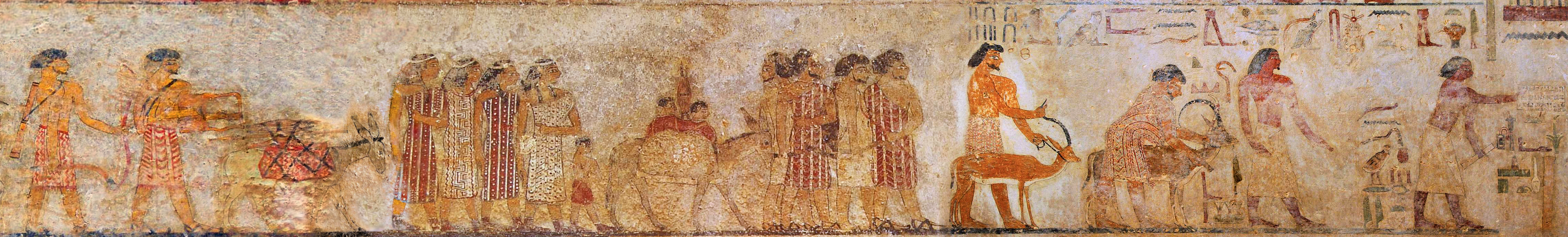
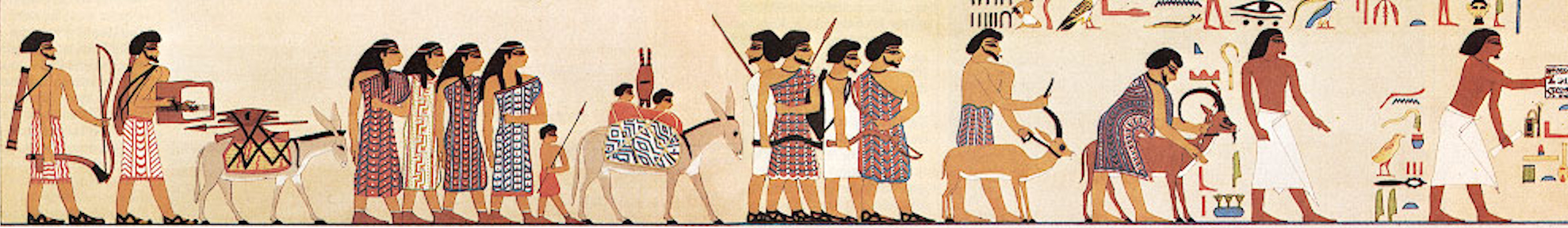
A group of West Asiatic foreigners, possibly Canaanites, labelled as Aamu (ꜥꜣmw), including the leading man with a Nubian ibex labelled as Abisha the Hyksos (𓋾𓈎𓐰𓈉, ḥqꜣ-ḫꜣswt, Heqa-khasut for "Hyksos"). Tomb of 12th-dynasty official Khnumhotep II, who served under Senusret III, at Beni Hasan c. 1900 BCE.

D36 G1 G17 G43
Aamu
in hieroglyphs

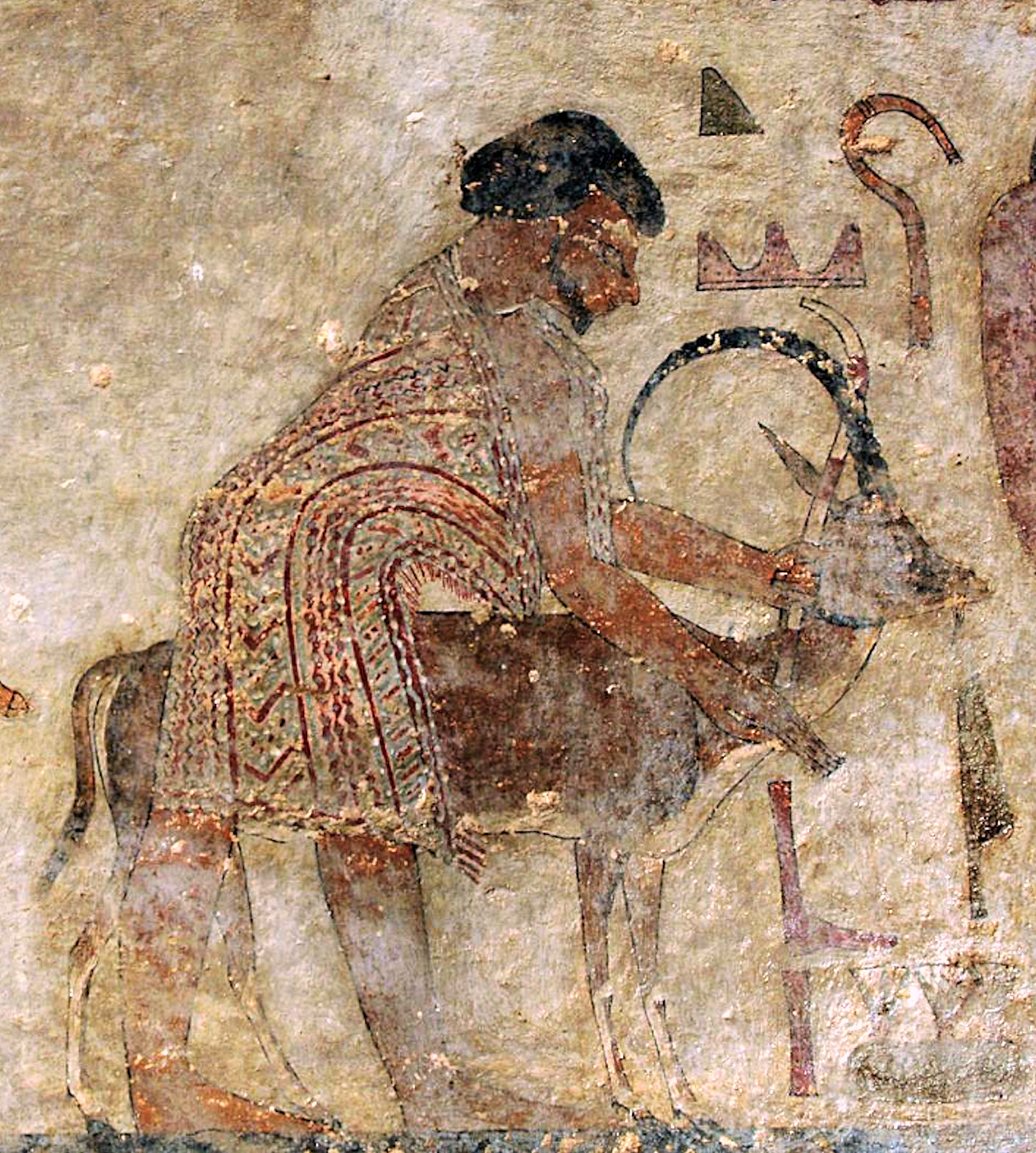
The leader of the Aamu in the painting is a man described as "Abisha the Hyksos" (𓋾𓈎𓐰𓈉, ḥqꜣ-ḫꜣswt, Heqa-khasut for "Hyksos"). Tomb of Khnumhotep II, circa 1900 BCE.

Aamu (Ancient Egyptian: 𓂝𓄿𓅓𓅱, romanized: ꜥꜣmw) was a name used to designate West Asians in ancient Egypt. It is often translated as "Western Asiatic", but it might refer specifically to Canaanites or Amorites. The Egyptologist and linguist Thomas Schneider states that ꜥꜣm was attested as early as the Sixth Dynasty of Egypt and is likely a loanword from early Semitic term drmj, "inhabitant of the south (of Palestine)".

Contemporary Egyptian sources from the time of the wars against the Hyksos also refer to the latter as ꜥꜣmw. Although they have left no inscriptions in their own language, some of their personal names have turned up in Egyptian records, which are a syntactical and lexical match for West Semitic dialects. An ancient Egyptian painting in the tomb of 12th Dynasty official Khnumhotep II, at Beni Hasan (c. 1900 BCE), shows a group of West Asiatic foreigners, possibly Canaanites, labelled as Aamu (ꜥꜣmw), including the leading man with a Nubian ibex labelled "Abisha the Hyksos" (𓋾𓈎𓐰𓈉, ḥqꜣ-ḫꜣswt, Heqa-khasut for "Hyksos"). The Aamu from this relief are further labeled as being from the area of Shu, which may be identified, with some uncertainty, with the area of Moab in southern Palestine around the Jordan River, or generally the southern Levant, just east of the Jordan and the Red Sea.

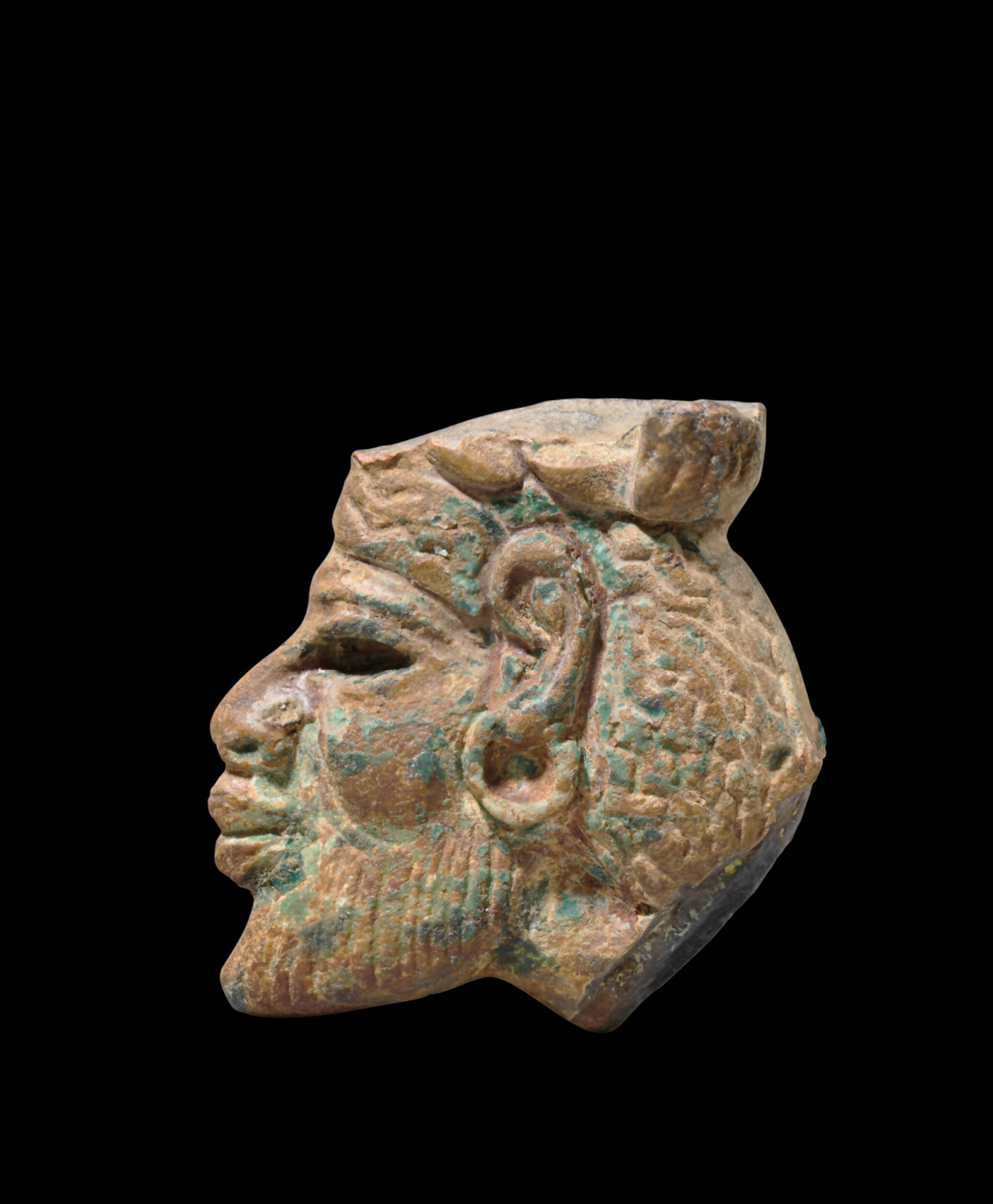
An Egyptian glazed steatite profile head of an Asiatic 1540-1190 BCE

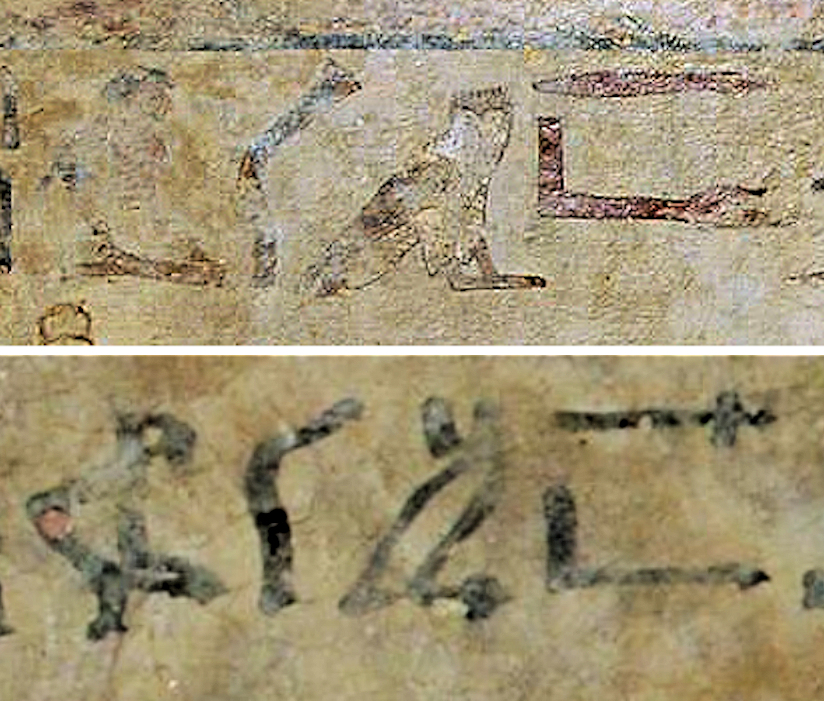
Word "Aamu" (𓉻𓐰𓂝𓅓𓌙𓀏 from right to left) in two Egyptian scripts, in the tomb of Khnumhotep II.

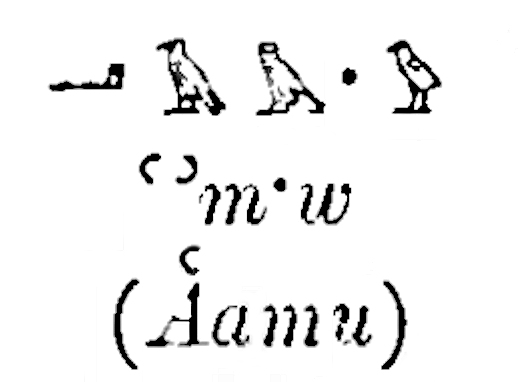
A more recent description of the word (left to right, 1898)

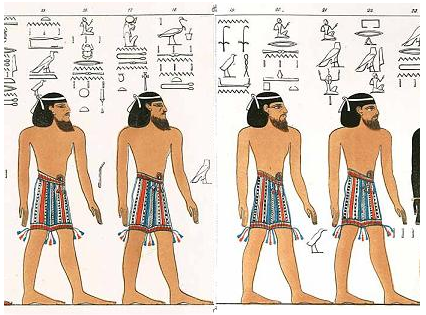
Aamu people (𓂝𓄿𓅓𓅱 characters spread alongside each individual) in the Book of Gates (rendering)

== See also ==
- Throw stick (hieroglyph)
- Names of the Levant
