= High steward (Ancient Egypt) =

High steward in hieroglyphs
m r pr wr
imi-r pr wr
Great overseer of the house

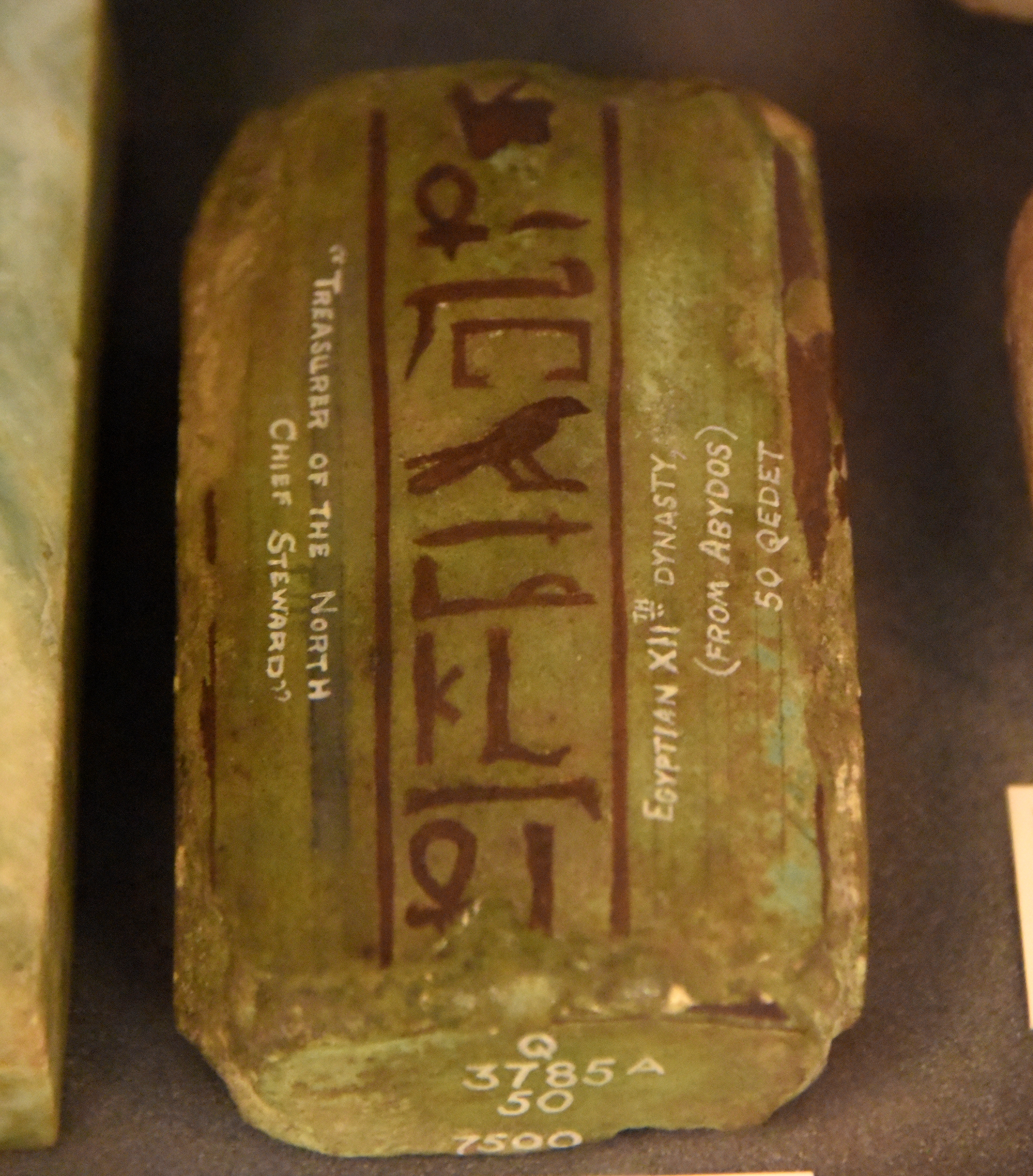
Green glazed faience weight, inscribed for the high Steward Aabeni. Late Middle Kingdom. From Abydos, Egypt. The Petrie Museum of Egyptian Archaeology, London

The high steward (also called chief steward or great overseer of the house; Egyptian: imi-r pr wr) was an important official at the royal court in Ancient Egypt in the Middle Kingdom and in the New Kingdom. He was the main person in charge of the estates supplying the palace and the royal residence with food. The office appears in the 11th Dynasty. To the earliest title holders belong Henenu and Meketre. After the vizier and the treasurer this was the most important office at the royal court; important title holders of the 12th Dynasty were Siese and Khnumhotep III, both were later in their career appointed vizier.

The title was still very important in the New Kingdom and was in this period often called high steward of the king. An important title holder of the New Kingdom was Senenmut under Hatshepsut, other include Wadjetrenput serving under the same queen.

== Chief steward of the God's Wife ==
During the 25th and 26th dynasties, the role of God's Wife of Amun greatly rose in importance, both religiously and politically. Their offices required several servants and employees, led by a chief steward of the God's Wife (imy-r pr wr n ḥm.t nṯr) who was in charge of the estates of the God's Wife. These were highly wealthy officials known from their monumental tombs at Thebes. Title holders include Harwa and Akhamunru.
