= Horkherty =

Horkherty was an Ancient Egyptian official of the Twelfth Dynasty under king Senusret III. Horkherty is so far only known from his mastaba found next to the pyramid of the king at Dahshur. North of the Pyramid of Senusret III at Dahshur is a small cemetery belonging to officials serving under the king. The largest tomb there belongs to the treasurer Sobekemhat, a slightly smaller mastaba right next to this one belongs to the vizier Nebit. A third big mastaba belonged to Horkherty. The mastaba is not well preserved. His titles include royal sealer and king's acquaintance. Within his mastaba complex was found the unlooted burial of a woman called Sitwerut, perhaps the wife of Horkherty.
