= Khenemetneferhedjet II =

Xnm t nfr HDt wr t

Queen consort of Egypt
- King: Senusret III
- Burial: Dahshur, Giza, Egypt
- Spouse: Senusret III
- Dynasty: 12th Dynasty of Egypt
- Religion: Ancient Egyptian religion

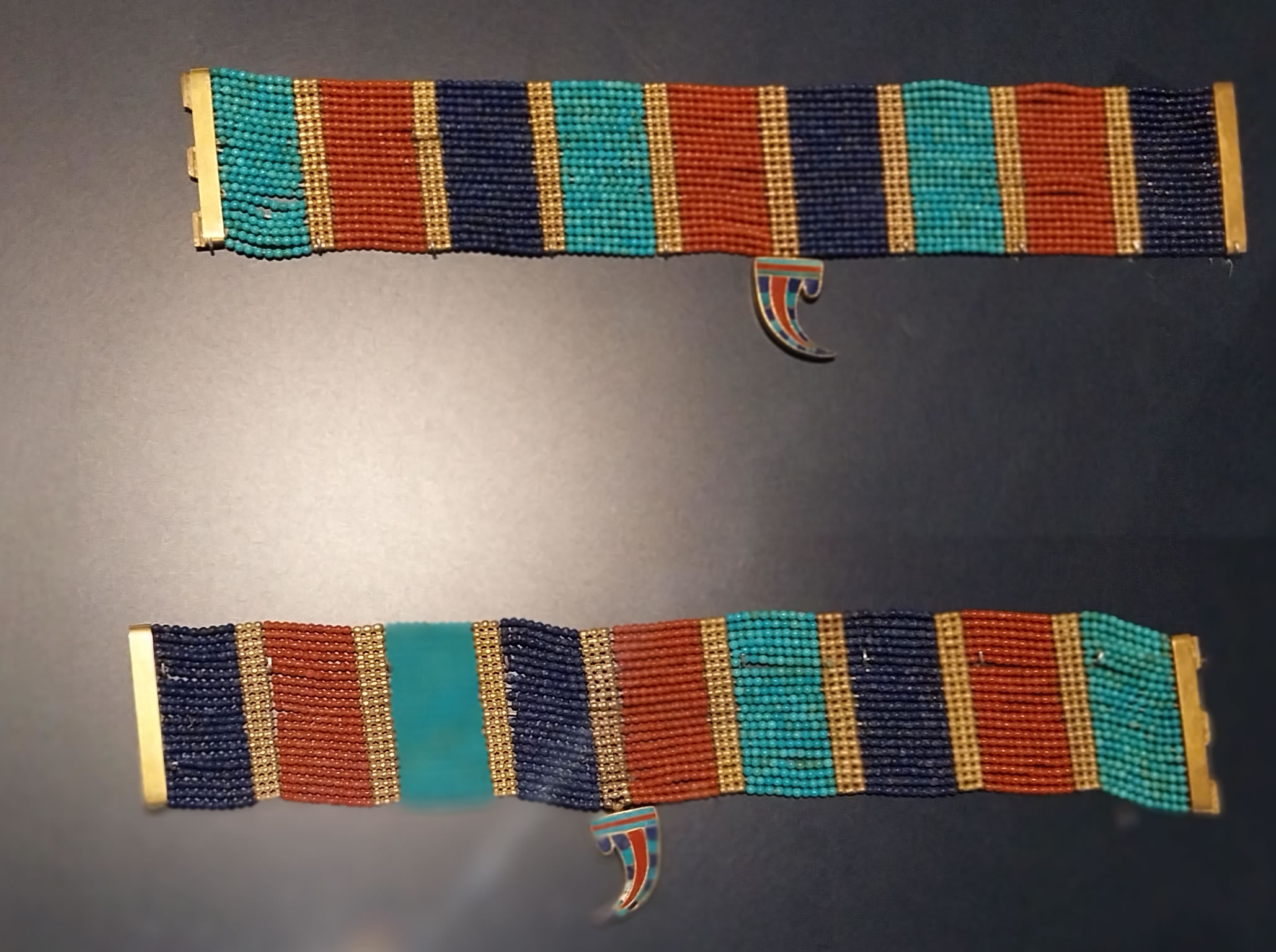
bracelets of Khenmet nefer hedjet iii

Khenemetneferhedjet II (Weret) was an ancient Egyptian queen of the 12th Dynasty, a wife of Senusret III.

She was one of 3 known wives of Senusret III. The other 2 were Neferthenut and Itakayt. Her name was also a queen's title used in the era: khenemetneferhedjet means “united with the white crown”. She is mentioned on two of her husband's statues (now located in the British Museum and in the Egyptian Museum, respectively; the latter was found in Herakleopolis). She was buried in Pyramid IX in the Dahshur pyramid complex, where her jewellery was found in 1994.

Her titles were: King's Wife and Great of Sceptre.

According to researchers, the tomb had been thoroughly plundered by the time it was first excavated, the Queen's mummy completely ransacked for jewelry and badly damaged. Analysis of the body revealed Weret was left-handed and the sharp nasal sills indicated a Caucasoid person. Overall, the remains revealed she lived a life of leisure, virtually free of all physical labour, and lived well into her seventies and was buried in a style befitting her royal status.
