= Mereret =

Mereret may refer to:

- Mereret (12th Dynasty), Ancient Egyptian king's daughter associated with Senusret III and Amenemhat III.
- Mereret (4th dynasty), Egyptian princess
- Mereret (Ankhu's wife), wife of vizier Ankhu.
