= Sithathor =

Ancient Egyptian princess

O10 G39 X1
Sithathor
in hieroglyphs
Era: Middle Kingdom
(2055–1650 BC)

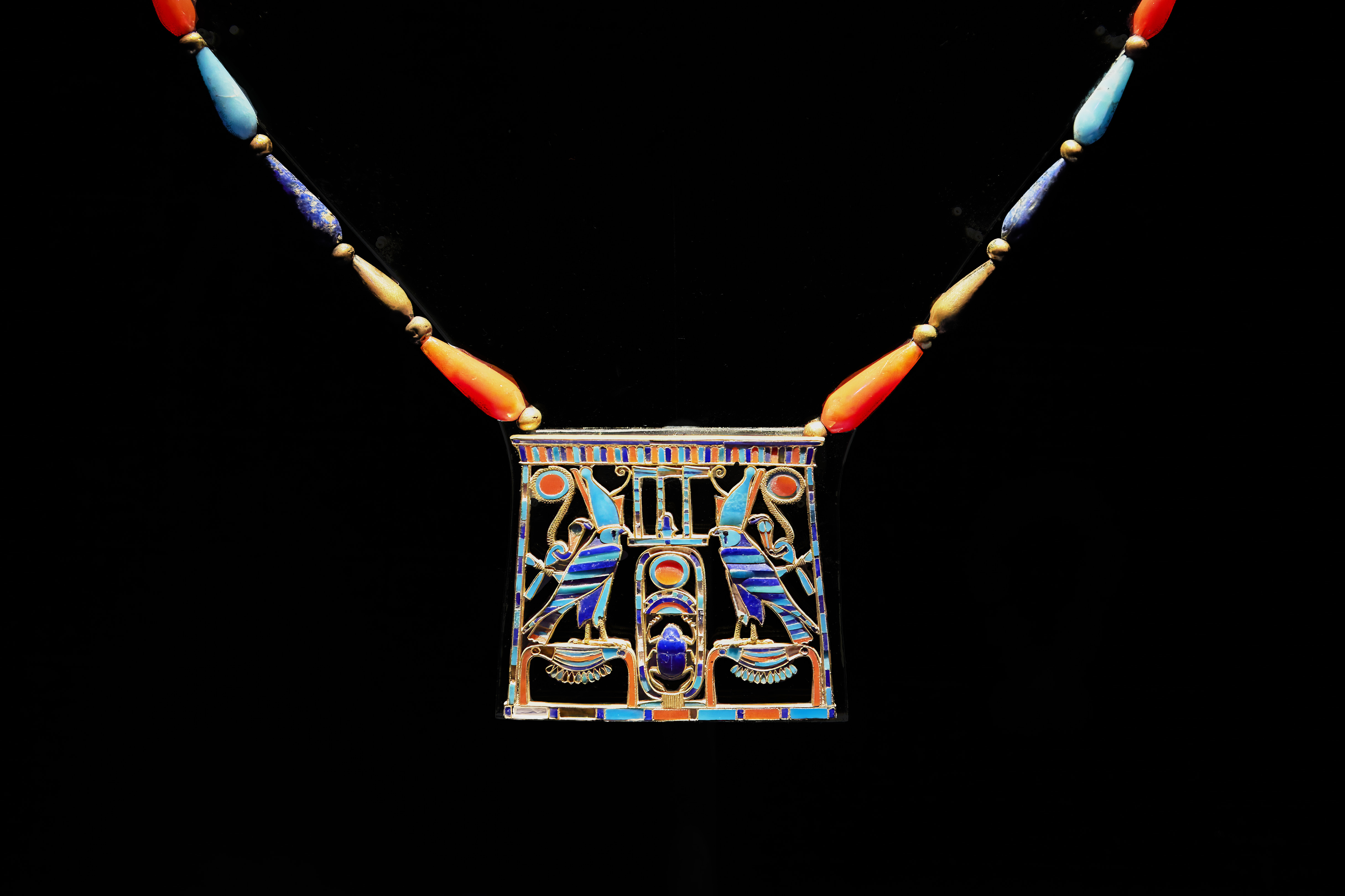
A close up view of Sithathor's exquisite pectoral

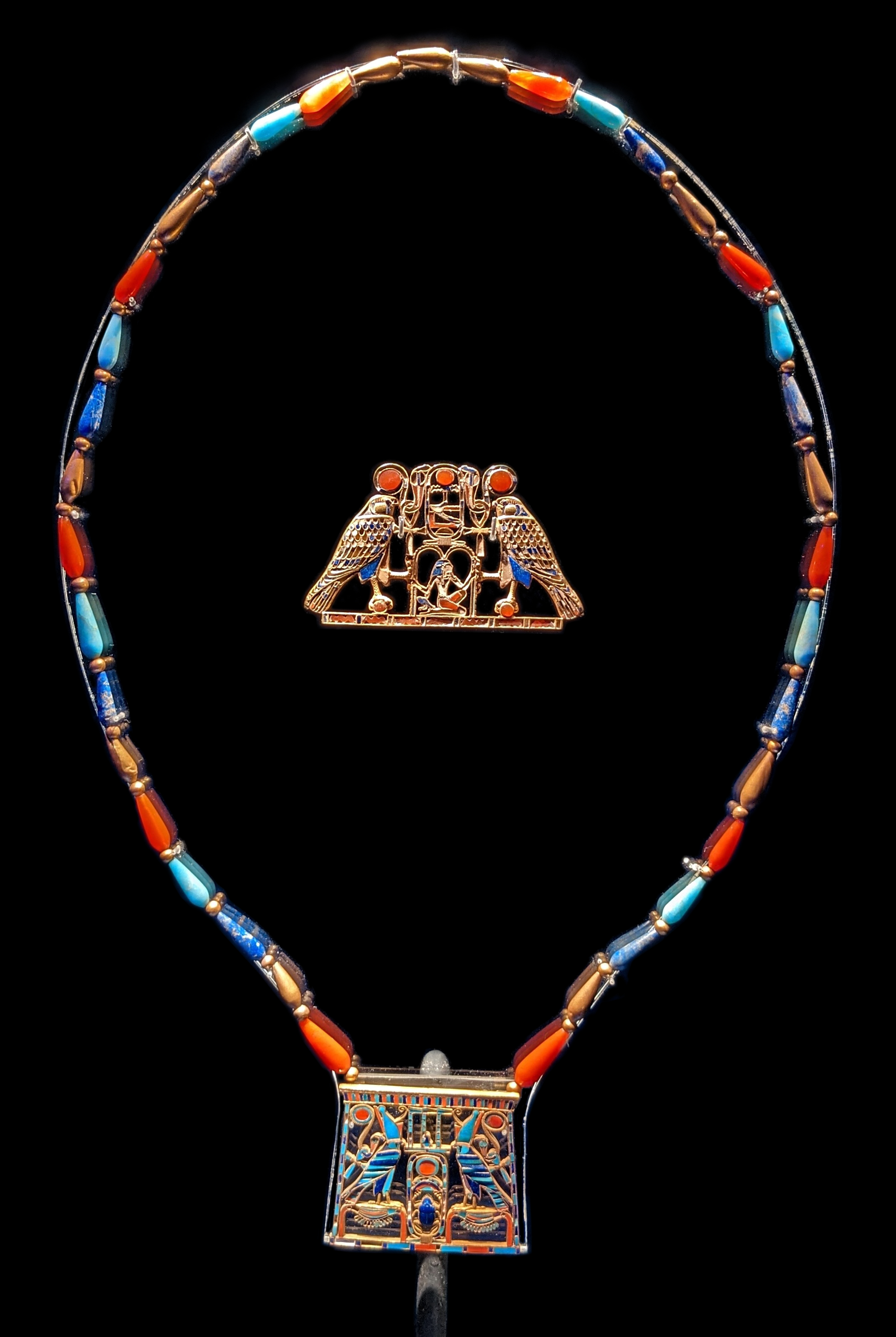
Sithathor's pectoral bearing the name of Senusret II

Sithathor (daughter of Hathor) was an ancient Egyptian princess with the title king's daughter. She is only known from her burial at Dahshur.

Next to the pyramid of king Senusret III were found underground galleries as a burial place for royal women. Most of the burials were found looted, but there were two boxes for jewellery overlooked by tomb robbers. Both boxes contained an outstanding collection of jewellery. They were called the first and the second treasure of Dahshur.

The first treasure was discovered on 6 March 1894 and belonged most likely once to Sithathor. One scarab with her name was found. The treasure contained a pectoral with the names of king Senusret II, one of the masterpieces of Egyptian goldwork. Other objects were golden shells, golden bracelets, a mirror and several stone vases. Within the gallery tombs only two had insribed sarcophagi, so the attribution of the treasure to a certain burial is not fully sure. Sithahtor might have been buried in Tomb 9, that is next to the place where the treasure was found. Only very few burials good were discovered there. These incluse the sarcophagus, a canopic box, beads and pieces of a flails (ceremonial whip),

Sithathor is not known for sure outside her tomb. She was perhaps a daughter of Senusret III, or more likely she was the daughter of Senusret II and buried as a sister of king Senusret III next to Senusret III's pyramid complex. The other jewellery box belonged to a king's daughter with the name Mereret or Meret.

== The objects found ==
- Pectoral with the name of king Senusret II
- Two end pieces of an armelt with a djed pillar
- clasp with bat figure
- clasp with withn ib, two netjer and a hetep sign.
- six gold shells
- golden shell
- Thirty one smaller golden shells
- two bracelets consisting of many beads of different materials and eight long, rectangualr metal plaques.
- two simple bracelets made of gold sheet
- six small lion figures

== Literature ==
- Jacques Jean Marie de Morgan: Fouilles a Dahchour, Mars-Juin 1894, Wien 1895, p. 60-64 (online)
- Dieter Arnold: The Pyramid Complex of Senwosret III at Dahshur, Architectural Studies, New York 2002, p. 70 ISBN 0-87099-956-7
