= Senusret III =

12th dynasty pharaoh of Ancient Egypt

- Sesostris III, Senwosret III, Senweseret III
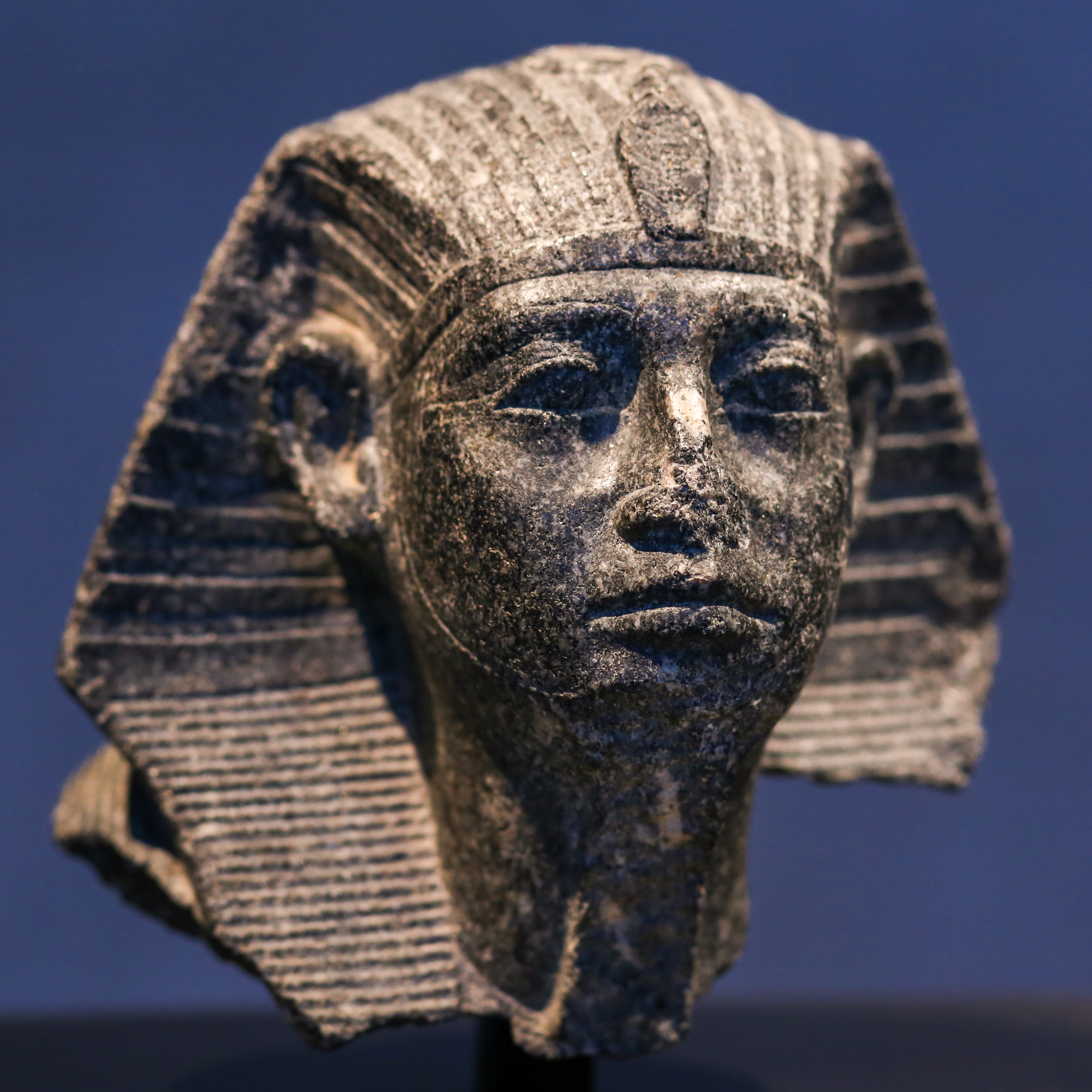
- Statue of Senusret III in the Staatliche Sammlung für Ägyptische Kunst

Pharaoh
- Reign: 19/39 regnal years c. 1878 - c. 1839 BC
- Predecessor: Senusret II
- Successor: Amenemhat III
Royal titulary
Horus name
Netjerkheperu
Nṯrj-ḫprw
Horus, divine of form
G5	nTr xpr w
Nebty name
Netjermesut
Nṯrj-mswt
The two ladies, divine of birth
G16	nTr ms w t
Golden Horus
Kheper
Bjk-nbw-ḫpr
The golden Horus has been created
G8	xpr G8
Prenomen
Khakaure
Ḫˁj-k3w-Rˁ
The Kas of Ra have appeared

M23 X1 L2 X1	ra N28 D28 D28 D28
Nomen
Senusret
S(j)-n-Wsrt
Man of Wosret

G39 N5	F12 s D21 t z n
- Consorts: Neferthenut, Khenemetneferhedjet II, and Itakayt
- Children: Amenemhat III
- Father: Senusret II
- Mother: Khnemetneferhedjet I
- Died: c. 1839 BC
- Monuments: Pyramid of Senusret III
- Dynasty: 12th dynasty of Egypt

Khakaure Senusret III (also written as Senwosret III or the hellenised form, Sesostris III; died c. 1839 BC) was the fifth king of the late 12th Dynasty of the Egyptian Middle Kingdom. His military campaigns gave rise to an era of peace and economic prosperity that reduced the power of regional rulers and led to a revival in craftwork, trade, and urban development. Senusret III was among the few Egyptian kings who were deified and honored with a cult during their own lifetime.

== Family ==
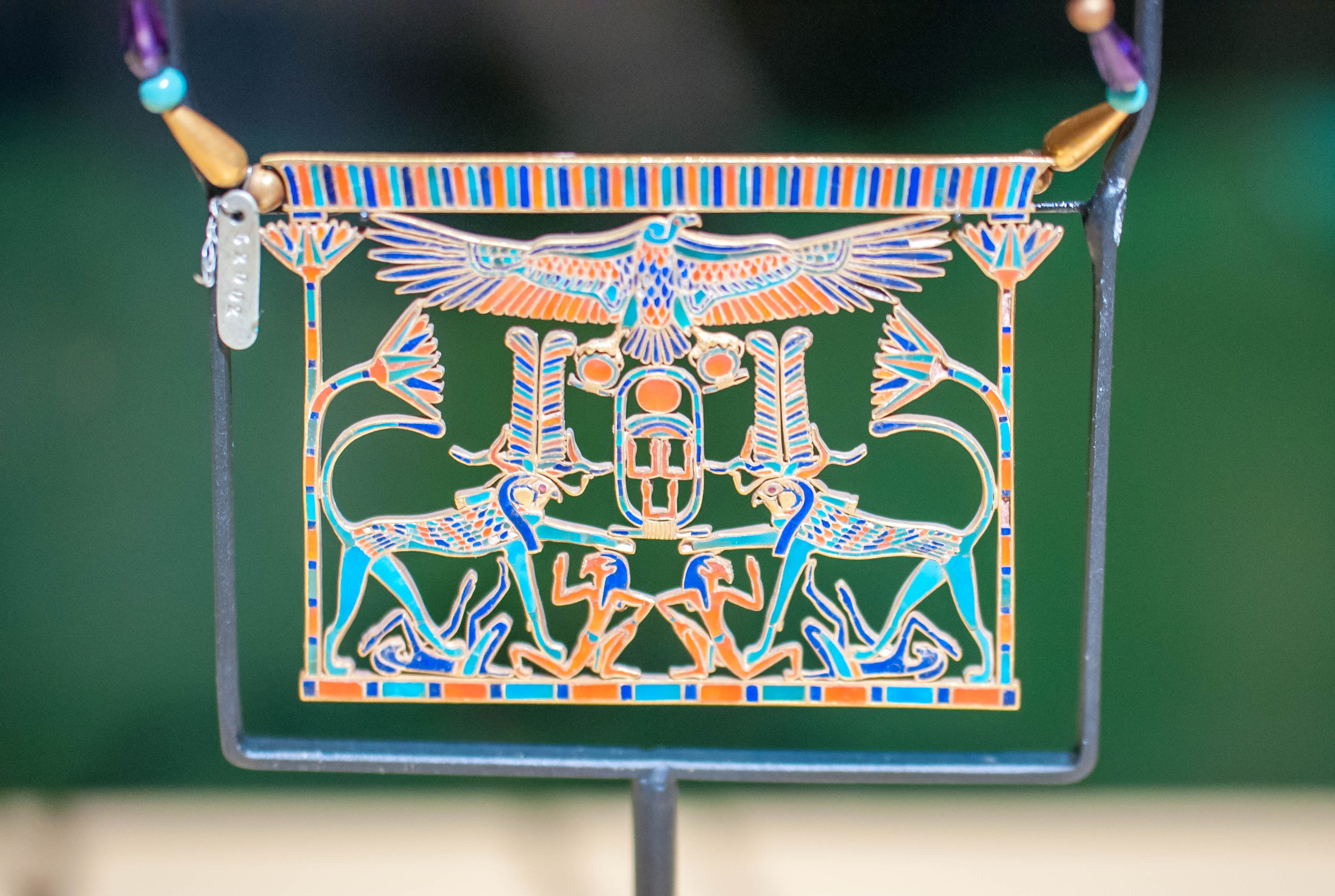
A Pectoral bearing the cartouche or royal name of Senusret III found in the tomb of Mereret at Dashur

Senusret III was the son of Senusret II and Khenemetneferhedjet I, also called Khenemetneferhedjet I Weret (the elder). Three wives of Senusret III are known for certain. These are Itakayt, Khenemetneferhedjet II, and Neferthenut, all three mainly known from their burials next to the pyramid of the king at Dahshur.

=== Children with unknown spouse(s) ===
- Amenemhat III (died c. 1814 BC): His successor

=== Possible children ===
- Sithathor
- Mereret: Her tomb was found partly robbed but a pectoral of Senusret III was missed by the tomb robbers.
- Menet
- Senetsenebtysy

== Reign ==
He was a great king of the 12th Dynasty and is considered to have ruled at the height of the Middle Kingdom. Consequently, he is regarded as one of the sources for the legend about Sesostris. Proposed dates for his rule may vary depending on author, from around c. 1878 BC to c. 1839 BC during a time of great power and prosperity.

=== Accession ===
Senusret III succeeded his father Senusret II upon the death of the latter. There is no evidence, such as double-dated stelae, indicating a coregency between the two. Thus, Senusret III would have had his accession year (Year 0) for the remaining months and days of regnal Year [19] of Senusret II, and formally started his Year 1 on I Akhet day 1 (New Year).

=== Constructions ===
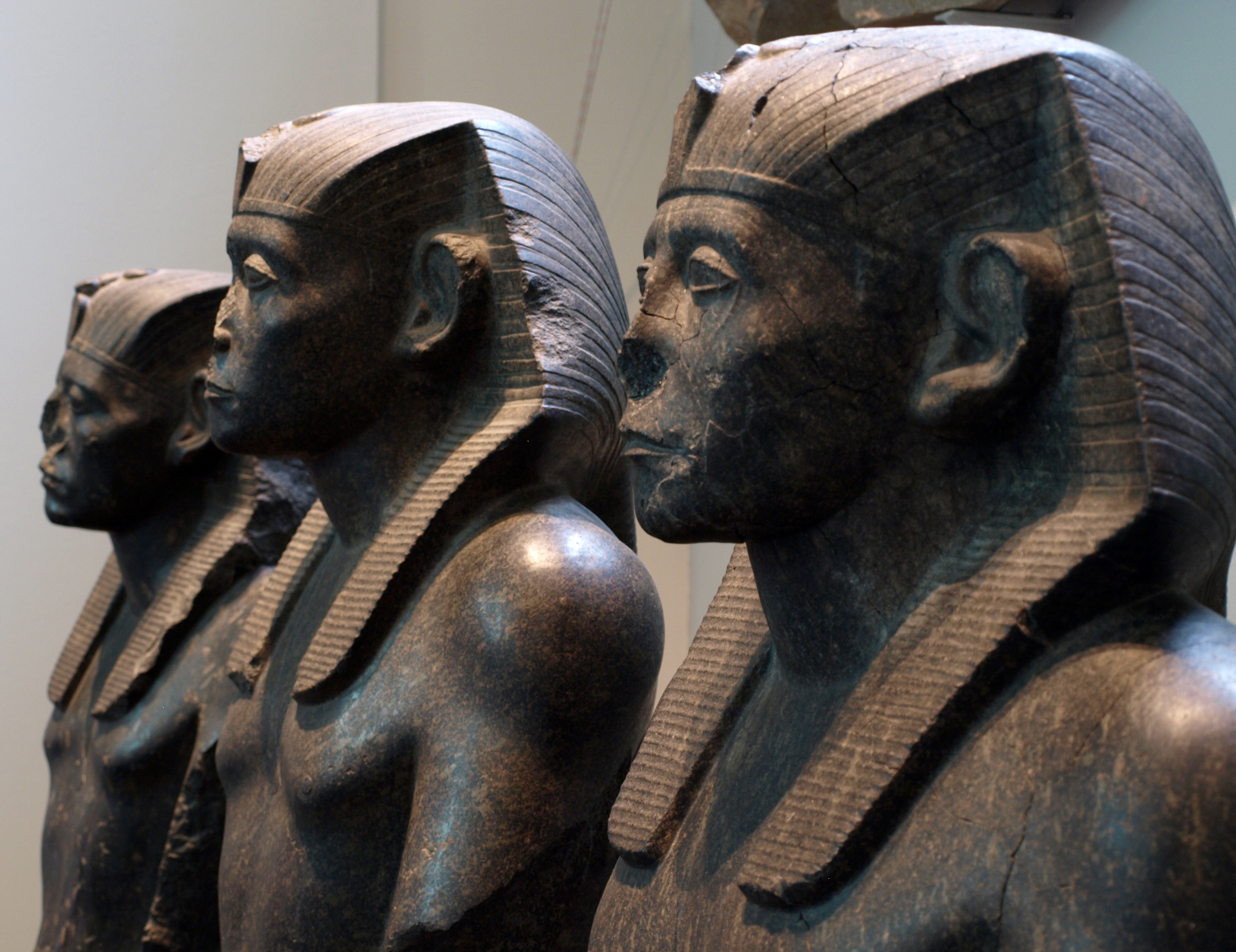
Statues of Senusret III in the British Museum

==== Water canals ====
Water canals were important for river transport and irrigation. Senusret III cleared a navigable canal through the first cataract of the Nile River, (this was different from the Canal of the Pharaohs, which apparently, Senusret III also tried to build). Jacques Morgan, in 1894, found rock inscriptions near Sehel Island documenting his digging of a canal.

==== Medamud ====
At Medamud, he built at the Temple of Montu.

==== Abydos ====
At Abydos, in his late reign, Senusret III built the planned town Wah-Sut, a mortuary temple and a second tomb dug into the bed-rock beneath the Mountain of Anubis.

==== Qantir ====
At Qantir, blocks from a doorway was found (in a secondary context?).

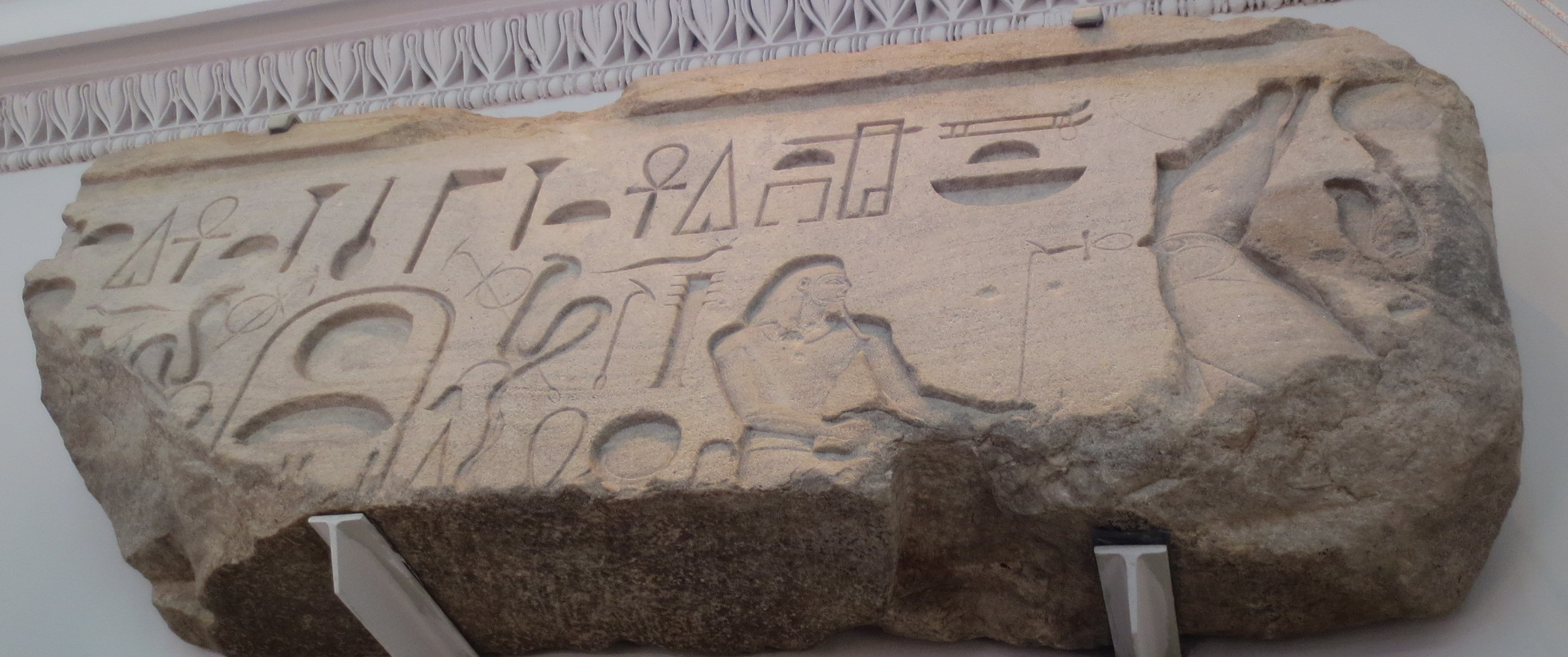
White Quartzite image of Sensuret III from the British Museum. Origin Unknown. From c. 1850 BC during the 12th Dynasty.

=== Levant ===
During the reign of Sensusret III, the Egyptians were active along the Levantine coast and inland in the Southern Levant. The relations to local lands and peoples were based on trade and military campaigns. One campaign may have occurred around Year 16 (see stela below: Nubia).

==== Sebek-khu stele ====
The Sebek-khu Stele, dated to the reign of Senusret III, records the earliest known Egyptian military campaign in the Levant. The text reads "His Majesty proceeded northward to overthrow the Asiatics (Aamu ꜥꜣmw; Asiatics; Amorites). His Majesty reached a foreign country of which the name was Sekmem (...) Then Sekmem fell, together with the wretched Retenu", where Sekmem (s-k-m-m) is thought to be Shechem and "Retenu" or "Retjenu" are associated with ancient Syria.

=== Nubia ===
During the 12th Dynasty, Nubia had been a region into which the great kings could expand their territory and secure resources. The reign of Senusret III was characterized by several military campaigns in Nubia and development of fortresses to secure the region (cf. the reign of Senusret I). Such was his forceful nature and immense influence that Senusret III was worshipped as a deity in Semna by later generations.

He pushed his expantion into Nubia where he erected massive river forts including Buhen, Semna, Shalfak, and Toshka at Uronarti. He carried out at least four major campaigns into Nubia in his Years 8, 10, 16, and 19.

Year 8 | His Year 8 stela at Semna documents his victories against the Nubians, through which he is thought to have made safe the southern frontier, preventing further incursions into Egypt.

Year 16, III Akhet | At Semna a great stela is dated to the third month of Year 16 of his reign mentions his military activities against both Nubia and Canaan. In it, he admonished his future successors to maintain the new border that he had created:

Year 16, third month of winter: the king made his southern boundary at Heh. I have made my boundary further south than my fathers. I have added to what was bequeathed me. (...) As for any son (i.e., successor) of mine who shall maintain this border which my Majesty has made, he is my son born to my Majesty. The true son is he who champions his father, who guards the border of his begetter. But he [who] abandons it, who fails to fight for it, he is not my son, he was not born to me. Now my majesty has had an image made of my majesty, at this border which my majesty has made, in order that you maintain it, in order that you fight for it.

Year 19 | His final military campaign, which was in his Year 19, was less successful because the king's forces were caught due to the Nile being lower than normal. They had to retreat and abandon their campaign in order to avoid being trapped in the hostile Nubian territory.

Although Senusret III established strict controls along Egypt's southern frontier, his border policies allowed Nubians to travel to the Egyptian fortress at Mirgissa for trade. This exception is documented in his Year 8 boundary stela at Semna.

==== Semna Boundary Stela ====
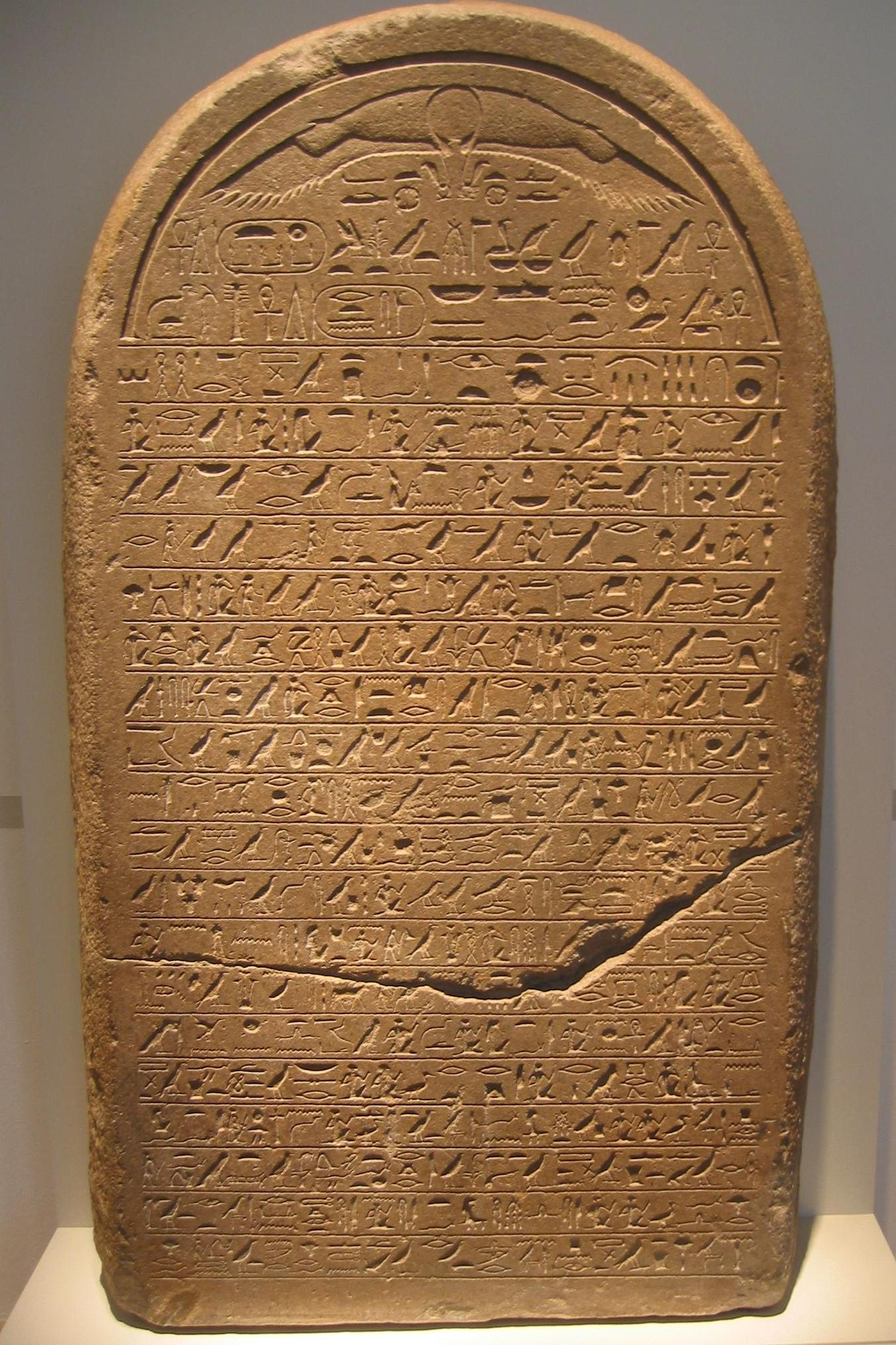
The Year 16 border stela of Senusret III (Altes Museum), Berlin

In Nubia, the region of Semna had been established as a fortified area in the reign of Senusret I. One of the three forts of Semna, known as Semna-West was where king Senusret III formed the stela known as the Semna Boundary Stela of Senusret III.

One of Senusret I's major achievements was the conquest of Lower Nubia, which was later consolidated by Senusret III. In general in ancient Egypt, boundary stela served the purpose of demarcating territorial lines, acting as a notice that the demarcation was to be enforced. When Senusret III built various fortresses along the Second Nile Cataract as a militant frontier guard against the Kerma kingdom, he also constructed two monumental stela at the forts of Semna and Uronarti. The stela reiterated Egyptian dominance over Nubia and called for future authorities to preserve the boundary.

The stela was discovered in 1845 by German Egyptologist Karl Lepsius. The text clearly reinforces Senusret III's expansionist policies. The stela was replaced during the 18th Dynasty to be incorporated into shrines for mortuary cult worship.

An English translation of the central text of the Semna Boundary Stela of Senusret III:

His Majesty established the southern border at Heh.
I established my border further south than my forefathers.
I added to what was bequeathed to me. I am a king who speaks and acts.
I make happen what I conceive, eager to seize, hasty to succeed, in whose heart a matter doesn't slumber, anticipating inferiors, suppressing mercy, merciless to the enemy who attacks him, who attacks one who would attack, who is silent when one is silent, who replies to a matter as befits it.
For to be idle after an attack is to strengthen the heart of the enemy.
Aggression is valour and retreat is cowardice.
Who is driven from his border is truly a coward.
For the Nubian listens to the word of mouth. Answering him is making him retreat.
If one acts aggressively towards him, he turns his back.
Retreat, and he will take occasion to act aggressively.
For they are not respectable people. They are wretches with broken spirits.
My Majesty has seen them; it is no lie. I captured their women, I carried off their underlings, went to their wells, drove off their bulls, tore out their barley, set fire to it. As my father lives for me, I speak truthfully, there is no boast that comes from my mouth.
As for any son of mine who shall maintain this border that My Majesty established, he is my son, born to My Majesty. It befits a son that he be the champion of his father, and maintains the border of his begetter. As to him who shall lose it, who shall not fight for it, he is not my son, he was not born to me.
Now, My Majesty had a statue of My Majesty made at this border that My Majesty established, so that you may be persistent at it and that you may fight for it.

=== Worship ===
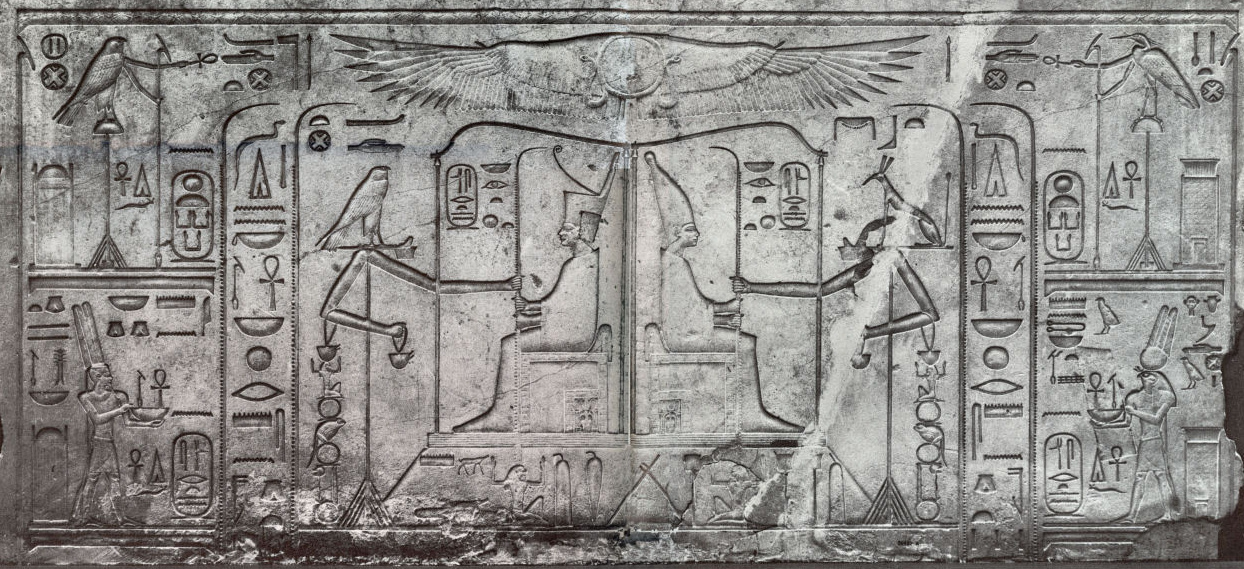
Lintel depicting Senusret III celebrating his Sed Festival.

The "Cycle of Songs in Honor of Senwosret III" is a series of 6 songs as part of the archive of papyri from Illahun. It is suggested by Adolf Erman that they were written and composed for the king in a town south of Memphis. The songs outline the responsibilities of the king and embody kingship ideology in the Middle Kingdom. This ideology includes protecting the unity of the two kingdoms, extending the borders of Egypt, striking fear in Egyptian enemies, and ensuring the success of his subjects. Though there is not a strong difference of hymns to living kings or dead kings, there is indication that these hymns were to be sung by the king's subjects while he was alive. A hymn reads "may he live for ever and eternity." He was often compared to Sekhmet in the hymns because of his iron fist and conquering of enemies. The hymn excerpts of the "Cycle of Songs in Honor of Senwosret III" that associate Senusret III with Sekhmet are:

He who fires an arrow as Sekhmet does,
he fells thousands of those unaware of his power
The tongue of his Person is the restraint on the Bow-land
and his commands are what set the nomads to flight
...
How great is the lord for his city! indeed he is Sekhmet against the enemies who tread on his border

Clearly, the identities of the Sekhmet and Senusret III are repeatedly juxtaposed. The cult of the king after his passing lasted for roughly 300 years at South Abydos.

=== Succession ===
==== Coregency ====
In Year 19 of Senusret III, I Akhet Day 1 (New Year), he became senior coregent (Osiris) by appointing his son Amenemhat III as junior coregent (Horus). A double-dated papyrus in the Berlin Museum shows Year 19 of his reign next to Year 1 of his son, Amenemhat III; generally, this is presumed to be a proof for a coregency with his son. A coregency may indicate that Senusret III, who had been exceptionally active on military campaigns, no longer was fit to travel the country and conduct military campaigns retiring to Abydos in Year 19, while Amenemhat III took over these duties. It also may explain Senusret III associating himself with Osiris at Abydos.

==== Reign length ====
The highest attested date of Senusret III is the papyrus dated to Year 19.

The Turin King List 6:24 reads: "[The Dual King Nebkaura ...] 30+ x years." This indicates that Senusret III reigned more than 30 regnal years.

According to Josef Wegner, a Year 39 hieratic control note was recovered on a white limestone block from:

...a securely defined deposit of construction debris produced from the building of the Senwosret III mortuary temple. The fragment itself is part of the remnants of the temple construction. This deposit provides evidence for the date of construction of the mortuary temple of Senwosret III at Abydos.

Wegner stresses that it is unlikely that Amenemhat III, Senusret's son and successor, would still be working on his father's temple nearly two decades into his own reign. He notes that the only possible explanation for the block's existence at the project is that Senusret III had a 39-year reign, with the final 20 years in coregency with his son Amenemhat III. Since the project was associated with a project of Senusret III, his Regnal Year was presumably used to date the block, rather than Year 20 of Amenemhat III. Wegner interprets this as an implication that Senusret was still alive in the first two decades of his son's reign.

Wegner's hypothesis is rejected by some scholars, such as Pierre Tallet and Harco Willems; according to them, it is more likely that such a coregency never occurred, and that the Year 39 control note still refers to Amenemhat III, who may have ordered some additions to Senusret's monuments.

== Royal Court ==
His court included the viziers Nebit and Khnumhotep. Ikhernofret worked as treasurer for the king at Abydos. Sobekemhat was treasurer too and buried at Dahshur. Senankh cleared the canal at Sehel for the king. Horkherty was king's acquaintance.

== Death ==
=== Pyramid ===
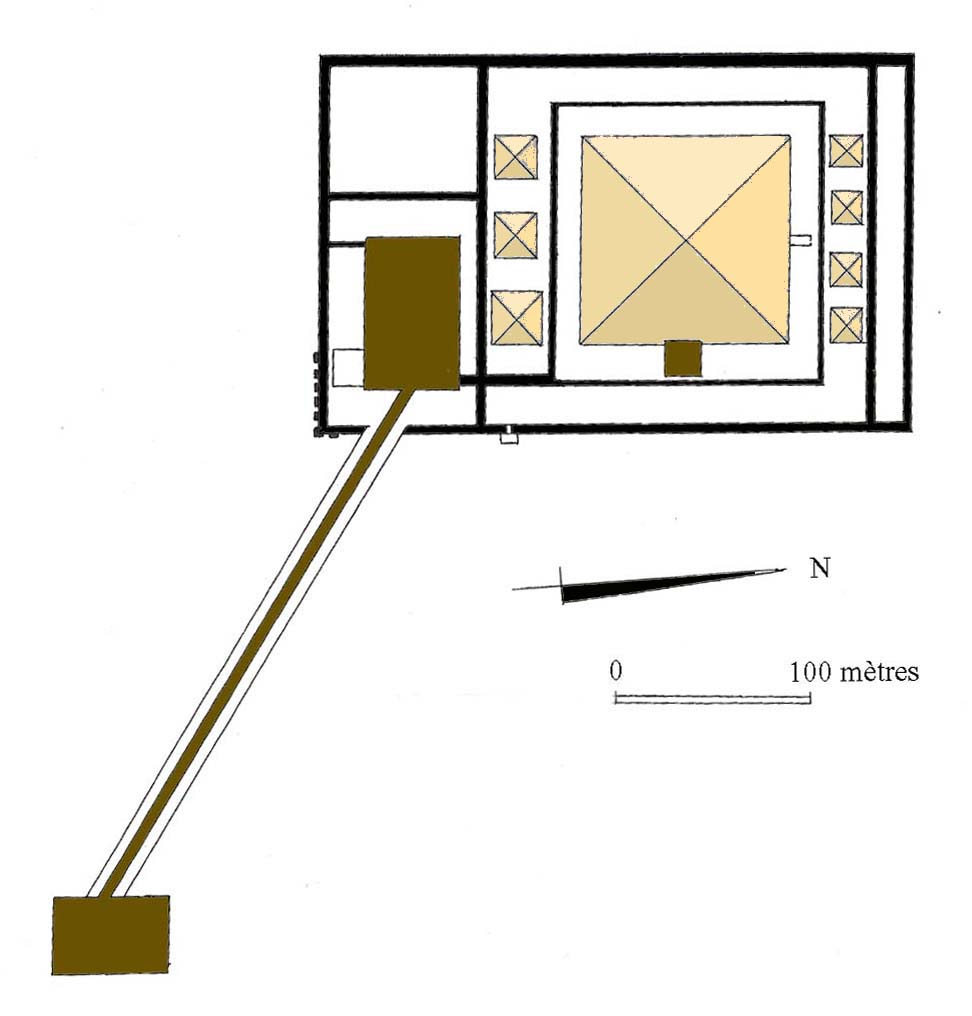
Plan of the Pyramid complex at Dashur

Senusret's pyramid complex was built north-east of the Red Pyramid of Dashur. It far surpassed those from the early twelfth dynasty in size, grandeur, and underlying religious conceptions.

The complex of pyramids was constructed in 2 phases. Originally, it was designed to follow Old Kingdom pyramids which included the structure itself, an eastern pyramid temple, and a stone wall encircling the complex. The second phase included an outer brick wall which was surrounded by 6 smaller pyramids for the royal queens. There is also an underground gallery with further burials for royal women. Here were found the treasures of Sithathor and queen Mereret. The final, seventh, pyramid served as the king's ka pyramid with a statue of himself inside for worship. There was also a southern temple, however this has since been destroyed.

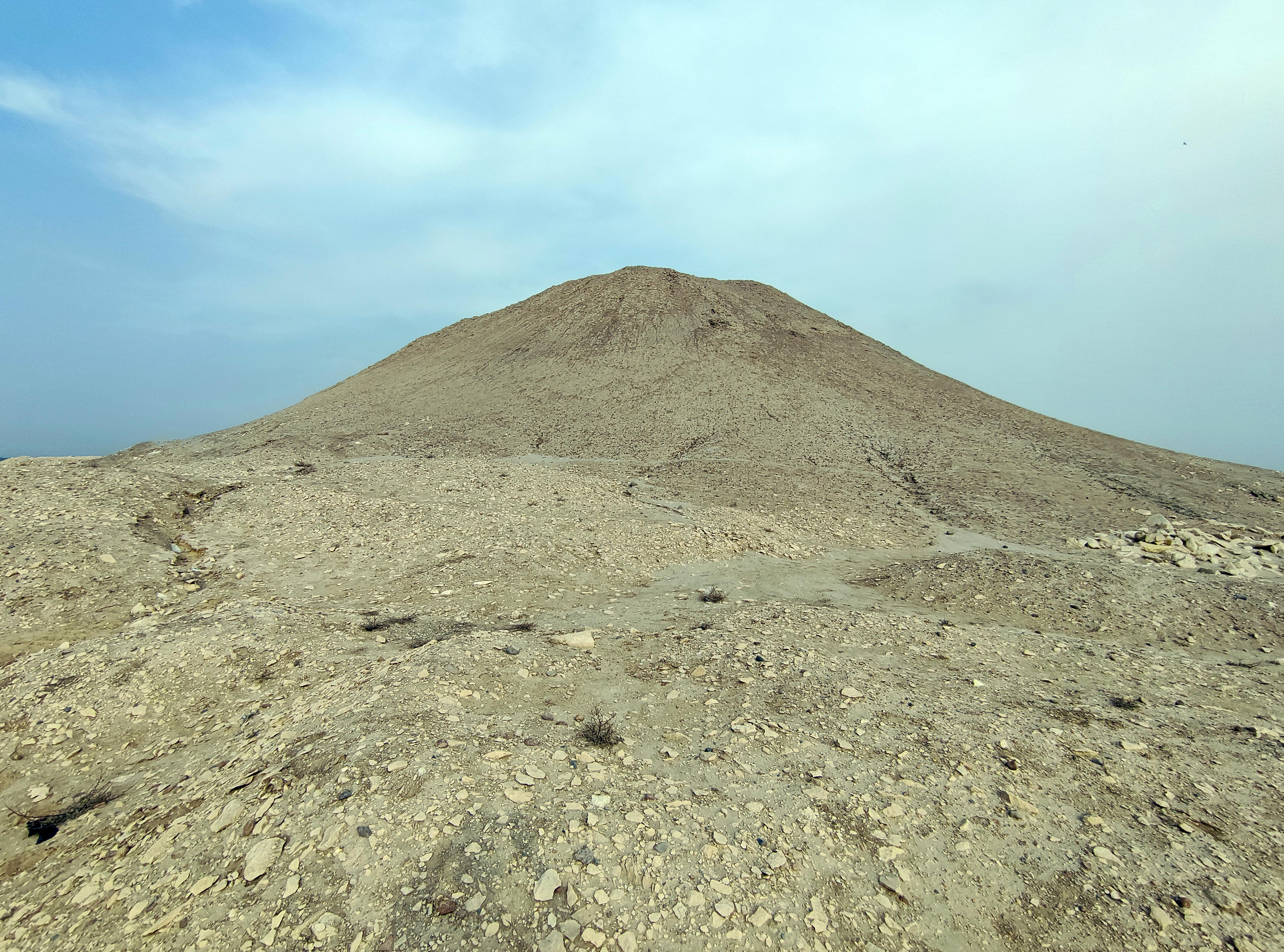
Ruins of Pyramid of Senusret III at Dahshur

The base of Senusret's pyramid is 105 meters and is 78 meters high. The total volume was approximately 288,000 cubic meters. The pyramid was built of a core of mud bricks. They were not made a consistent size implying that standardized moulds were not used. The burial chamber was lined with granite. Above the vaulted burial chamber was a second relieving chamber that was roofed with five pairs of limestone beams each weighing 30 tons. Above this was a third mudbrick vault.

=== Tomb at Abydos ===
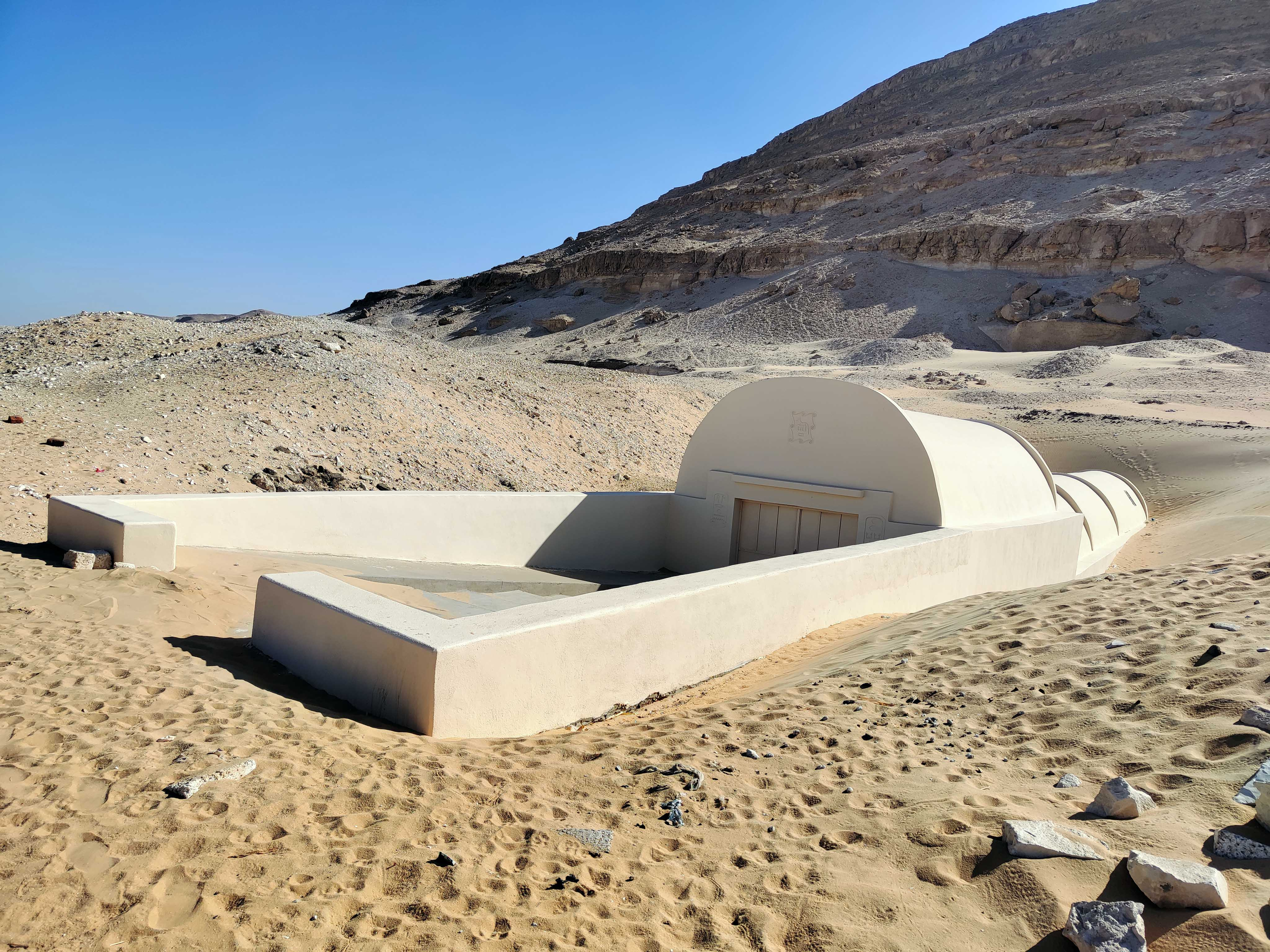
Modern Entrance to the Tomb of Senusret III, Abydos

There has been speculation that Senusret III was not necessarily buried at his pyramid, but rather in his sophisticated funerary complex in Abydos. Under this interpretation, his pyramid would be a cenotaph.

The Mortuary Temple at Abydos is 30 meters below the surface and extends below for 180 meters. It is located on the base of high desert cliffs and is focused on a subterranean royal tomb. Near the site, there is a town that houses administrators and priests dedicated to the cult of the late king. The mountain where the tomb is located was known as "The Mountain of Anubis" and was used as a conceptual link of Senusret and the gods. The design of the tomb is likely symbolically representing the descent of the sun into the realm of Osiris.

Senusret's tomb did not house any funerary goods and was robbed in ancient times, given that tomb robbers dug a tunnel to bypass the blocking system and ripped out the walls of the tomb to find the hidden sarcophagus. It's currently believed the plundering occurred at the end of the Thirteenth Dynasty. It would later develop into a center for funerary complexes and would include 11 kings whose rules date from the thirteenth century and the Second Intermediate Period.

The construction dates and inscriptions further suggest a coregency between Senusret III and Amenemhat III, according to Josef Wegner and Dieter Arnold. It shows that the construction of the temple was likely finished during the reign of Amenemhet III rather than he ordered the construction.

== Attestations ==
=== Royal statuary ===
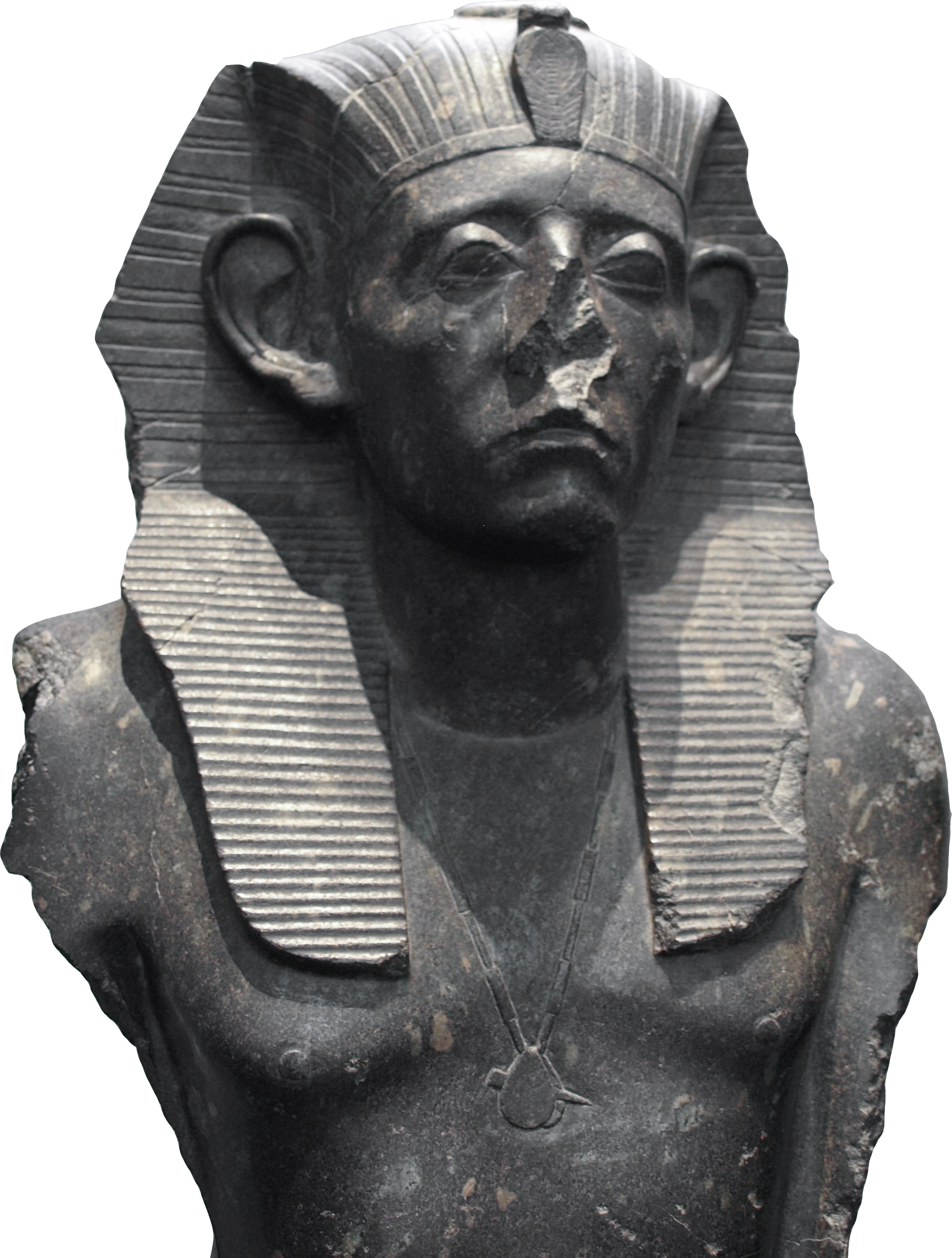
A statue of Senusret III at the British Museum, showing the traits that are peculiar for this king

Senusret III is well known for his distinctive statues. On them, the king is depicted at various stages of life. In particular, on the aged ones, he is shown with a somber expression characterized by protruding eyes, hollow sockets and pronounced lines or pouches under them. His mouth is rendered with a downward turn, and his ears are large and forward-facing. In contrast with the even-exaggerated realism of the head and, regardless of his age, the rest of the body is idealized as young and muscular, in the more classical pharaonic fashion.

Scholars could only make assumptions about the reasons why Senusret III chose to have himself portrayed in such a unique way, and polarized on two diverging opinions. Some argue that Senusret wanted to be represented as a lonely and disenchanted ruler, human before divine, consumed by worries and by his responsibilities. At the opposite, other scholars suggested that the statues originally would convey the idea of a dreadful tyrant able to see and hear everything under his strict control.

More recently, it has been suggested that the purpose of such peculiar portraiture was not to represent realism, but rather, to reveal the perceived nature of royal power at the time of Senusret's reign.

== Gallery ==
Senwosret III's name in hieroglyphs

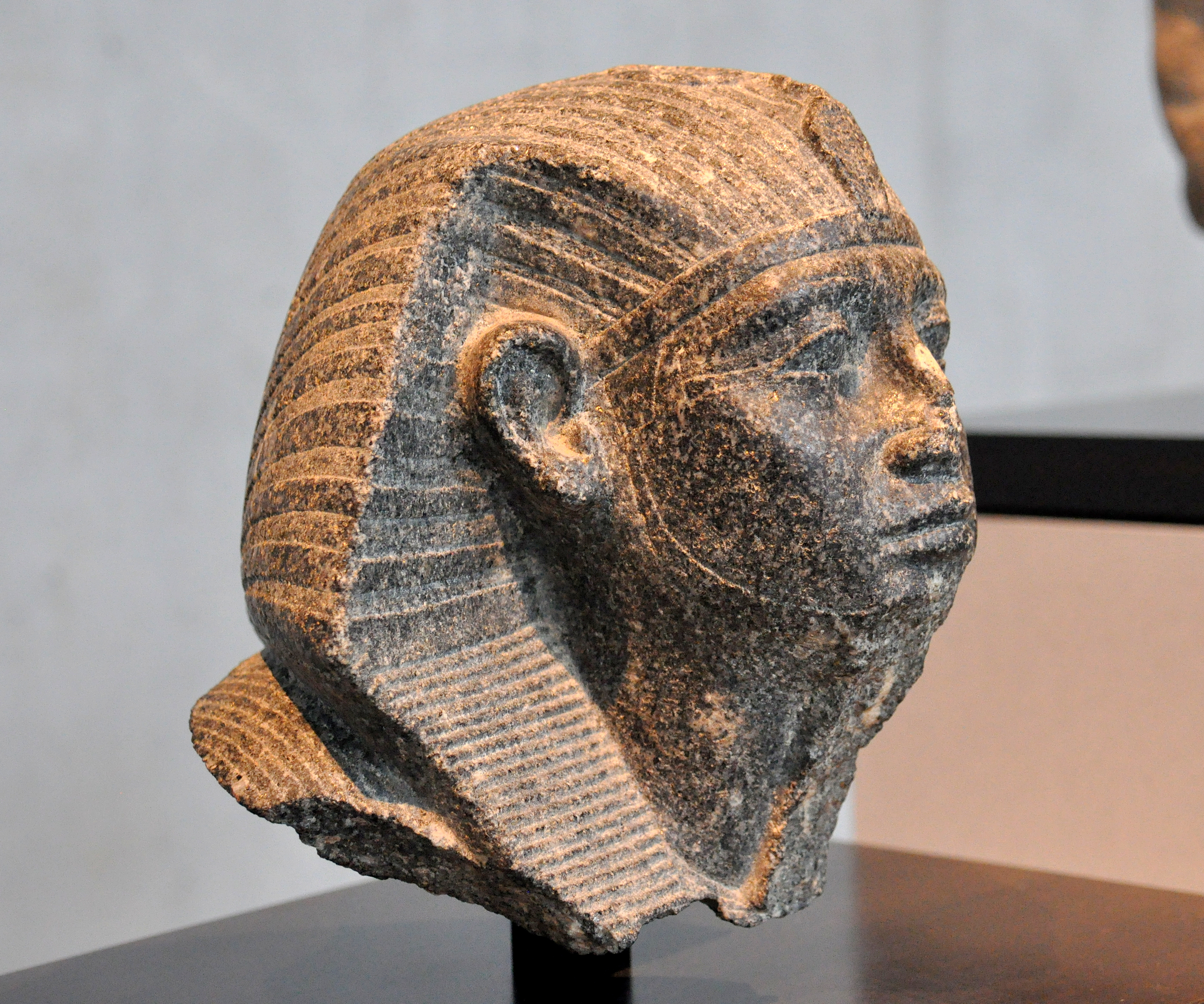
Head of Senusret III with youthful features. 12th Dynasty, c. 1870 BC. State Museum of Egyptian Art, Munich

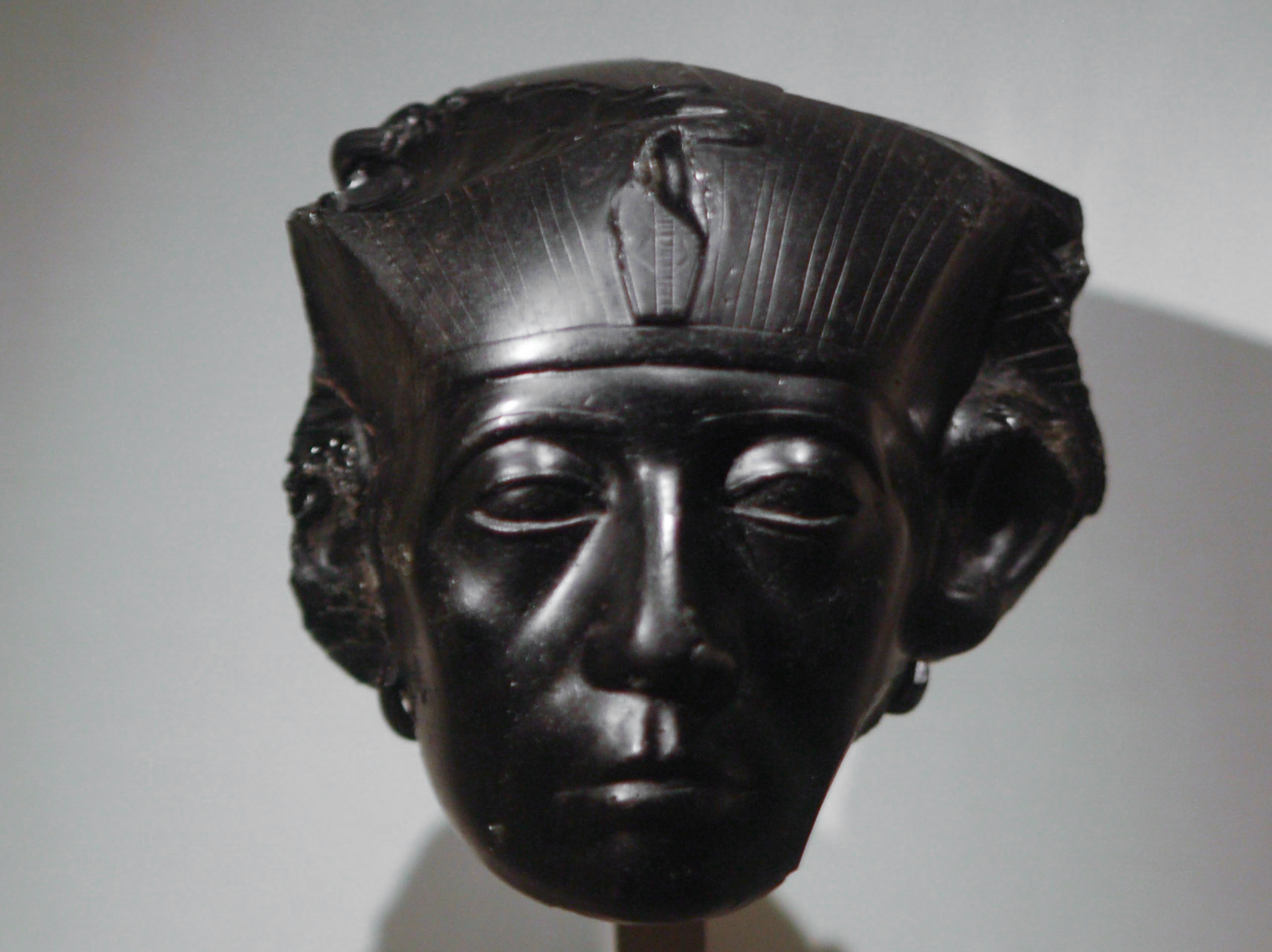
Head of King Senusret III in the Calouste Gulbenkian Museum, being one of the few statue heads with its nose intact

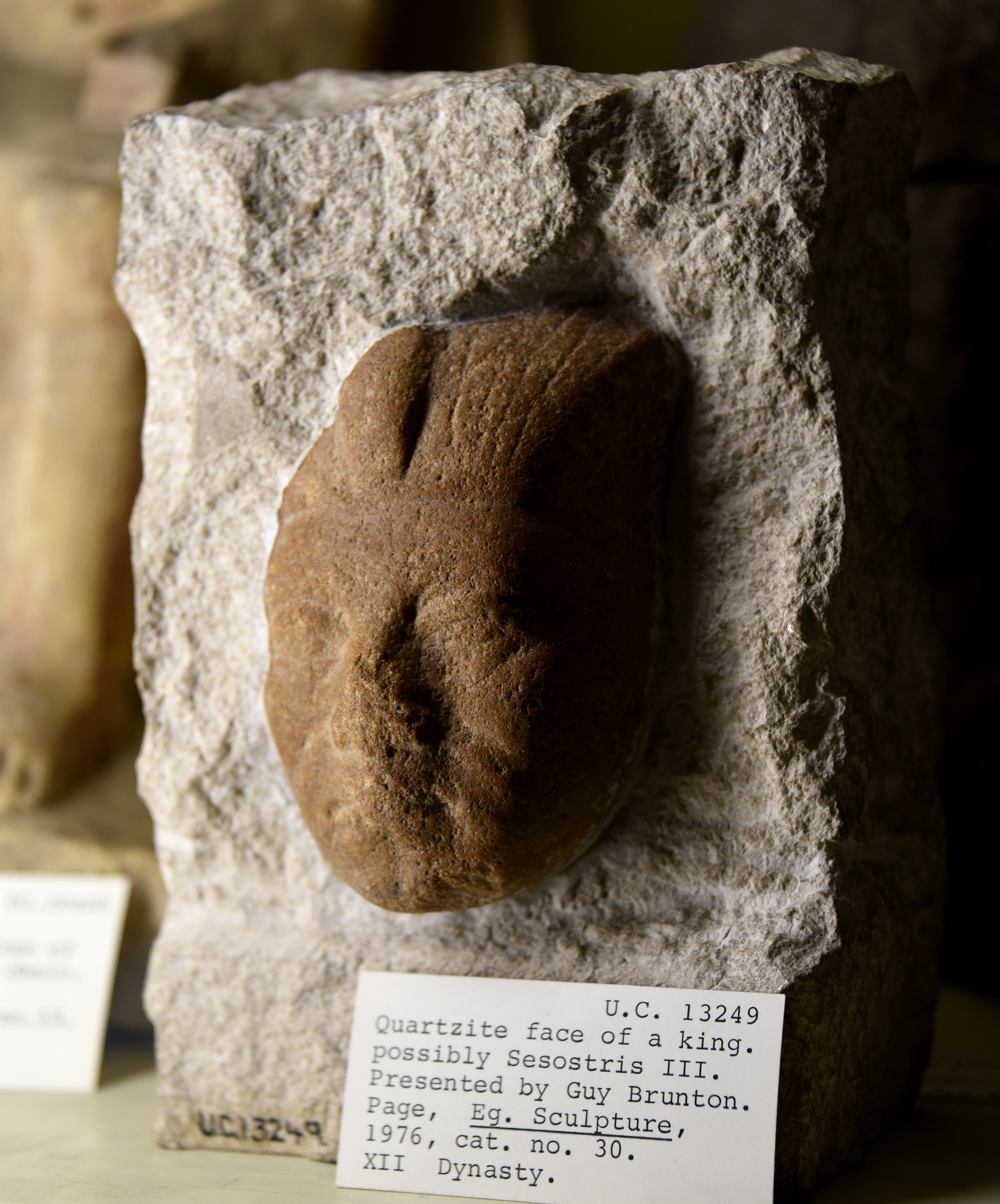
Face of a king, probably Senusret III, wearing the nemes royal headdress, Quartzite, 12th Dynasty, From Egypt. Presented by Guy Brunton, The Petrie Museum of Egyptian Archaeology, London.

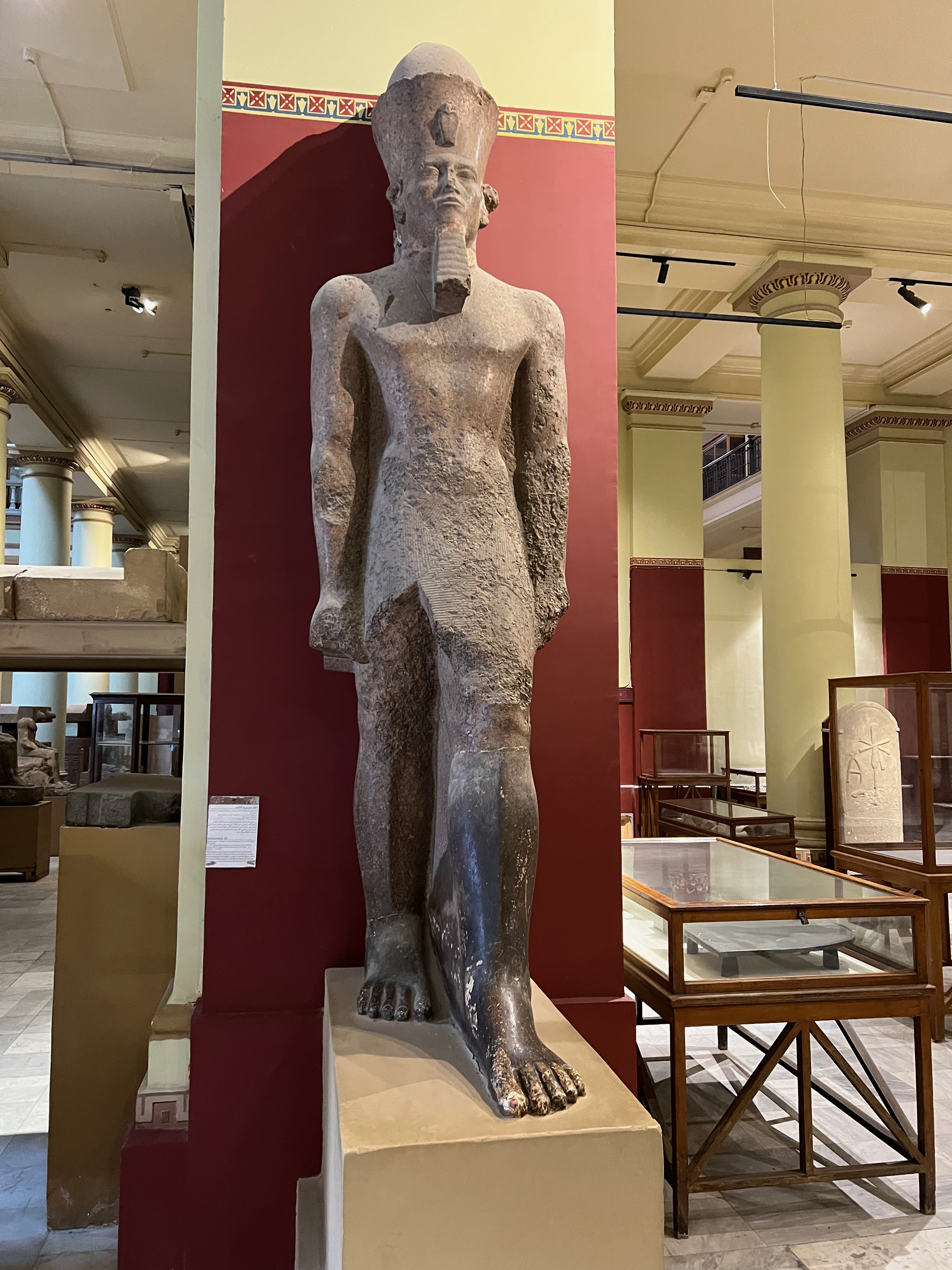
Egyptian Museum

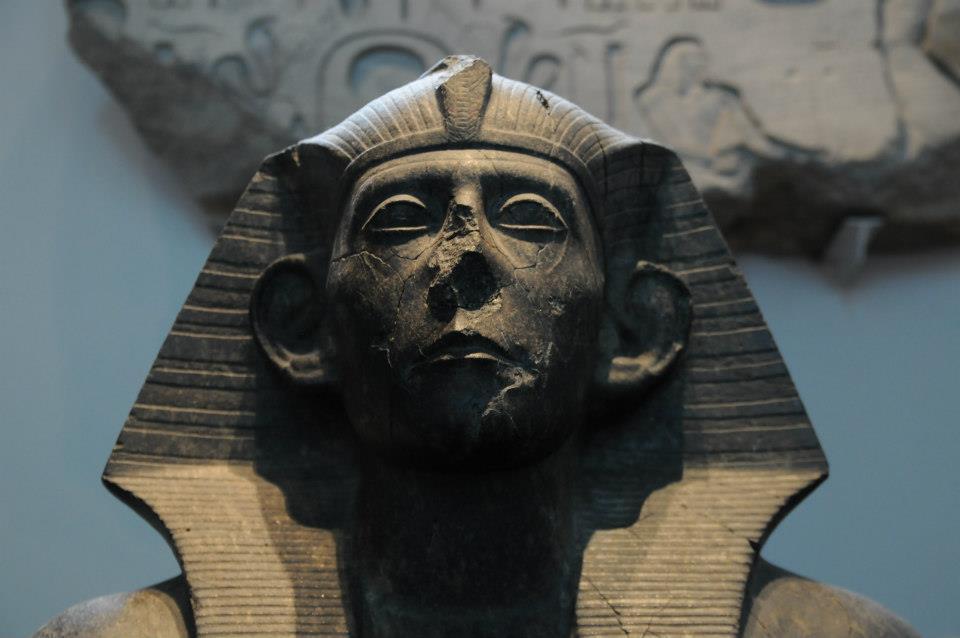
British Museum

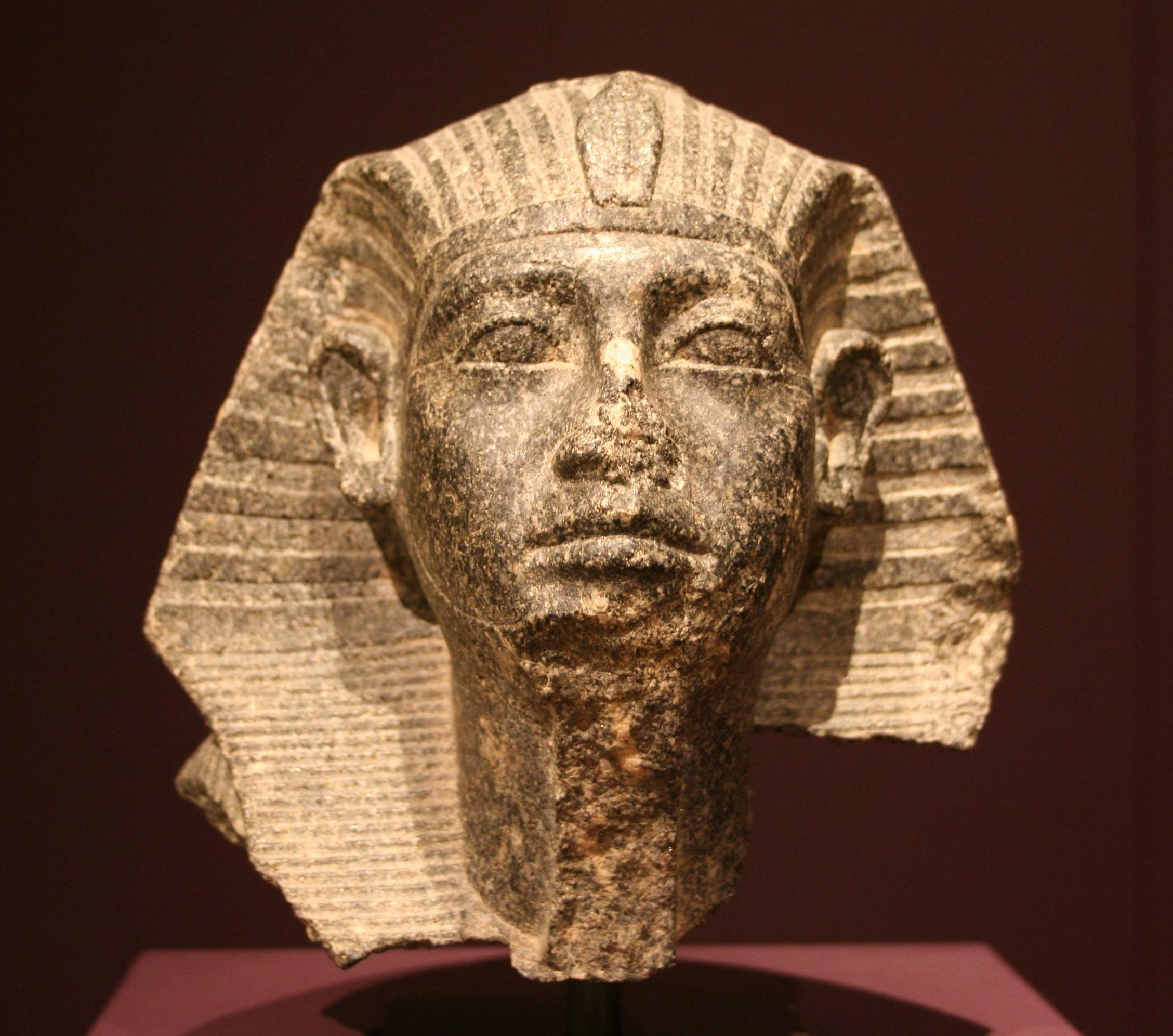
Munich, Staatliche Sammlung für Ägyptische Kunst

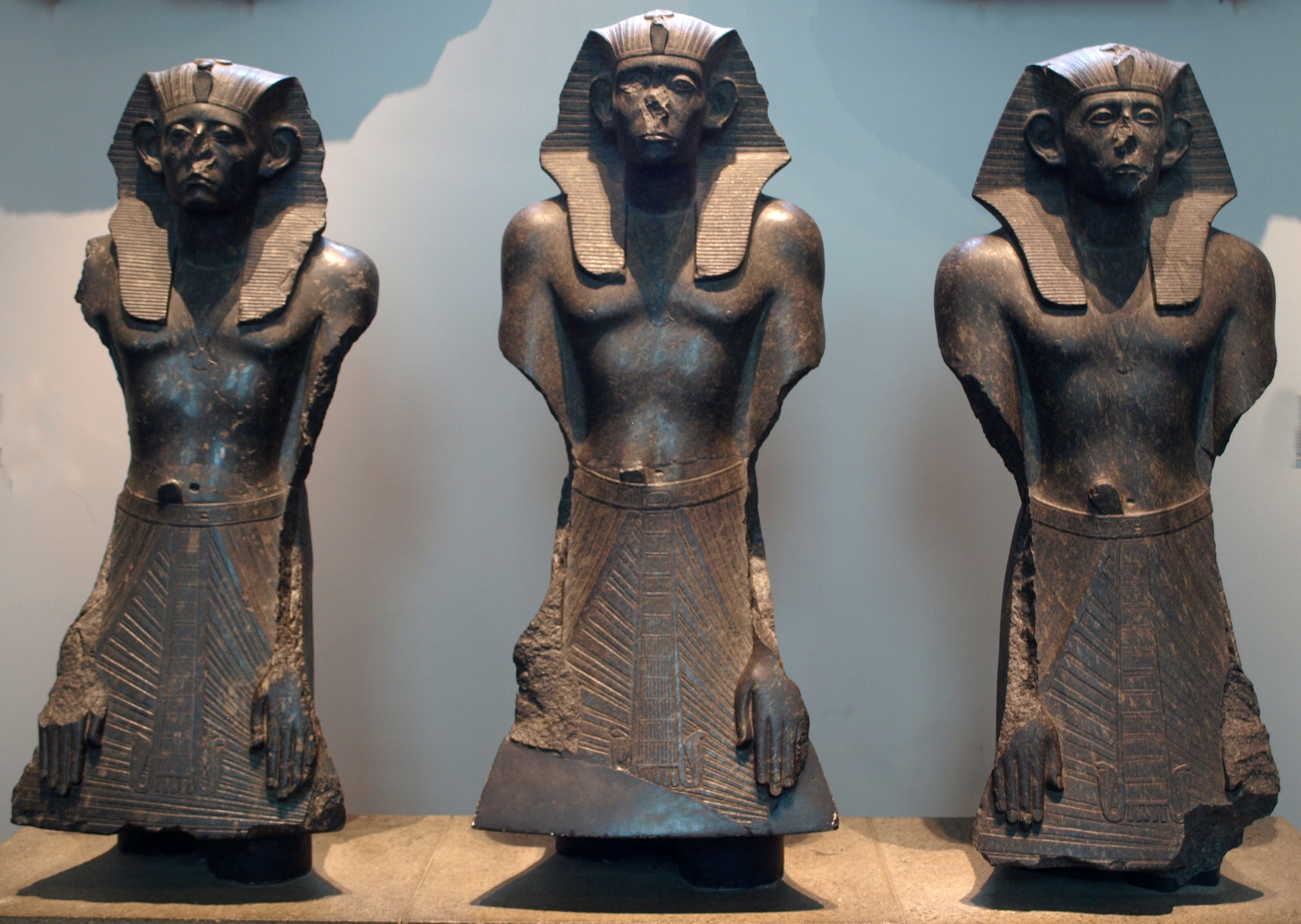
British Museum

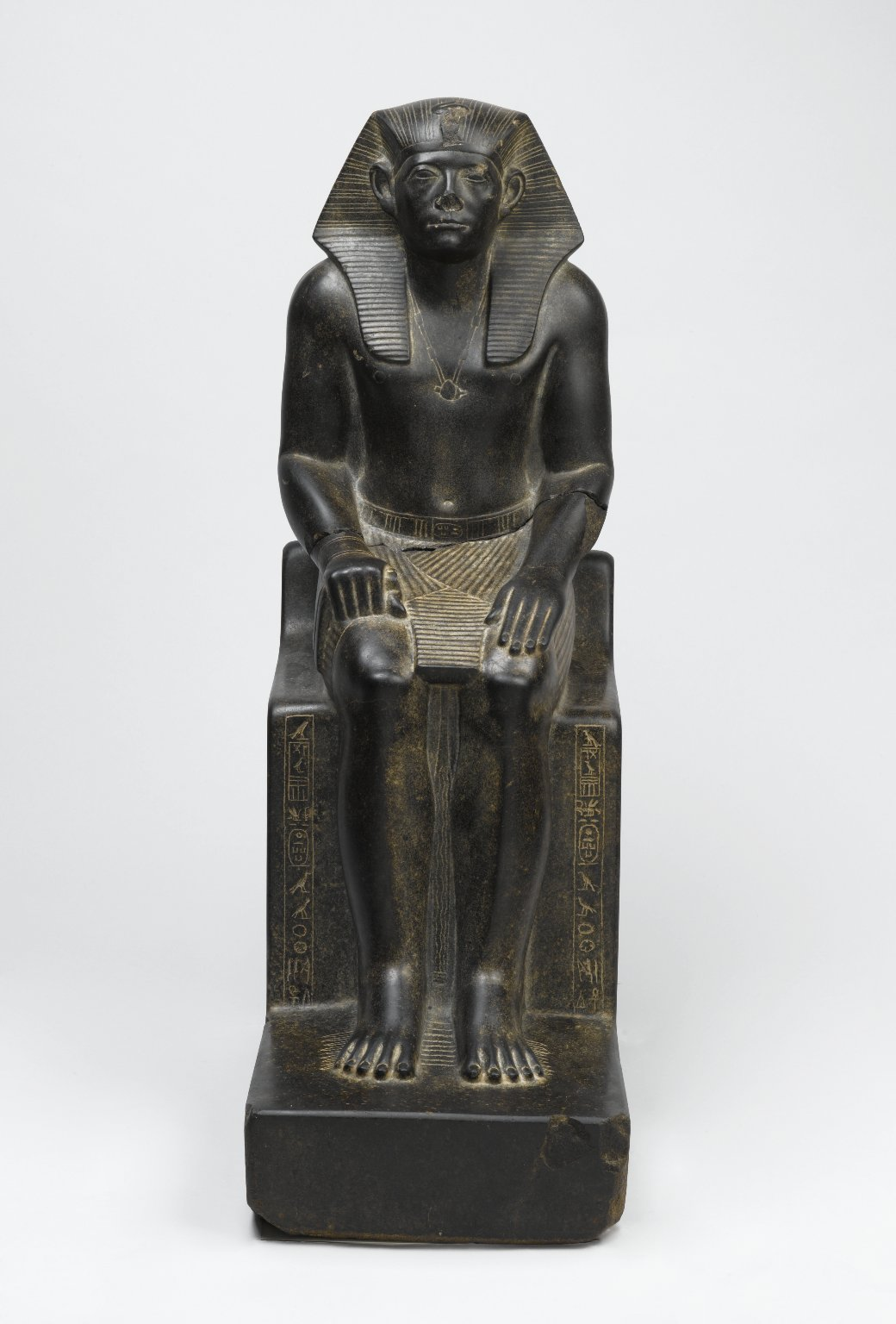
Brooklyn Museum, One of the few intact statues of Senusret III

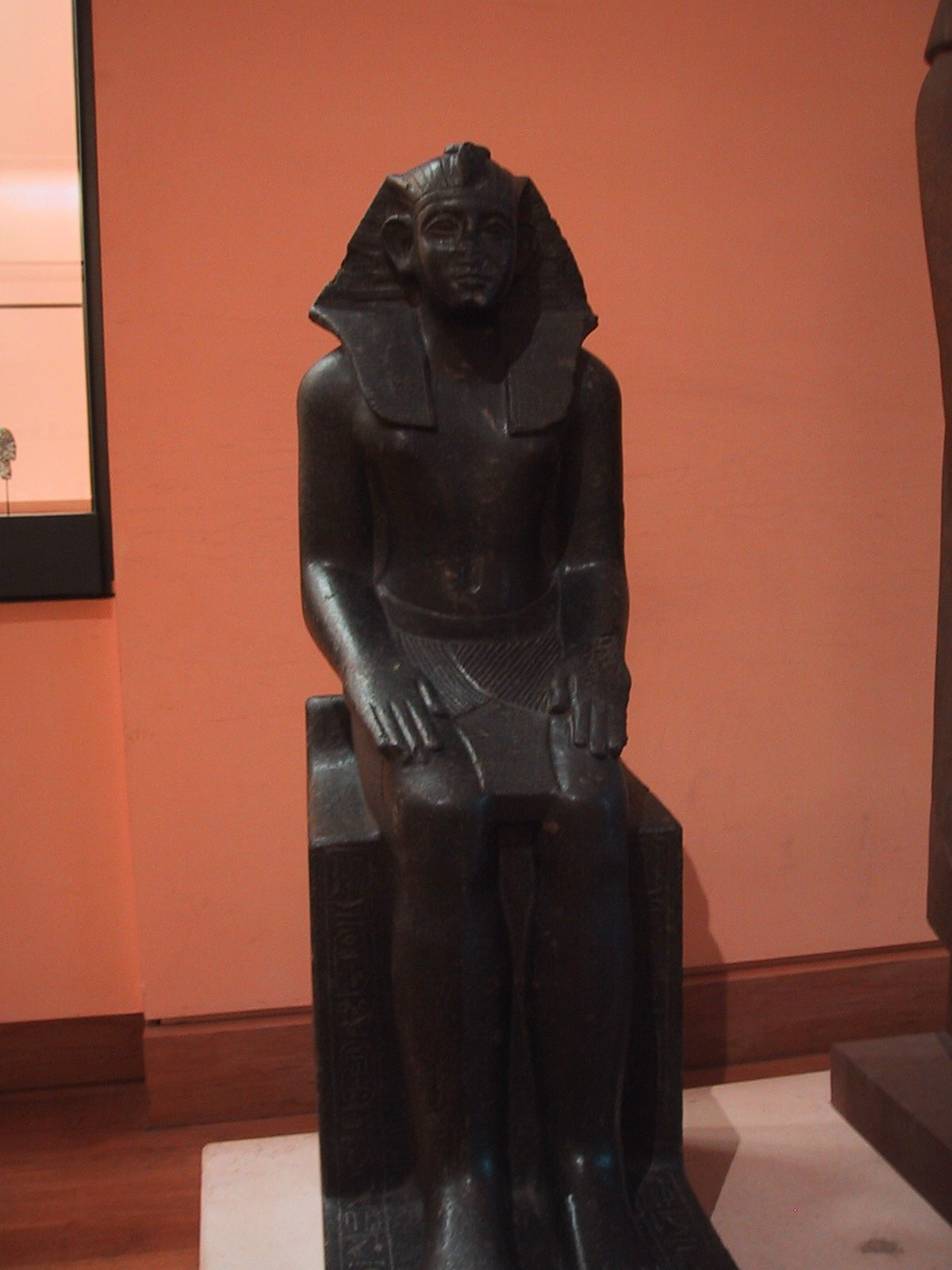
Louvre

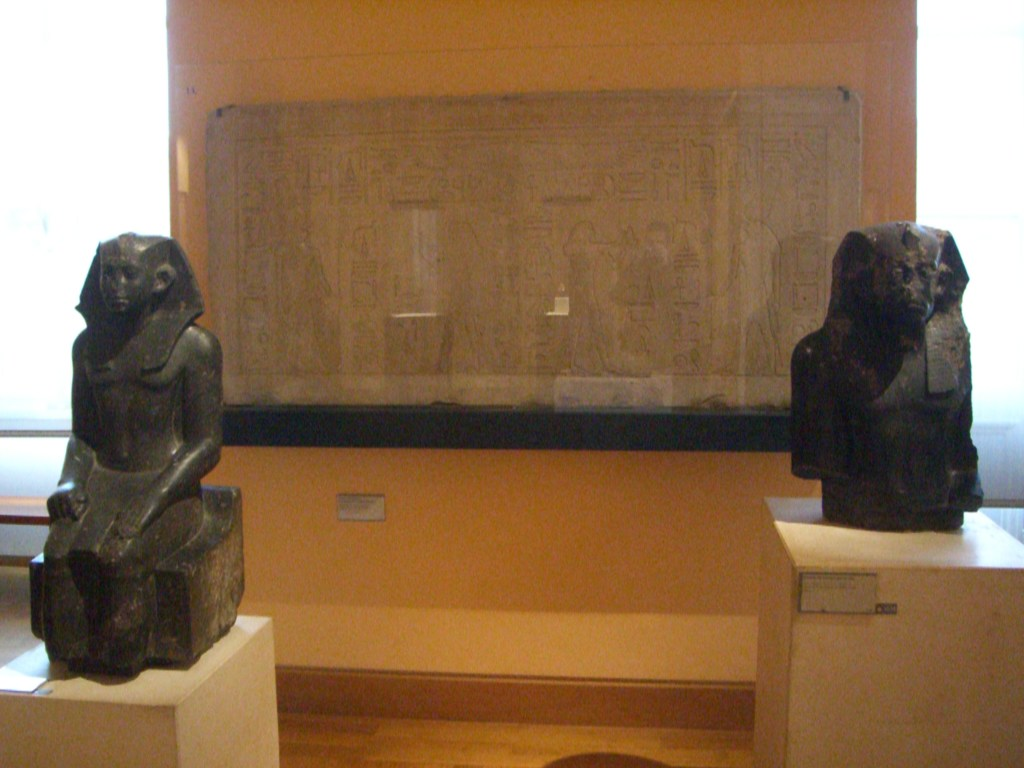
Louvre

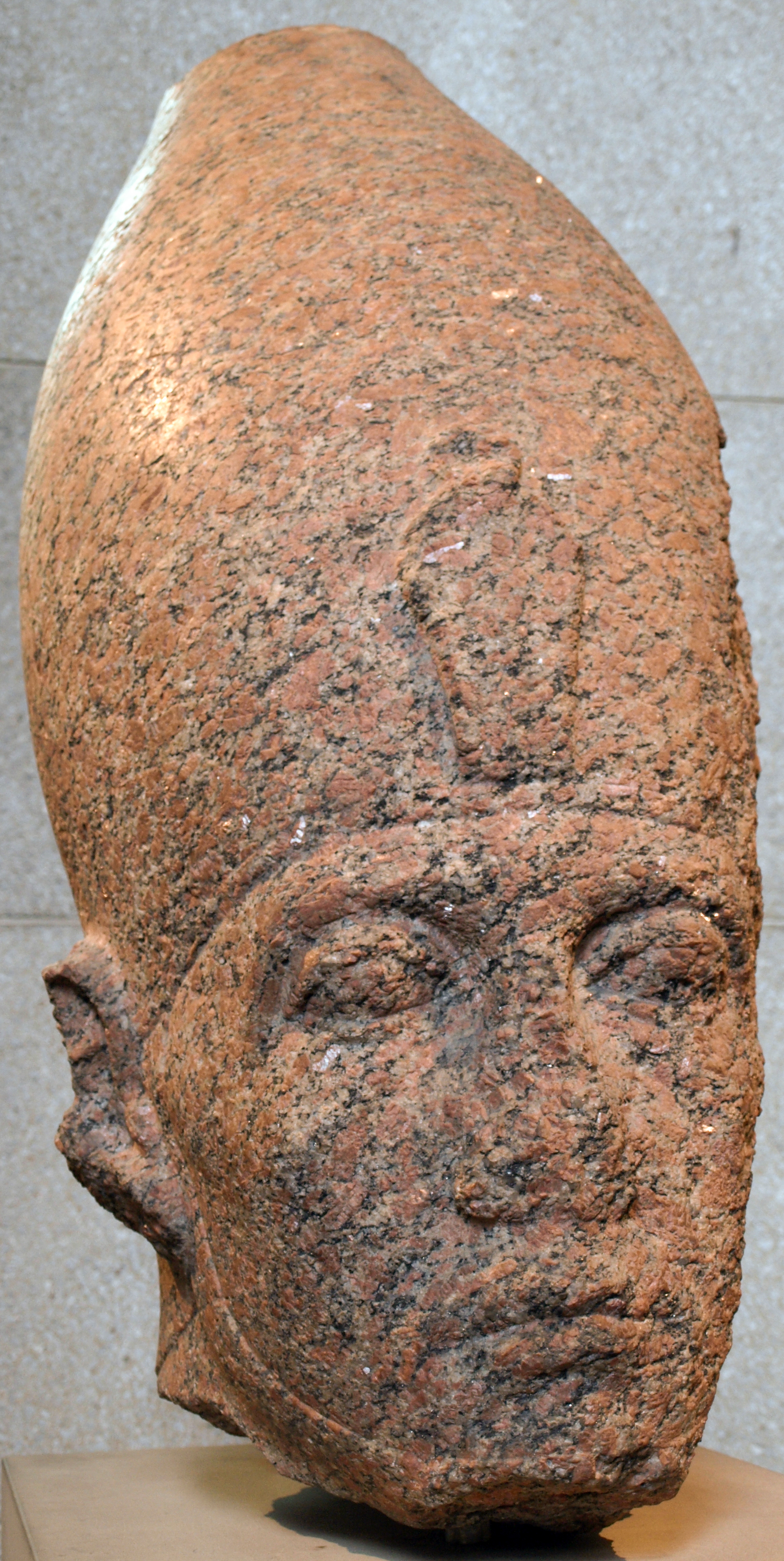
British Museum

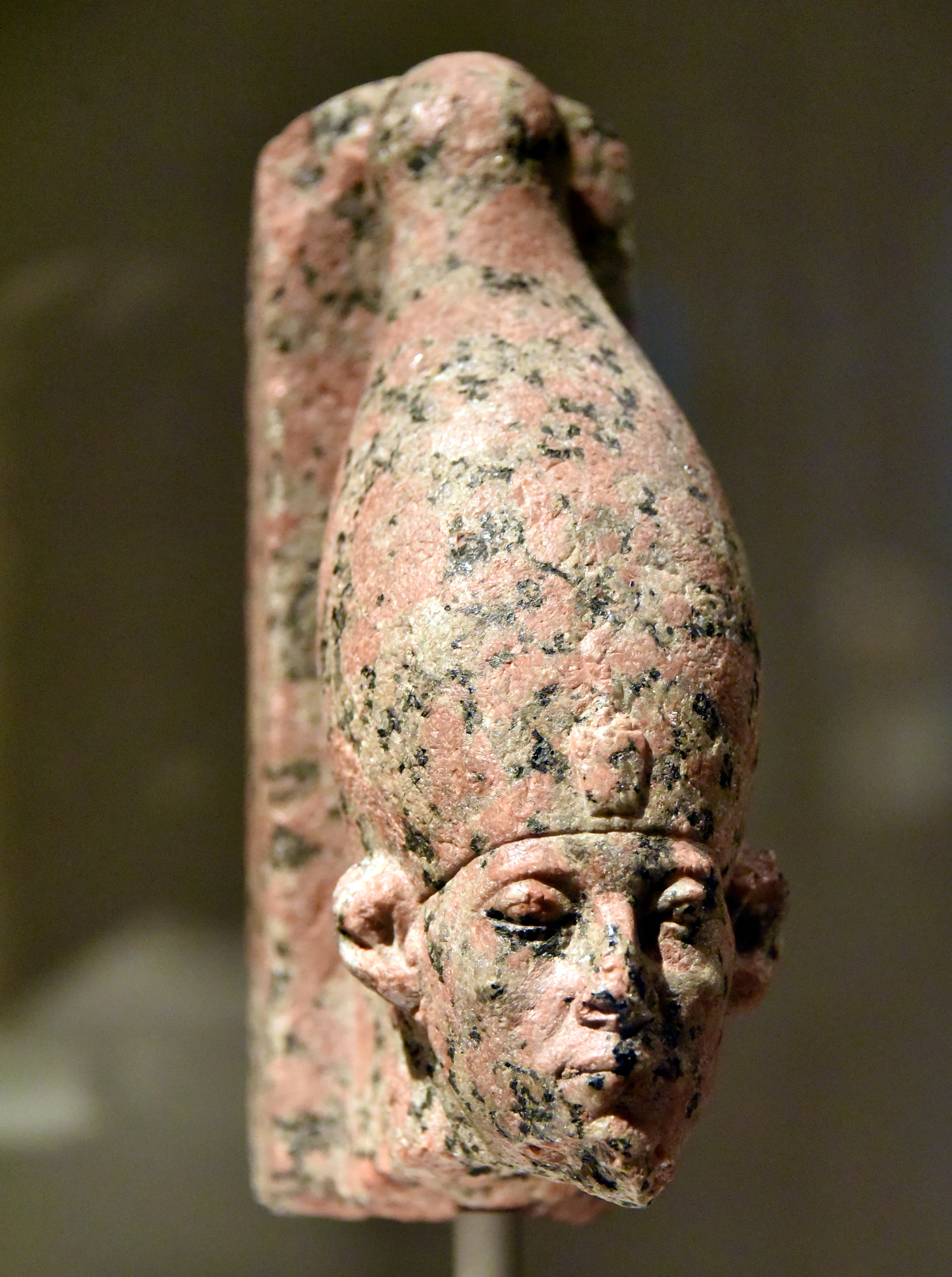
Berlin Museum

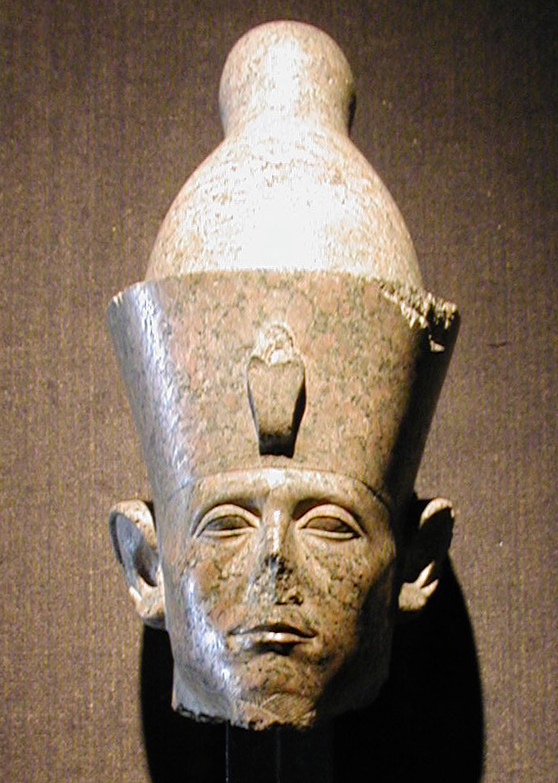
Luxor Museum

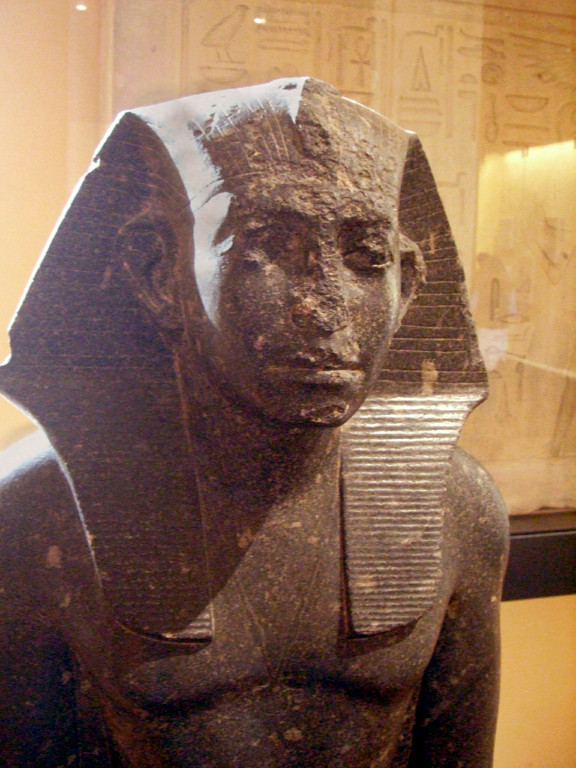
Louvre

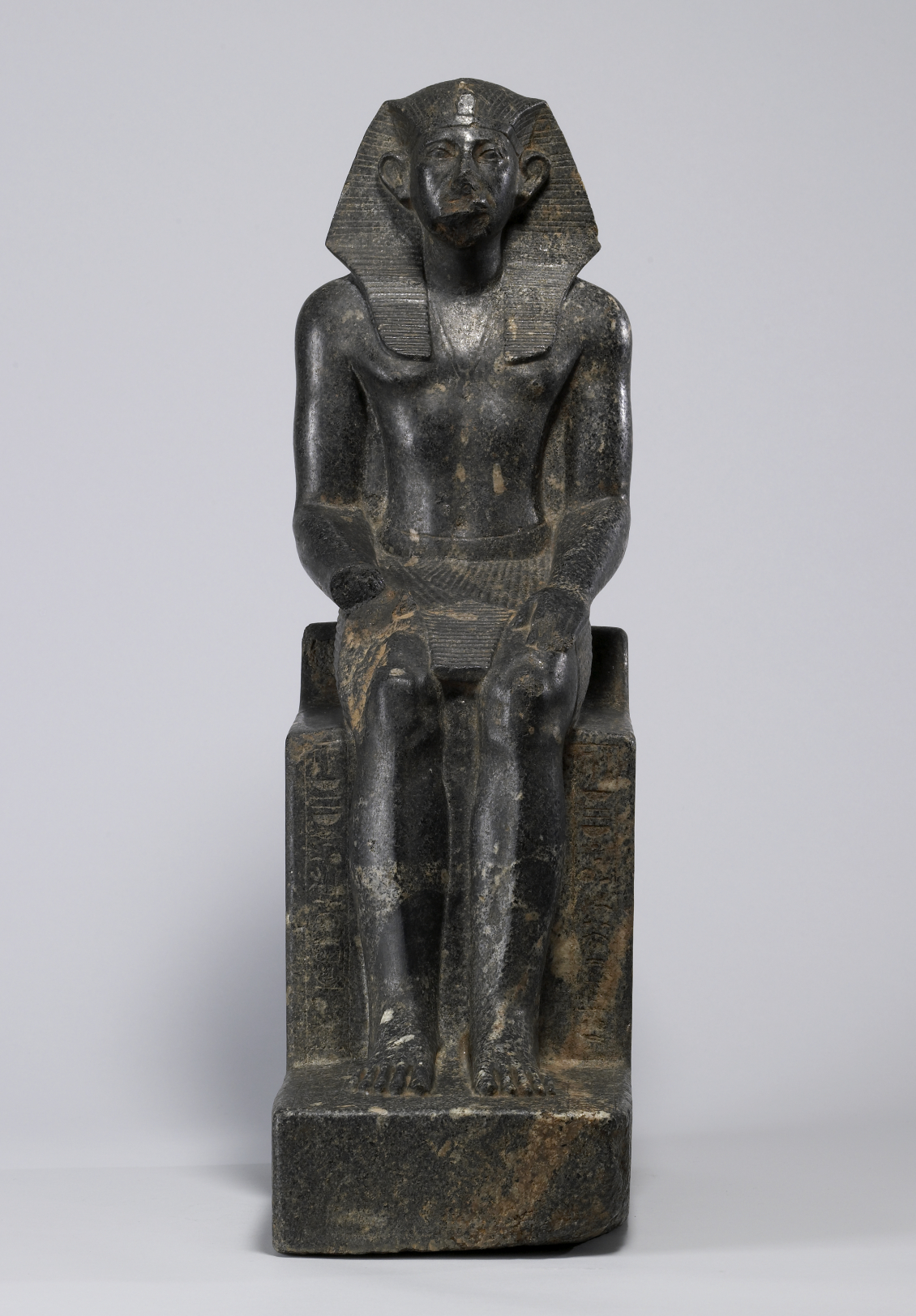
Walters Art Museum

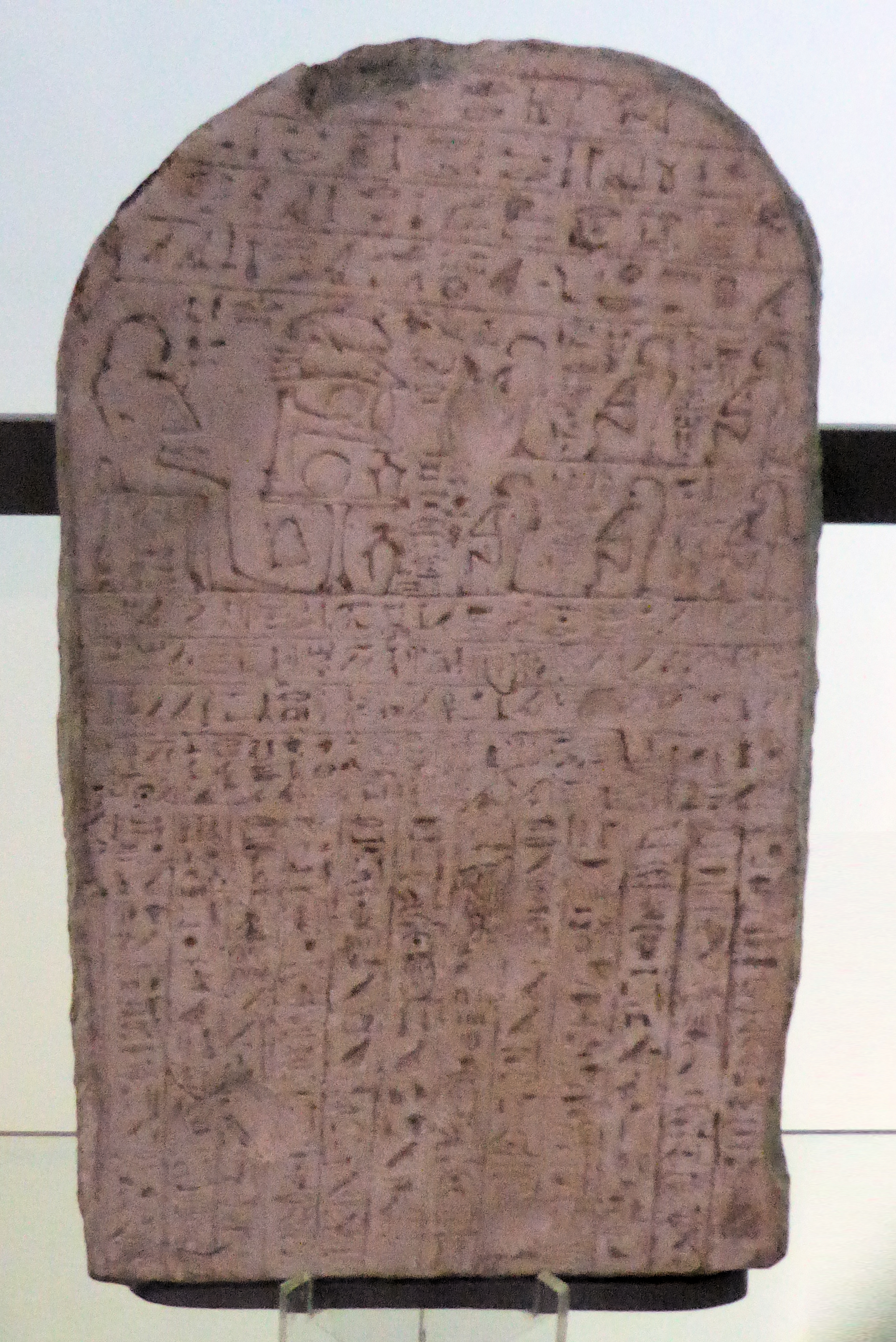
Sebek-khu Stele, describing the campaign to Canaan

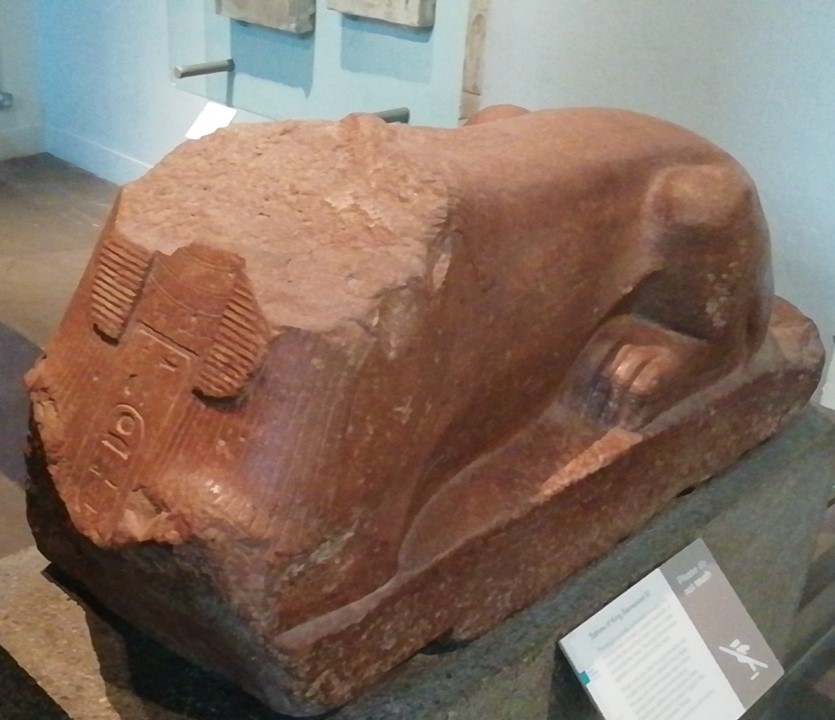
British Museum

British Museum Senwosret's name on belt from the three statues (far right)

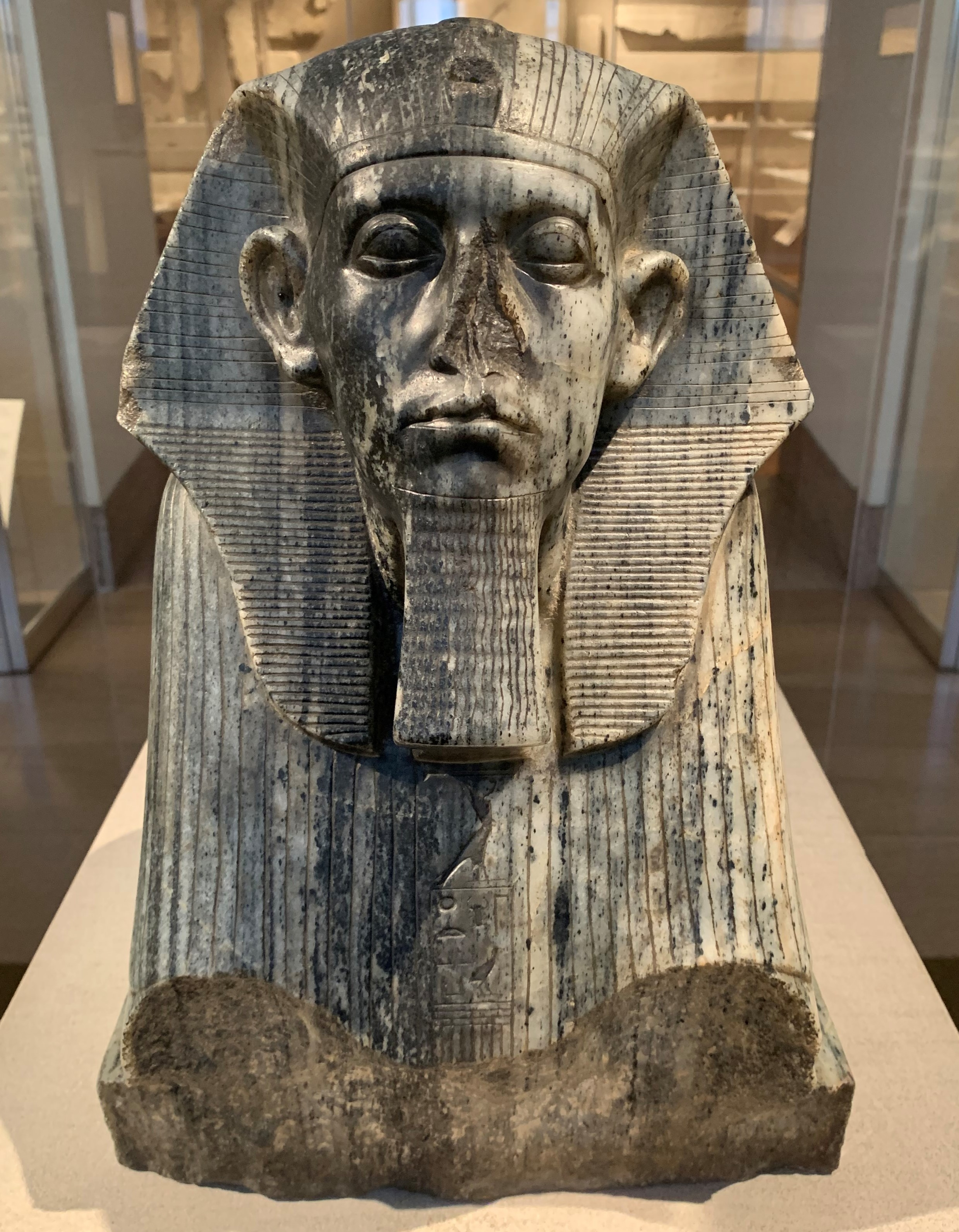
Senusret III, MET Museum NYC

== See also ==
- List of pharaohs

== Bibliography ==
- Dieter Arnold, The Tombs of Senwosret III, in: Konstantin C. Lakomy, Sabah Abdel Razik Saddik and Rafed El-Sayed (ed.), Egypt's Greatest Treasure. Studies in Egyptology, Museology and Archaeology in Honour of Wafaa T. El-Saddik (Wiesbaden, 2025), 556 pages, 179 illustrations b/w, 687 illustrations color, hardback, Reichert Verlag (Publishing) TOC, pp.97–106 PDF
- Dieter Arnold (with contributions by Adela Oppenheim & James P. Allen), The Pyramid Complex of Senwosret III at Dahshur: Architectural Studies, Metropolitan Museum of Art, New York, 2002 PDF
- W. Grajetzki, The Middle Kingdom of Ancient Egypt: History, Archaeology and Society, Duckworth, London 2006 ISBN 0-7156-3435-6, 51–58.
- Josef Wegner, The Nature and Chronology of the Senwosret III–Amenemhat III Regnal Succession: Some Considerations based on new evidence from the Mortuary Temple of Senwosret III at Abydos, JNES 55, Vol.4, (1996), p. 249–279.
