= Sobekemhat =

Sobekemhat was an ancient Egyptian treasurer under the king Senusret III in the Twelfth Dynasty. Sobekemhat is only known from his mastaba excavated in 1894 next to the pyramid of Senusret III at Dahshur. The mastaba was decorated on the outside with reliefs. These were only found in small fragments, but the fragments record the name and the titles of Sobekemhat. On an offering table he bears the title of the treasurer. The mastaba is in a chain of three mastabas, north of the king's pyramid. It is closest to the pyramid. The next mastaba belongs to the vizier (Nebit) and the third to another high official, perhaps again a vizier. Therefore, it can be argued that Sobekemhat's tomb was the earliest of the three. For a long time it was thought that Sobekemhat was vizier, but the relief fragments with the vizier's title come from the mastaba of Nebit nearby.

== Literature ==
- Wolfram Grajetzki: Court Officials of the Egyptian Middle Kingdom, London 2009 p. 31-33 ISBN 978-0-7156-3745-6
