= Neferthenut =

nfr t H nw t

Queen consort of Egypt
- Tenure: c. 1860 BC
- King: Senusret III
- Spouse: Senusret III
- Dynasty: 12th Dynasty of Egypt
- Religion: Ancient Egyptian religion

Neferthenut (fl. c. 1860 BC) was an ancient Egyptian queen of the 12th Dynasty of Egypt. She was the wife of Senusret III.

== Biography ==
Senusret III married Neferthenut, daughter of [father] and born to [mother]. She held the titles: king’s wife, member of the elite (iryt-pat), and she who sees Horus and Seth (m33t-hrw-stsh). The latter title is known from the 4th to 6th dynasties for certain queens (cf. Meritites I (4th); Khentkaus II (5th); Ankhesenpepi II (6th)).

=== Small Pyramid ===
She is so far only known from her sarcophagus and from fragments from the chapel found next to her pyramid, which was part of the pyramid complex of Senusret III at Dahshur. Dieter Arnold, who re-excavated the pyramid complex and the tomb of the queen noted the low quality of the inscription on her sarcophagus, which is in stark contrast to the sarcophagi of other royal women buried next to the pyramid. Her tomb was found robbed, only two mace heads were discovered by Jacques Morgan who excavated the tomb first in 1894.
