= Mereret (12th Dynasty) =

Daughter of Ancient Egyptian king

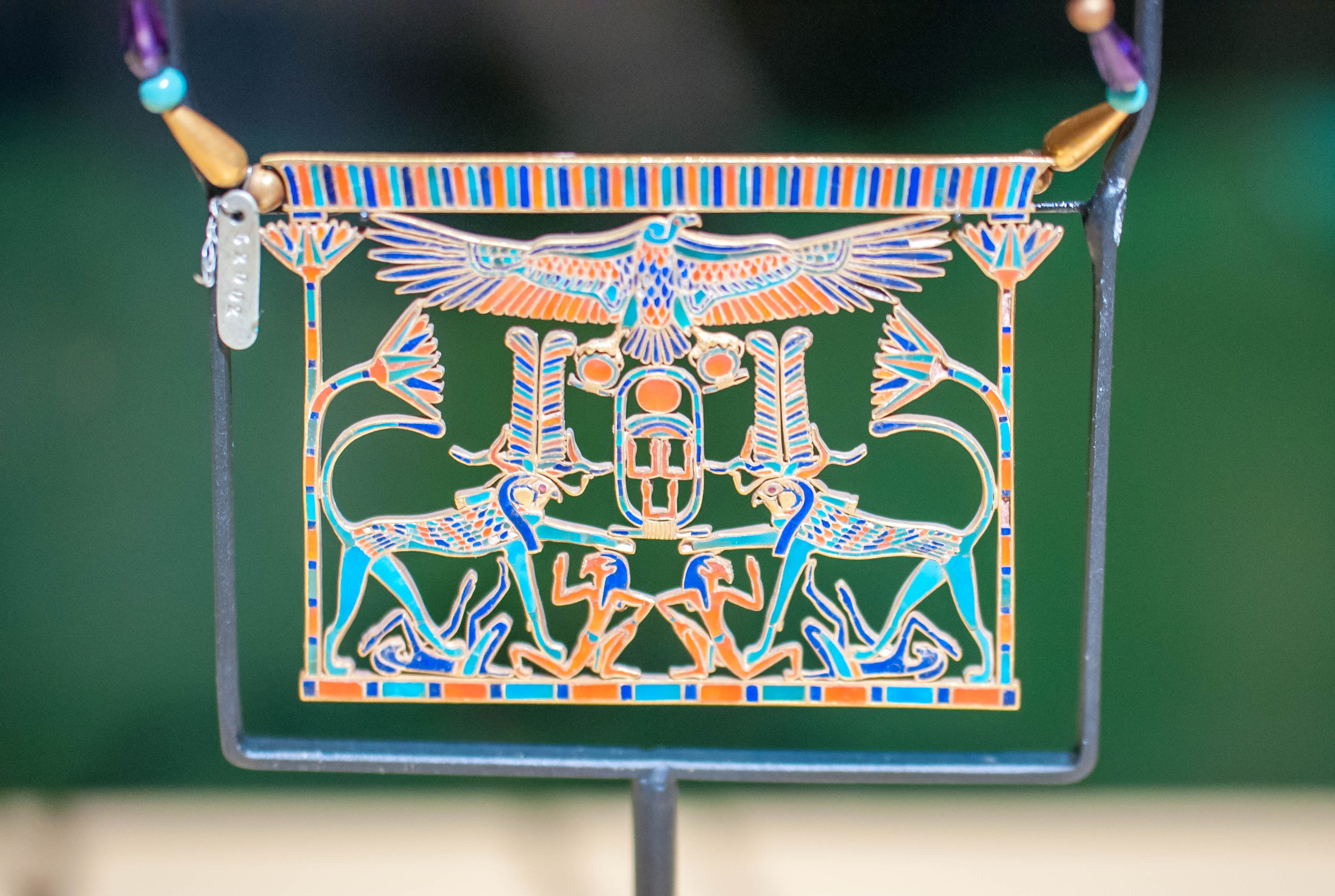
Pectoral of Senusret III from the jewellry box of Mereret

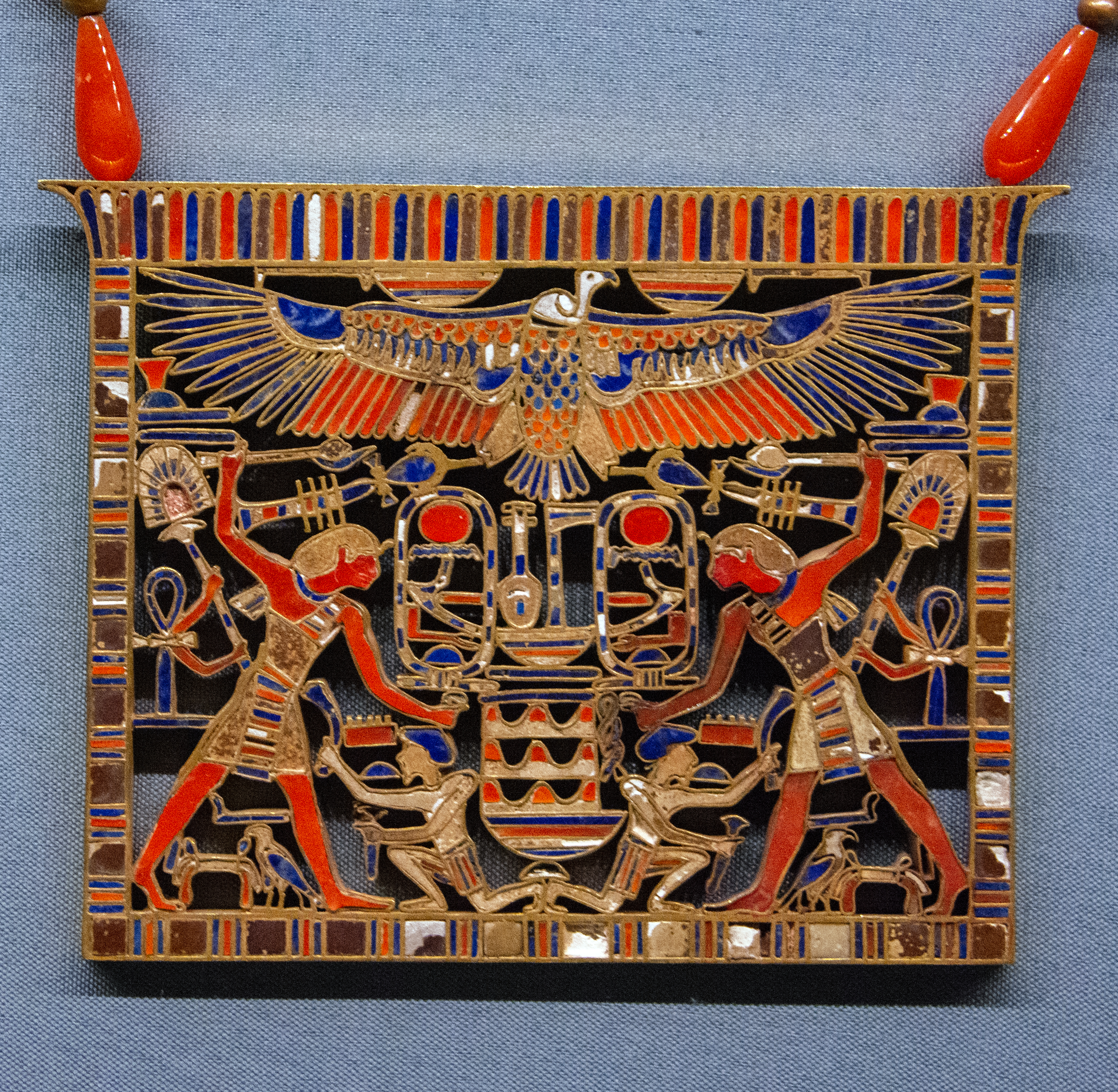
Pectoral of Amenemhet III from the jewellery box of Mereret

Mereret (or Meret) was an Ancient Egyptian King's Daughter known from her burial next to the Pyramid of Pharaoh Senusret III (ruled about 1878 BC to 1839 BC) at Dahshur. On the north side of the king's pyramid was a row of four pyramids belonging to the king's wives. These pyramids were connected by an underground gallery. On the west side of the gallery were further burials arranged for women with the title king's daughter. They were buried in sarcophagi that were placed into niches. All burials were found looted. However, the robbers missed two boxes for jewellery which contained an outstanding collection of jewellery filled with personal adornments found in 1894 by Jacques de Morgan. One of these boxes must have belonged to a king's daughter Sithathor, the other box to a king's daughter with the name Mereret or Meret.

Not much else is known about Mereret. Her name, with different spellings, appears on several scarab seals found in the jewellery box. Here, she always bears the title King's Daughter. From the position of her burial it might be concluded that she was the daughter of King Senusret III. Among her personal adornments were also pieces with the name of King Amenemhet III, indicating that she might have died under that king (who was most likely her brother).

== Gallery ==
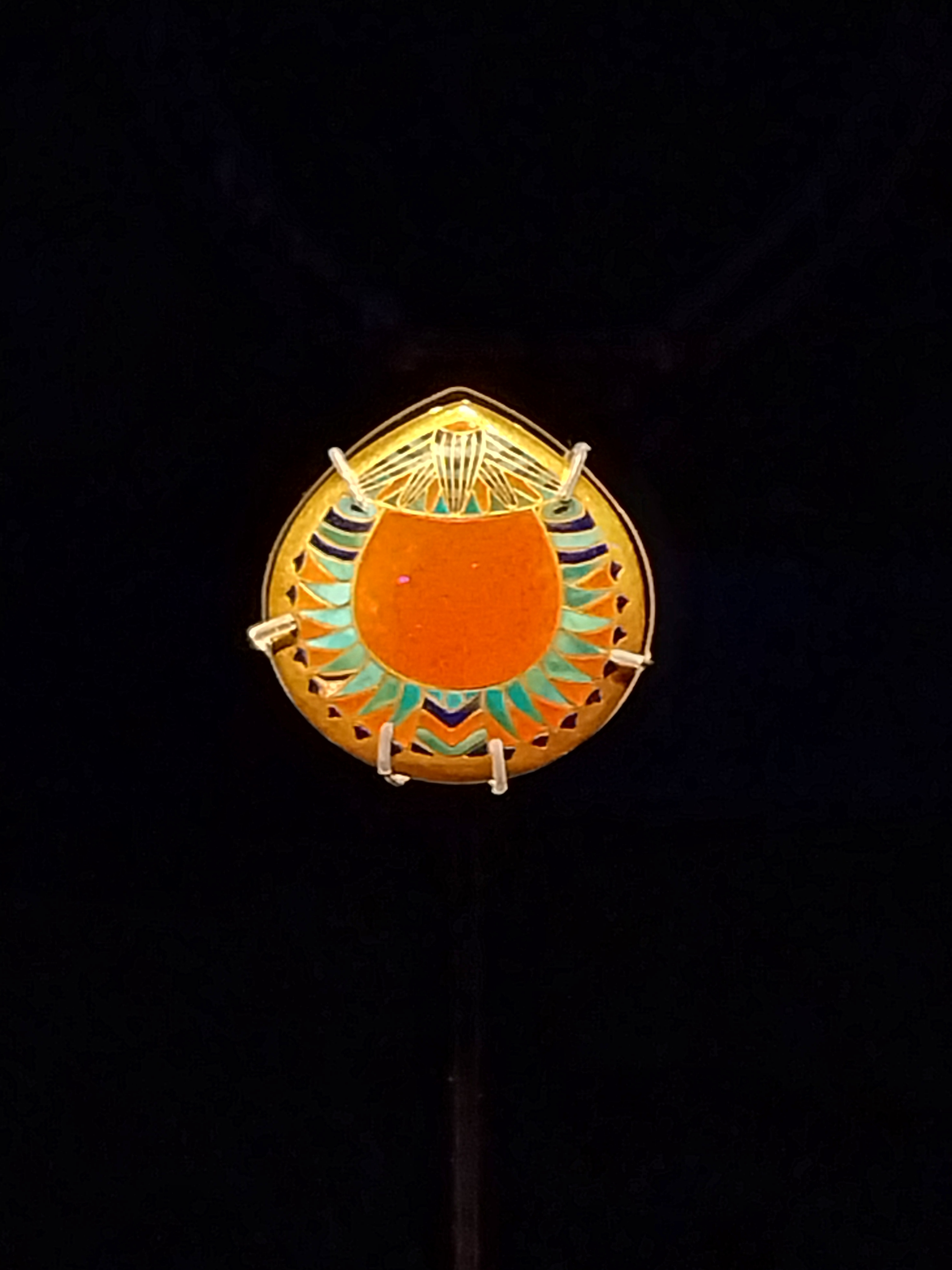
A Stunning pectoral of Mereret found in her tomb.

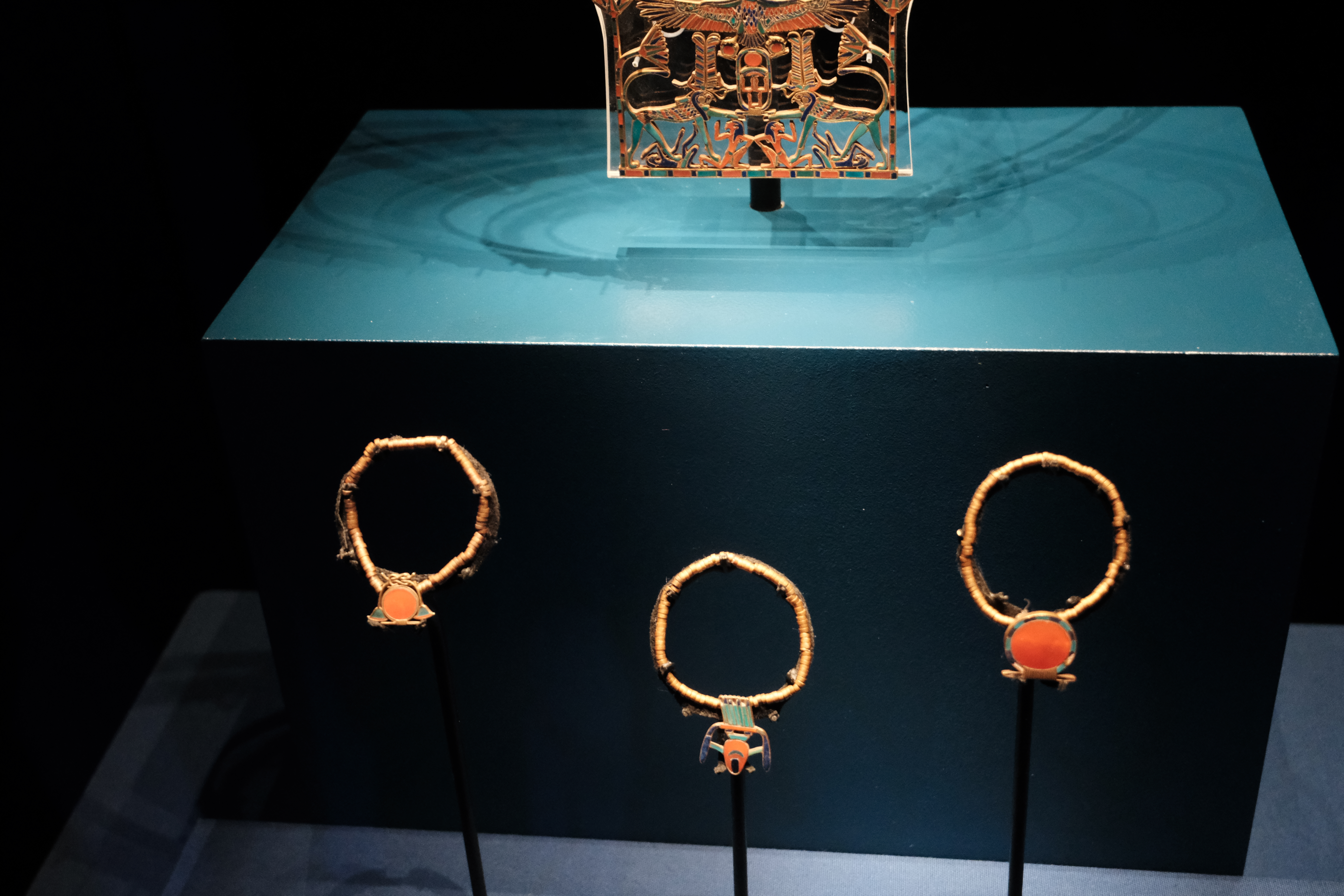
Three separate pectorals of Mereret (bottom)

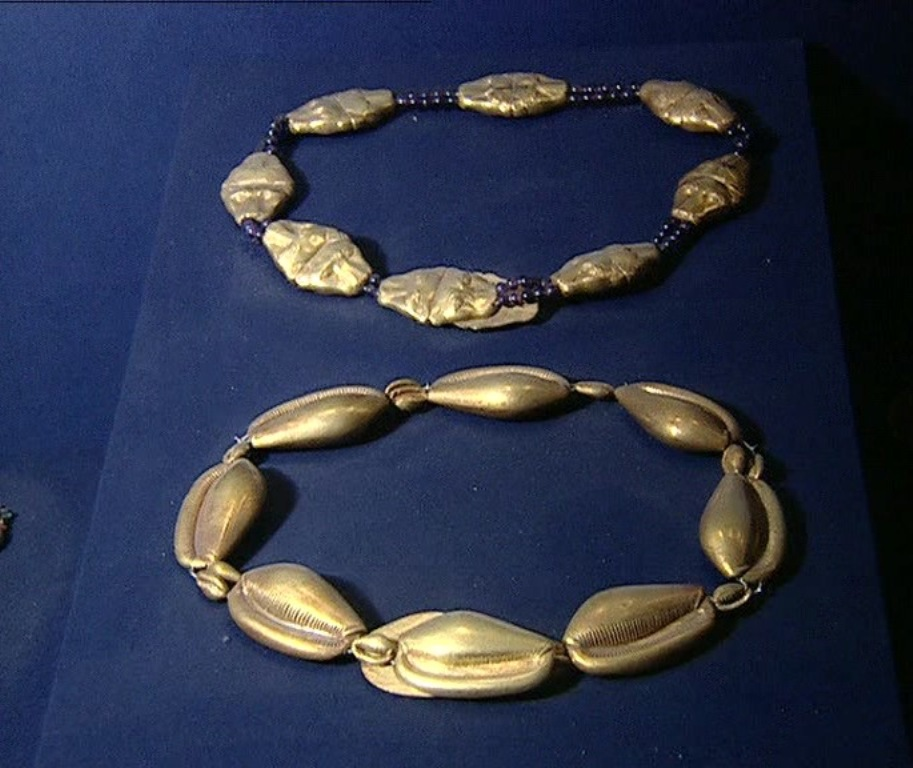
Gold and Amethyst Girdle (top) and Belt (bottom) from Mereret's tomb.

== Literature ==
- Dieter Arnold: The Pyramid Complex of Senwosret III at Dahshur, Architectural Studies, New York, Metropolitan Museum of Art, ISBN 0-87099-956-7
