= Nebit =

Egyptian official

- Vizier of Egypt
- Dynasty: 12th dynasty
- Pharaoh: Senusret III
- Burial: Mastaba at Dahshur
- Spouse: Satwerut?

Nebit was an ancient Egyptian official during the reign of king Senusret III. He held the position of vizier. Thus, he was the most important official at the royal court. Nebit is only known from his large mastaba, which was excavated next to the pyramid of the king at Dahshur. The mastaba was built of mud bricks and then covered with stones. Already in ancient times the high quality stone was looted and used for other building projects or just for burning lime. However, one wall of the mastaba facade had already collapsed and had been covered by sand before looters dismantled the rest of the building. The preserved facade bears the name and title of Nebit, but also the name of the king. Within the remains of the mastaba were found by Jacques de Morgan the bust of a statue made of granodiorite. The fragment is not inscribed but most likely depicts Nebit.

The underground burial chamber of Nebit had already been robbed when it was discovered. However, next to the burial chamber of Nebit, there was a chamber for a woman called Satwerut, perhaps the wife of Nebit. Her chamber was found intact and still contained the coffins of the lady, her Canopic jars and jewellery.

== Literature ==
- Dieter Arnold: Egyptian Archaeology 9 (1996), pp. 23–25
- Dieter Arnold: Antike Welt 6 (2002), pp. 623–624
- Wolfram Grajetzki: Court Officials of the Egyptian Middle Kingdom, Bristol Classical Press, London 2009 pp. 33-34 ISBN 978-0-7156-3745-6
