= List of Egyptian pyramidia =

List of capstones of ancient Egyptian pyramids

Pyramidia (singular: pyramidion) are the capstones of ancient Egyptian pyramids.

Tips of obelisks, also called pyramidia, were not separate stones and are not included in this list.

Image	Dyn	Associated name(s)	Findspot	Current location	Material(s)	Deco	Base	Hgt	Ref
Image	Dyn	Associated name(s)	Findspot	Current location	Material(s)	Deco	in cm		Ref
Old Kingdom (c. 2543 – 2120 BC)
	4	Sneferu	Dashur, Red Pyramid	Dashur	Limestone	No	157 ?	100 ?	
	4	Khufu	Giza, Pyramid G1-d	Giza	Limestone	No	111.8	70.9	
	4	Wife of Menkaure	Giza, Pyramid G3-a		Limestone	No	112.5	75	
	5	Sahure	Abusir, Pyramid of Sahure	Known only from inscription	Limestone, gold				
	5	Khentkaus II	Abusir, Pyramid of Khentkaus II		Black granite				
	6	Merenre Nemtyemsaf I	Saqqara, Pyramid of Merenre	Known only from inscription	Black granite				
	6	Udjebten	Saqqara, Pyramid of Udjebten	Known only from inscription	Stone, gold				
Middle Kingdom (c. 1980 – 1760 BC)
	12	Queen (?) of Senusret I	Lisht, Pyramid 3 of Senusret's complex		Red granite				
	12	Queen (?) of Senusret I	Lisht, Pyramid 5 of Senusret's complex		Red granite				
	12	Senusret II	El Lahun, Pyramid of Senusret II	London, Petrie Museum	Black granite	Yes			
	12	Amenemhat III	Dahshur, Black Pyramid (Pyramidion of Amenemhat III)	Cairo, Egyptian Museum	Black granite	Yes	185	140	
	12	Amenemhat III	Hawara	London, Petrie Museum	Limestone	No	23		
	13	Khendjer	South Saqqara, Pyramid of Khendjer	Cairo, Egyptian Museum	Black granite	Yes	140	130	
	13	Merneferre Ay	South Saqqara, Pyramid of Merneferre Ay	Cairo, Egyptian Museum	Black granite	Yes	83	85	
	13		Southern South Saqqara pyramid	Cairo, Egyptian Museum	Black granite	No	156	145 (slp)	
Second Intermediate Period (c. 1759 – 1539 BC)
	17	Intef V	Dra' Abu el-Naga', Pyramid of Intef V	London, British Museum	Limestone	Yes	34	22	
	17	Intef VI	Dra' Abu el-Naga', Pyramid of Intef VI		Limestone	Yes			
	17/18	Ahmose	Dra' Abu el-Naga'		Limestone	Yes			
Image	Dyn	Associated name(s)	Findspot	Current location	Material(s)	Deco	Base	Hgt	Ref
Image	Dyn	Associated name(s)	Findspot	Current location	Material(s)	Deco	in cm		Ref
New Kingdom (c. 1539 – 1077 BC)
	18 or earlier	Teti, lector-priest of Senisonb	Theban area ?	Oxford, Ashmolean Museum	Limestone	Yes	31	40.5 (slp)	
	18	Tetisheri	Abydos, Pyramid of Tetisheri		Limestone	Yes			
	18	Iniuia	Saqqara	Paris, Louvre	Red granite	Yes	70 67.5	63	
	18	Ptahmose, High-Priest of Thutmose III	Saqqara ?	Berlin, Egyptian Museum	Gabbro	Yes	43 41	39.5	
	18	Ahmose ?	Theban area ?	San Jose, Rosicrucian Egyptian Museum	Limestone	Yes	23.2	36.3	
	18	Meriré	Amarna	Berlin, Egyptian Museum	Limestone	Yes	30 28	24	
	18 ?	anonymous	Abydos	Brussels, Royal Museums of Art and History	Limestone	Yes	25.7 23.5	35.7	
	18	Houy	Saqqara	Florence, National Archaeological Museum	Gray granite	Yes	32	36	
	18	Nedjem		Cairo, Egyptian Museum	Sandstone	Yes	33	43.5	
	18	Amenhotep (Huy)	Saqqara	Leiden, Rijksmuseum van Oudheden	Red granite	Yes	77	67	
	18	Amenemone	Memphis	Cairo, Egyptian Museum	Limestone	Yes	43.5	37	
	18	anonymous		London, British Museum	Limestone	Yes	50	48	
	18	Ptahemwia	Saqqara	Leiden, Rijksmuseum van Oudheden	Limestone	Yes	28	42	
	18	Nebanon	Thebes	Munich, Staatliches Museum Ägyptischer Kunst	Limestone	Yes	46		
	18	Imenemheb	Qurnet Murai	Paris, Louvre	Sandstone	Yes	44.5	85.7	
	18	Pay	Memphis	Paris, Louvre	Limestone	Yes	45 44.5	40	
	18	Kha	Deir el-Medina, Pyramid chapel of TT8	Paris, Louvre	Sandstone	Yes	49	83	
	18	Hori	Abu Tig	Seattle Art Museum	Limestone	Yes	28.5	31.6	
	18	Nakhtmin ?	Deir el-Medina		Limestone	No	65	65	
	18 or later		Amarna, South Tombs Cemetery		Limestone		24 20	35	
	18/19	Raia	Saqqara	Vienna, Kunsthistorisches Museum	Limestone	Yes	37.4 31.3	33.3	
	18/19	Mahu, the Quarter Master		Edinburgh, National Museum of Scotland	Limestone, plaster, paint	Yes	18	36.5	
	18/19	Ry (Roy), head of bowmen	Abydos	Cairo, Egyptian Museum	Limestone	Yes	48.5	49	
	18/19	anonymous		Cairo, Egyptian Museum	Limestone	Yes	34.5	61.5	
	18/19	Neferhotep	Deir el-Medina		Limestone	Yes	40	34	
	18/19	Huy, Servant in the Place of Truth	Deir el-Medina		Sandstone	Yes	35.6	35.6	
	18/19	Nornakht	Aniba		Sandstone	Yes	30.7 27.8	28	
	After 18 ?	Khonsou / Hori	Gurob	Cairo, Egyptian Museum	Limestone	Yes	31	40	
	19	Khay (vizier)	Pyramid of Khay	Sheikh Abd el-Qurna	Granodiorite				
	19	Tia (princess) and Tia (overseer of treasury)	Saqqara, Pyramid of the two Tias	Lost c. 1792 AD	Red granite	Yes	91	76	
	19	Scribe Mose (Ms)	West-Thebes ?	Hildesheim, Roemer- und Pelizaeus-Museum	Limestone	Yes		52	
	19	Minemheb	Thebes	Cambridge, Fitzwilliam Museum	Limestone	Yes	34	47.5	
	19	Senres ?		Paris, Louvre	Limestone	Yes	51 36.5	43.5	
	19	Nehi	Qurnet Murai	Florence, National Archaeological Museum	Sandstone	Yes	61	57	
	19	Ptahemouia	Memphis	Cairo, Egyptian Museum	Limestone	Yes	55 44	38	
	19	Nebmeroutef Ry	Beit Khallaf	Cairo, Egyptian Museum	Limestone	Yes	24	20	
	19	Messouy	Temple of Amada	Cairo, Egyptian Museum	Limestone	Yes	42	67	
	19	anonymous	Kurna	Cairo, Egyptian Museum	Faience	Yes	37	26	
	19	Anu (Aâouy)	Aniba	Cairo, Egyptian Museum	Sandstone	Yes	46.5	56	
	19	Amenhotep-Huy	Memphis	Cairo, Egyptian Museum	Grey granite	Yes	52	50	
	19	Kenro	El-Khokha, TT178	Cairo, Egyptian Museum	Faience	Yes	39	28	
	19	Tourobay	Deir el-Medina	St. Petersburg, Hermitage Museum	Limestone	Yes	17	26	
	19	Neferronpet	Saqqara	Liverpool, National Museums	Granite	Yes	33 29	46	
	19	Hornefer	Deir el-Medina	London, British Museum	Sandstone	Yes	33.5	40	
	19	Intj	Abydos	London, British Museum	Limestone	Yes	40	40	
	19	Nebamun (Nebamontet)	Deir el-Medina	London, Petrie Museum	Limestone	Yes	15	18.5	
	19	anonymous	Gurob	London, Petrie Museum	Limestone	Yes		24	
	19	anonymous	Gurob	London, Petrie Museum	Limestone	Yes		27.5	
	19	Pyay	Deir el-Medina	Paris, Louvre	Limestone	Yes	35	37	
	19	Ramose	Deir el-Medina	Turin, Museo Egizio	Limestone	Yes	57.5	70	
	19	Khonsou	Deir el-Medina, chapel of tomb 1	Turin, Museo Egizio	Limestone	Yes	43	59	
	19	Nebnefer / Neferhotep	Deir el-Medina		Limestone	Yes	36	50	
	19	Sennedjem	Deir el-Medina		Limestone	Yes	61.5	61.5	
	19 ?	Neferrenpet ?	Deir el-Medina		Limestone	Yes			
	19	Penmerenab ?	Deir el-Medina, chapel 322			Yes			
	19	Amenemope	Deir el-Medina, tomb 215 ?		Limestone	Yes			
	19	Ptahmose	Saqqara	London, British Museum		Yes			
	19	Ramses II ?	Wadi es-Sebua			Yes	45	75	
	19	Thothermektef ?	Deir el-Medina, TT357			Yes	36	30	
	19	[Messouy]	Temple of Amada		Sandstone	Yes	48	75	
	19	Pennout ?	Aniba		Sandstone	No	45 40	65	
	19/20	Meri-imen Ra-mesu	Western Thebes	Vienna, Kunsthistorisches Museum	Sandstone, paint	Yes	36.4 30.1	44.6	
	19/20	Hori	Deir el-Medina	Paris, Louvre	Sandstone	Yes	38 37	41	
	19/20 ?		Abydos	Pennsylvania, Penn Museum	Limestone	Yes			
	19/20	Tjeper	Abydos	Edinburgh, National Museum of Scotland	Black basalt	Yes	25	25	
	19/20	Amenhotp	Abydos	Cairo, Egyptian Museum	Sandstone	Yes	42	45.5	
	19/20	Amenemheb / Neferrenpet	Deir el-Medina	London, British Museum	Limestone	Yes	27 24	36	
	19/20	Khat	Deir el-Medina	London, British Museum	Limestone	Yes	49	65	
	19/20	Taya	Saqqara	Paris, Louvre	Limestone	Yes	41 36.3	35	
	19/20	Khonsouhetep		Paris, Louvre	Limestone	Yes	36	40.2	
	19/20	Pagerger	Memphis	Paris, Louvre	Limestone	Yes	25	24.5	
	19/20	Aamakt	Deir el-Medina, TT356	Paris, Louvre	Limestone	Yes	37	39.2	
	19/20	Ipy	Deir el-Medina	Paris, Louvre	Limestone	Yes	23	33	
	19/20	Tourbay	Deir el-Medina	Paris, Louvre	Limestone	Yes	24.5 23	34	
	19/20	Amenemope	Thebes	Vatican Museums	Limestone	Yes	30	34	
	19/20		Deir el-Medina, tomb 219		Limestone	Yes			
	19/20	Amenemouia ?	Deir el-Medina		Sandstone	Yes			
	19/20	Amennakht Dydy ?	Deir el-Medina		Limestone	Yes			
	19/20	Houy ?	Deir el-Medina, tomb 1336		Limestone	Yes			
	19/20 ?		Deir el-Medina		Limestone	Yes			
	19/20		Deir el-Medina		Limestone	Yes	35–45	60–70	
	19/20	Amennakht	Deir el-Medina, 1349 or 1343		Limestone	Yes			
	20	God's Adorer ʒst	Qift	London, British Museum	Limestone, plaster	Yes	43	38.2	
	20	Iry	Deir el-Medina		Limestone	Yes	23 21	32	
	20	Kaha	Deir el-Medina		Limestone	Yes			
	NK	Nebseny	Memphis	Paris, Louvre	Limestone	Yes	40	53	
	NK			Paris, Louvre	Faience	Yes	15.5	13.2	
	NK	Penmehet	Beit Khallaf	Berlin, Egyptian Museum	Limestone	Yes	32.5	65	
	NK ?	Bekenamun		English private collection	Limestone	Yes	35.2	38.1	
	NK ?	Harsiesi	Abydos	Cairo, Egyptian Museum	Limestone	Yes		23	
	NK ?	Ptahmose/ Paherpedjet	Abydos ?	Copenhague	Limestone	Yes	35	37	
	NK	Amenhotep		Florence, National Archaeological Museum	Limestone	Yes	23 21	32	
	NK	anonymous		Florence, National Archaeological Museum	Limestone	Yes	14 12.5	38	
	NK	anonymous		Heidelberg, Sammlung des Ägyptologischen Instituts	Sandstone	Yes	46	69	
	NK	Mose (?)	Memphis	Cairo, Egyptian Museum	Limestone	Yes	48 41	60.5	
	NK	anonymous		Cairo, Egyptian Museum	Limestone	Yes	27 25	40.5	
	NK	Amenemopet	Abydos	Cairo, Egyptian Museum	Limestone	Yes	32.5	53	
	NK	Pauty	Saqqara	Leiden, Rijksmuseum van Oudheden	Limestone	Yes	47	47	
	NK	Tjanefer	Deir el-Medina, temple of Mentouhotep	London, British Museum	Black basalt	Yes	22 20	24	
	NK	Buqentef	Deir el-Medina	London, British Museum	Limestone	Yes	28 19.5	66	
	NK ?	Djehuty (Thuti)	Deir el-Medina, temple of Mentouhotep	London, British Museum	Limestone	Yes	11.4	18	
	NK	anonymous	Deir el-Medina	Turin, Museo Egizio	Limestone	Yes	15	20	
	NK	anonymous	Gurnah	Voronezh	Sandstone	Yes			
	NK	Pached ?	Deir el-Medina		Limestone	Yes			
	NK		Deir el-Medina		Limestone	Yes			
	NK		Deir el-Medina		Limestone	Yes			
	NK		Deir el-Medina		Limestone				
	NK		Deir el-Medina		Limestone				
	NK		Aniba		Sandstone	Yes		40	
	NK	Roro	Deir el-Medina	Leipzig University	Limestone	Yes	26	54	
	NK	Penbouy ?	Deir el-Medina			Yes			
	NK	Tiro ?	Deir el-Medina			Yes			
	NK								
	NK	Panufer	Thebes	Cairo, Egyptian Museum	Granite				
	NK		Abydos	Cairo, Egyptian Museum		Yes			
Image	Dyn	Associated name(s)	Findspot	Current location	Material(s)	Deco	Base	Hgt	Ref
Image	Dyn	Associated name(s)	Findspot	Current location	Material(s)	Deco	in cm		Ref
Third Intermediate Period of Egypt (c. 1077 – 722 BC)
	~21	Nestaouat	Memphis	Cairo, Egyptian Museum	Limestone	Yes	31.5 30	29.5	
	21	Bennebensekhaf	Thebes	Paris, Louvre	Limestone	Yes	48	47.6	
	TIP/LP	anonymous		Liverpool, National Museums	Wood, gesso, paint	Yes	14 12	25	
Late Period (c. 722 – 332 BC)
	26	Iufaa	Abydos	NYC, Metropolitan Museum of Art	Limestone, paint	Yes	27.2 26.4	35.5	
	26	Nesnubhotep	Abydos	London, Petrie Museum	Limestone	Yes		35	
	26	Wedjahor	Abydos	London, British Museum	Limestone	Yes	48.5	58	
	26	Pedesi (Petisis)	Abydos	Cairo, Egyptian Museum	Limestone	Yes			
	26	Khepri	Abydos	Trieste, Museo Civico di Storia Naturale	Limestone	Yes	23.5	37	
	26	Nesipakashuty, Vizier	Abydos	Glasgow, Burrell Collection	Limestone	Yes	25.6 21.9	38.5	
	26	Hr-zi-ist				Yes			
	26 ?	Esnubhotp	Abydos	Cairo, Egyptian Museum	Stone	Yes		40	
	26 ?	Djedhor	Abydos	Paris, Louvre	Limestone	Yes	39.4 38.3	35.5	
	30?		Abydos	Avignon, Calvet Museum					
	30 or later	Rer and Nitokris	Abydos	St. Petersburg, Hermitage Museum	Limestone, paint	Yes	36.5	44	
	Late	Horemakhbit	Abydos	Paris, Louvre	Limestone	Yes	36	34	
	Late	Padipahernefer	Abydos ?	Paris, Louvre	Limestone	Yes	29	33	
	Late			Edinburgh, National Museum of Scotland	Limestone				
	Late	Nespemede	Abydos	Destroyed in WWII ?		Yes		26	
	Late	Pakhnum	Abybos	Durham University	Limestone	Yes	25.2 25	35.7	
	Late	Harhotep, Head Dancer of Bastet							
Unknown date
			Abydos	Abydos ?	Gray granite	No	47 35	45	
			Abydos		Gray granite	No	62 41	49	
Image	Dyn	Associated name(s)	Findspot	Current location	Material(s)	Deco	Base	Hgt	Ref
Image	Dyn	Associated name(s)	Findspot	Current location	Material(s)	Deco	in cm		Ref

== See also ==
- Benben

== Bibliography ==
- Arnold, Dieter (1992). The Pyramid Complex of Senwosret I.
- De Meulenaere, H. (1968). "Pyramidions d´Abydos". Jaarbericht Ex Oriente Lux (in French). 20: 1–20.
- Erman (1899). Ausführliches Verzeichnis der aegyptischen Altertümer und Gipsabgüsse (in German). Berlin, W. Spemann.
- Jánosi, Peter (1992). "Das Pyramidion der Pyramide G III-a. Bemerkungen zu den Pyramidenspitzen des Alten Reiches". Studia Aegyptiaca (in German). 14: 301–308.
- Jéquier, Gustave (1933). Deux pyramides du moyen empire (in French).
- Lehner, Mark (1997). The Complete Pyramids. London: Thames and Hudson. ISBN 0-500-05084-8.
- Malek, Jaromir (1990). "New-Kingdom Pyramidia". The Journal of Egyptian Archaeology. 76: 180–184. doi:10.2307/3822024. JSTOR 3822024.
- Malek, Jaromir (2011). "Cairo, Egyptian Museum" (PDF).
- Mariette, Auguste (1880). "Pyramides". Catalogue général des monuments d'Abydos découverts pendant les fouilles de cette ville (in French). pp. 558–562.
- Myśliwiec, Karol (1978). "Zwei pyramidia der XIX. Dynastie aus Memphis". Studien zur Altägyptischen Kultur (in German). 6: 139–155. JSTOR 25150031.
- Polz, Daniel (2010). "New Archaeological Data From Dra Abu El-Naga and Their Historical Implications" (PDF). The Second Intermediate Period. pp. 343–353.
- Rammant-Peeters, Agnès (1983). Les pyramidions égyptiens du Nouvel Empire (in French). Peeters Publishers. ISBN 9789070192082.
- Schiaparelli, Ernesto (1887). Antichità egizie (in Italian). pp. 420–424.
- Steindorff, Georg (1937). Aniba (in German). Vol. 2. Augustin.
