= Pyramidion =

Capstone of an ancient Egyptian pyramid or obelisk

Benbenet in hieroglyphs
b n b n t O24
bnbnt
Benben + suffix -t used to form feminine nouns
- Greek: Πυραμιδιον

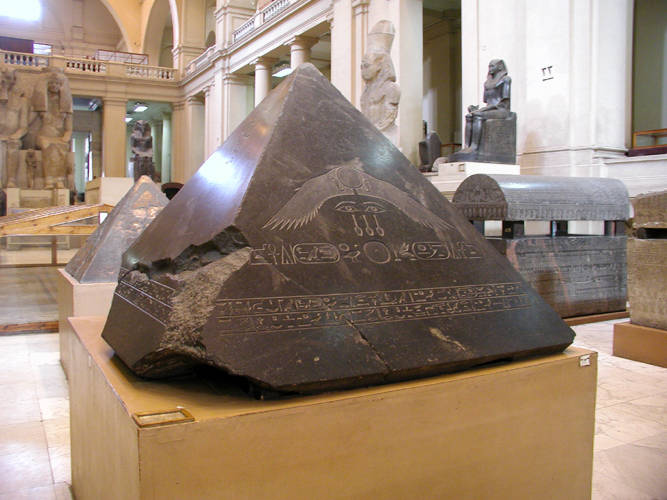
Close-up of the Pyramidion of Amenemhat III at Dahshur. Egyptian Museum, Cairo

A pyramidion (plural: pyramidia) is the capstone of an Egyptian pyramid or the upper section of an obelisk. Speakers of the Ancient Egyptian language referred to pyramidia as benbenet and associated the pyramid as a whole with the sacred benben stone.

Pyramidia were usually made of limestone, sandstone, basalt or granite, and were sometimes covered with plates of copper, gold or electrum. From the Middle Kingdom onward, they were often "inscribed with royal titles and religious symbols".

== Notable pyramidia ==
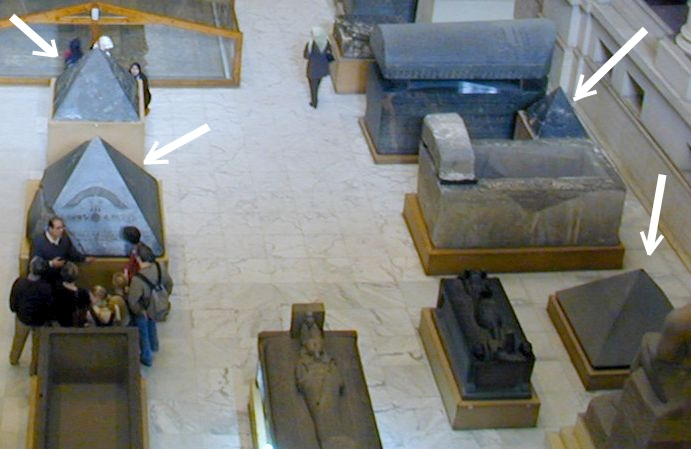
The four pyramidia at the Egyptian Museum, Cairo

=== Egyptian Museum ===
Four pyramidia are housed in the main hall of the Egyptian Museum in Cairo:

- The pyramidion of the so-called Black Pyramid of Amenemhat III at Dahshur
- The pyramidion of the Pyramid of Khendjer at Saqqara
- The pyramidion of Merneferre Ay, probably from Saqqara
- The pyramidion of the Southern South Saqqara pyramid

=== Red Pyramid ===
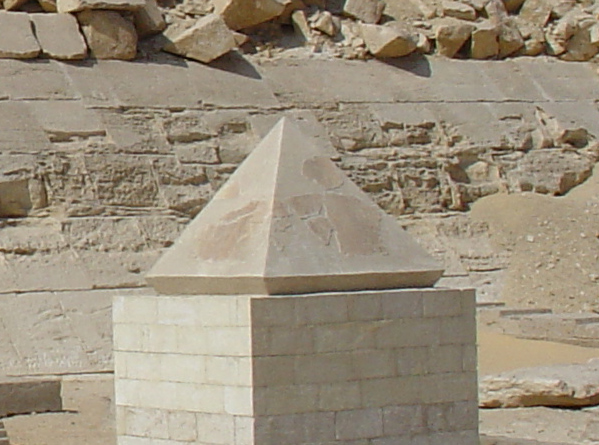
The restored pyramidion of the Red Pyramid at Dashur, on display beside the pyramid

A badly damaged white Tura limestone pyramidion, thought to have been made for the Red Pyramid of Sneferu at Dahshur, has been reconstructed and is on open-air display beside that pyramid; it presents a minor mystery, however, as its angle of inclination is steeper than that of the edifice it was apparently built to surmount.

=== Washington Monument ===
Erected in 1876 in Washington D.C., the Washington Monument holds an inscribed pyramidion of aluminum.

== Private brick pyramids with pyramidia ==
During the New Kingdom, some private underground tombs were marked on the surface by small brick pyramids that terminated in pyramidia. The four lateral sides included texts and scenes related to the cult of the Sun God (as the representation of Pharaoh).

The scenes typically depict the course of the sun, rising on one lateral face, setting on the opposite face, and traveling, through the night, through the underworld, ruled by Osiris.

=== Scribe Mose pyramidion ===
Y4 F31 S29
Scribe Moses//Mes, S
in hieroglyphs
Era: New Kingdom
(1550–1069 BC)

The pyramidion of Mose (mes, New Kingdom, 19th Dynasty, c. 1250 BC, limestone, 53 cm tall) depicts himself making an offering, with his name on two opposite faces. The adjacent opposite faces feature a baboon: "Screeching upon the rising of the Sun, and the Day". (The baboon is also the god-scribe representation of the Scribe, for the god Thoth.)

=== Ptahemwia pyramidion ===
The pyramidion of Ptahemwia (19th Dynasty, Ramesside Period, c. 1200 BC, limestone, 28 cm wide, 42 cm tall) likewise displays sun-related scenes. The Sun God, Re-Horakhti, and the god of the Underworld, Osiris, are shown on one lateral face.

Facing the two gods, on the adjacent lateral face, is the deceased Ptahemwia, standing in an offering pose, facing three columns of hieroglyphs.

=== Gallery ===
Pyramidion of king Merneferre Ay, granite, 13th Dynasty, Egyptian Museum

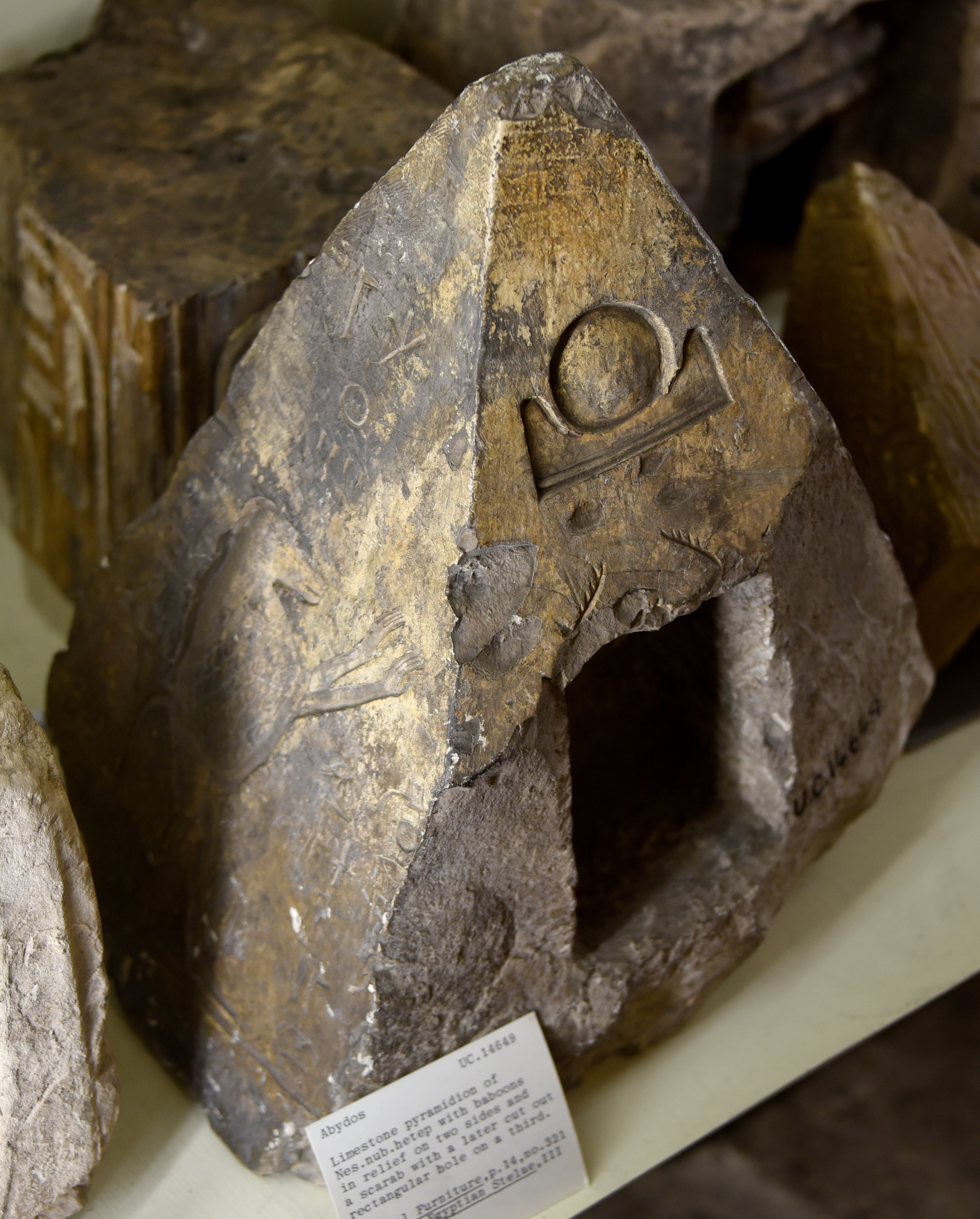
Pyramidion of the chapel of Nesnubhotep, limestone with relief of a scarab and adoring baboons, 26th Dynasty, Abydos

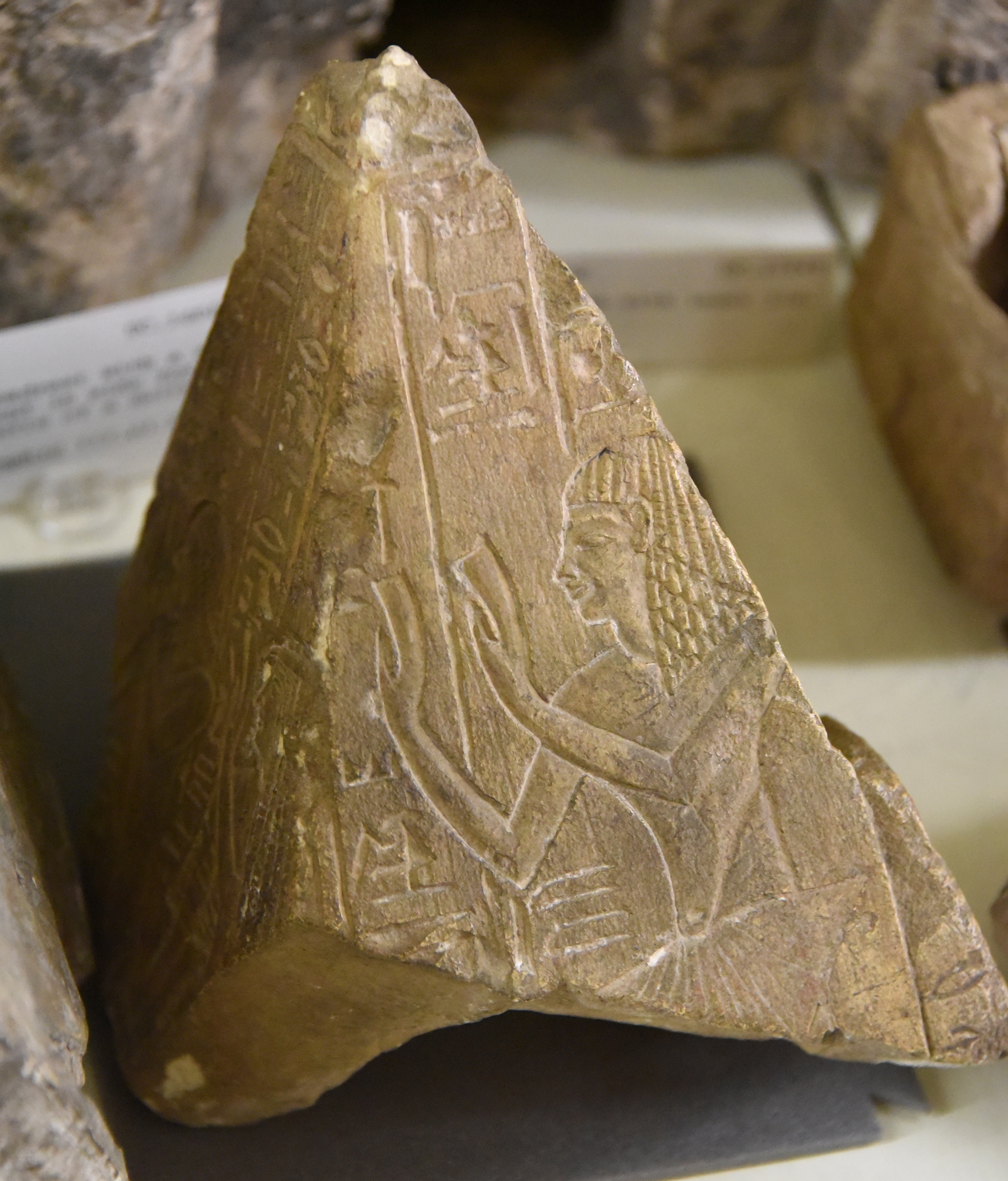
Pyramidion of Nebamun, limestone, 19th Dynasty, probably from Deir el-Medina

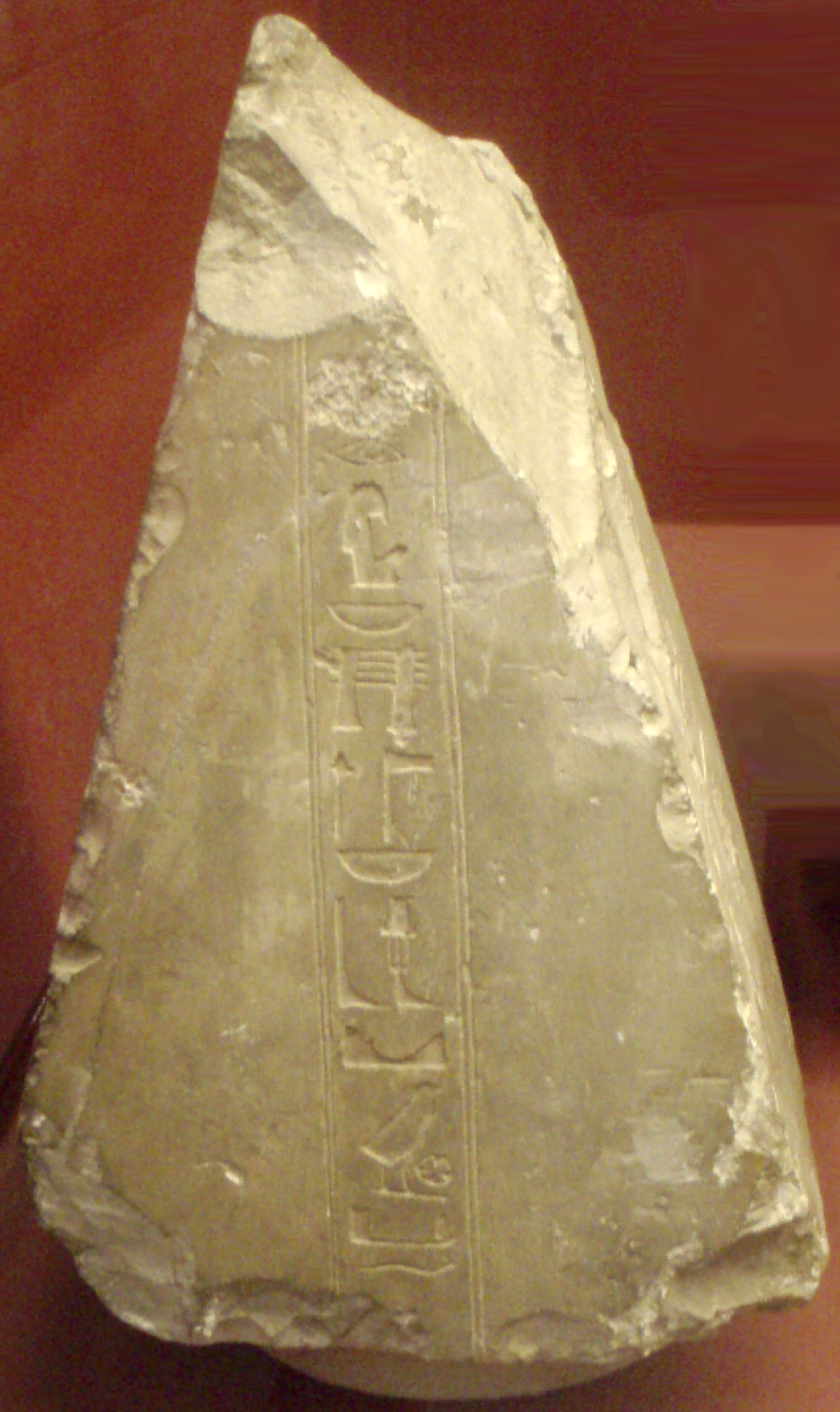
Private tomb limestone pyramidion, at the Rosicrucian Egyptian Museum

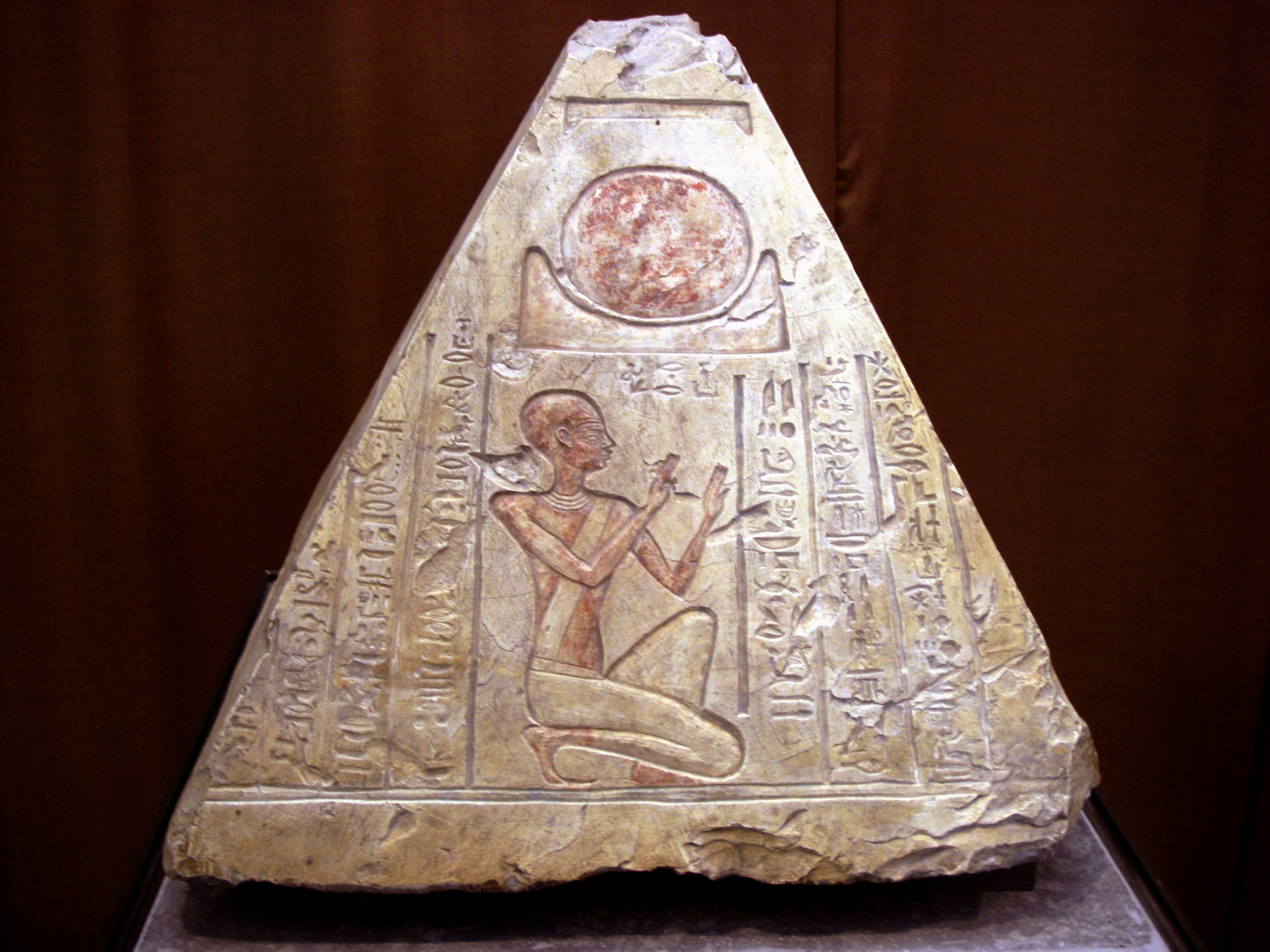
Pyramidion from the tomb of the priest Rer in Abydos, Egypt. Hermitage Museum

Pyramidion of Ramose, from Deir el-Medina, 1292–1190 BC (New Kingdom), limestone, Museo Egizio, Turin

== See also ==
- Washington Monument, which has an aluminum pyramidion
