= Benben =

Pyramid capstone

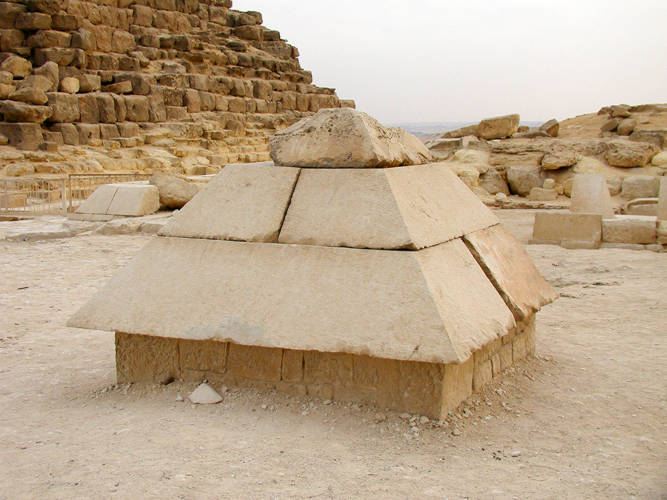
- Reconstructed apex of one of the pyramids (G1-d) of the Giza Plateau, symbolizing Benben.
- Type: Mound

In the creation myth of the Heliopolitan form of ancient Egyptian religion, Benben was the mound that arose from the primordial waters (Nu), and upon which the creator deity Atum settled. The Benben stone is associated with the top stone of a pyramid, which is called a pyramid's pyramidion (or benbenet). It is also related to the obelisk.

== Primeval mound ==
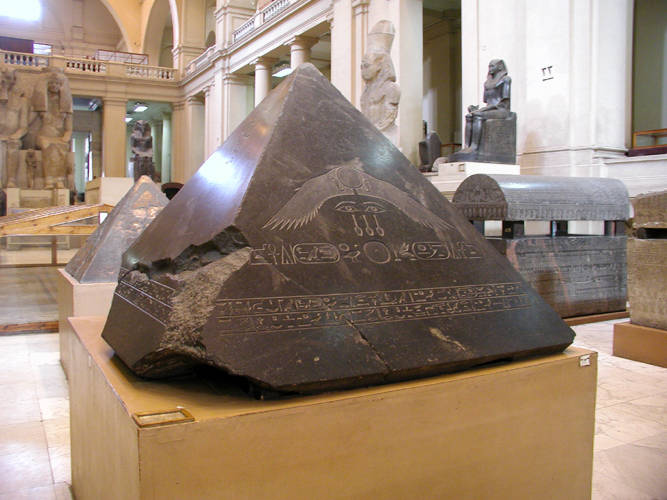
Pyramidion of Amenemhat III from the Black Pyramid, Twelfth Dynasty. Egyptian Museum, Cairo.

In the Pyramid Texts, e.g. Utterances 587 and 600, Atum himself is at times referred to as "mound". It was said to have turned into a small pyramid, located in Heliopolis (Egyptian: Annu or Iunu), within which Atum was said to dwell. Other cities developed their own myths of the primeval mound. At Memphis, the god Tatenen, an earth god and the origin of "all things in the shape of food and viands, divine offers, all good things", was the personification of the primeval mound.

== Benben stone ==
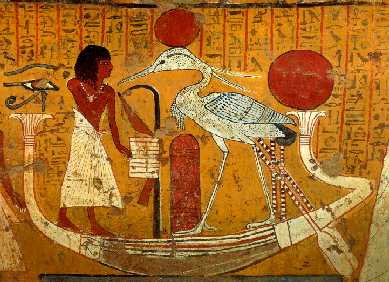
Bennu bird from an Egyptian papyrus.

The Benben stone, named after the mound, was a sacred stone in the temple of Ra at Heliopolis (Egyptian: Annu or Iunu). It was the location on which the first rays of the sun fell. It is thought to have been the prototype for later obelisks, and the capstones of the great pyramids were based on its design. The capstone (the tip of the pyramid) is also called a pyramidion. In ancient Egypt, these were probably polished or clad so they shone in sunlight.

Many Benben stones, often carved with images and inscriptions, are found in museums around the world.

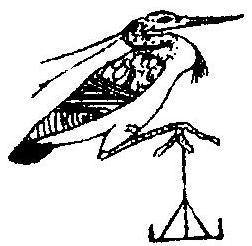
Bennu standing on a simple Benben depiction, from The Book of the Dead (1895 print)

The bird deity Bennu, which was probably the inspiration for the phoenix, was venerated at Heliopolis, where it was said to be living on the Benben stone or on the holy willow tree.

According to Barry Kemp, the connection between the benben, the phoenix, and the sun may well have been based on alliteration: the rising, weben, of the sun sending its rays towards the benben, on which the bennu bird lives. Utterance 600, § 1652 of the Pyramid Texts speaks of Atum as you rose up, as the benben, in the Mansion of the Bennu in Heliopolis.

=== Historical development ===
From the earliest times, the portrayal of Benben was stylized in two ways; the first was as a pointed, pyramidal form, which was probably the model for pyramids and obelisks. The other form was round-topped; this was probably the origin of Benben as a free standing votive object and an object of veneration.

During the Fifth Dynasty, the portrayal of benben was formalized as a squat obelisk. Later, during the Middle Kingdom, this became a long, thin obelisk.

In the Amarna Period tomb of Panehesy, the benben is seen as a large, round-topped stela standing on a raised platform.

== See also ==
- Ancient Egyptian creation myths
- Baetyl
- Egyptian sun temple
- Abzu
- Lingam
- List of Egyptian pyramidia

== Bibliography ==
- Manfred Lurker Lexikon der Götter und Symbole der alten Ägypter, Scherz 1998
- Barry John Kemp Ancient Egypt: Anatomy of a Civilization, Routledge 1991, p. 88
- Katheryn A. Bard Encyclopedia of the Archaeology of Ancient Egypt, Routledge 1999, p. 205
- George Hart Egyptian Myths, University of Texas Press 1990, pp. 11, 12, 16
