= Winged sun =

Symbol of divinity, royalty and power

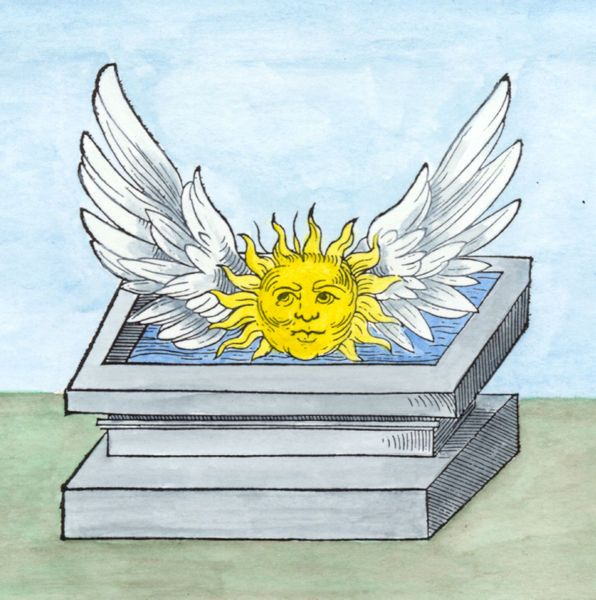
A winged sun hovers over a sepulchre filled with water; an alchemical symbol from the Rosary of the Philosophers

The winged sun is a solar symbol associated with divinity, royalty, and power in the Ancient Near East (Egypt, Mesopotamia, Anatolia, and Persia). The Illyrian Sun-deity is also represented as a winged sun.

== Ancient Egypt ==
"Winged Sun of Thebes"

In ancient Egypt, the symbol is attested from the Old Kingdom (Sneferu, 26th century BC), often flanked on either side with a uraeus.

=== Behdety ===
In early Egyptian religion, the symbol Behdety represented Horus of Edfu, later identified with Ra-Horakhty. It is sometimes depicted on the neck of Apis, the bull of Ptah. As time passed (according to interpretation) all of the subordinated gods of Egypt were considered to be aspects of the sun god, including Khepri. The name "Behdety" means the inhabitant of Behdet.

He was the sky god of the region called Behdet in the Nile basin.

His image was first found in the inscription on a comb's body, as a winged solar panel. The period of the comb is about 3000 BC. Such winged solar panels were later found in the funeral picture of Pharaoh Sahure of the fifth dynasty. Behdety is seen as the protector of Pharaoh. On both sides of his picture are seen the Uraeus, which is a symbol for the cobra-headed goddess Wadjet.

He resisted the intense heat of Egyptian sun with his two wings.

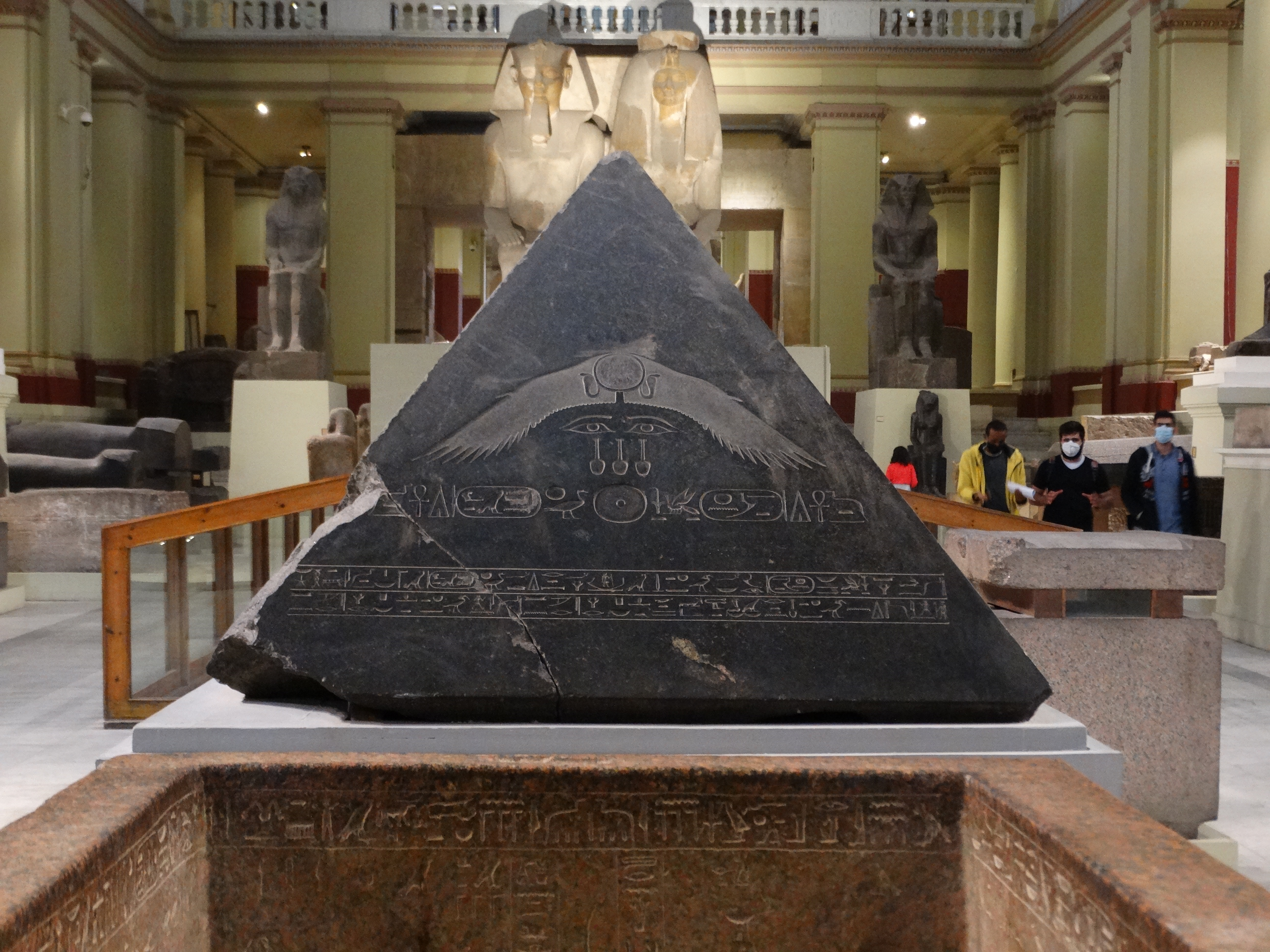
Pyramidion of Amenemhat III from the Black Pyramid, Twelfth Dynasty. Egyptian Museum, Cairo

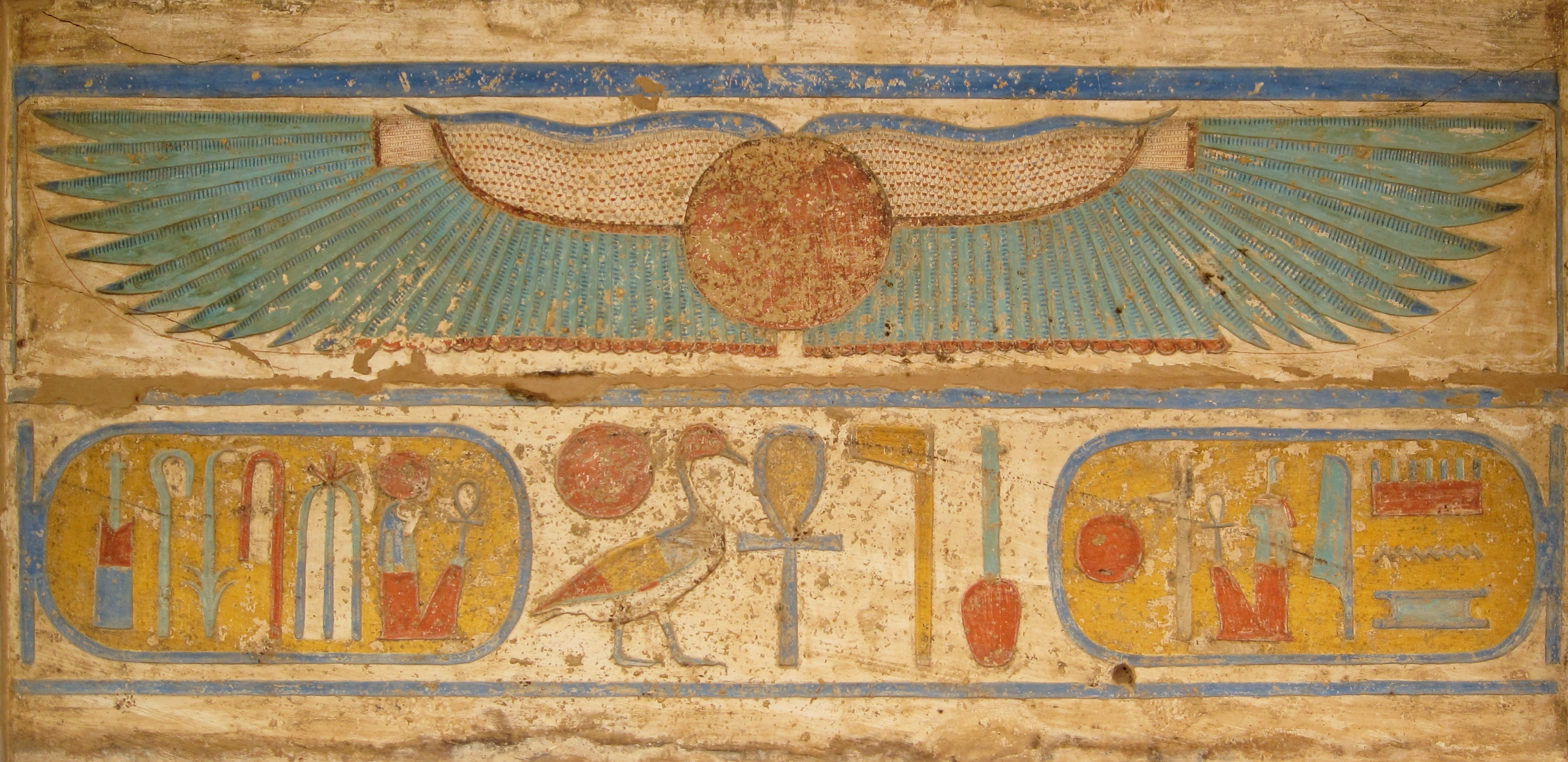
The winged sun on the ceiling to the entrance to the temple of Ramses III

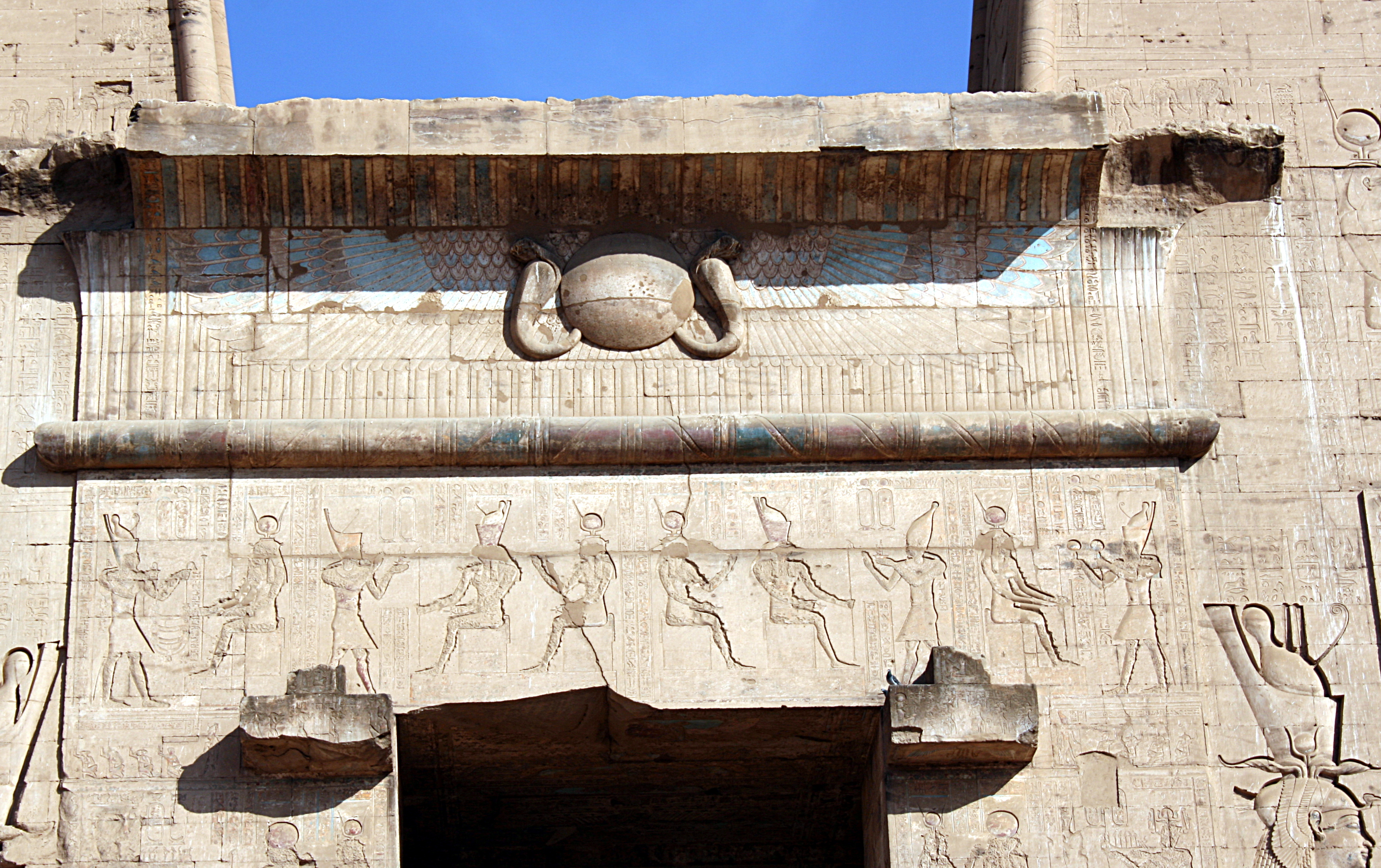
Heru-Behdeti ("Horus of Behedet") as a winged sun disk on the cornice of a pylon at the temple of Edfu

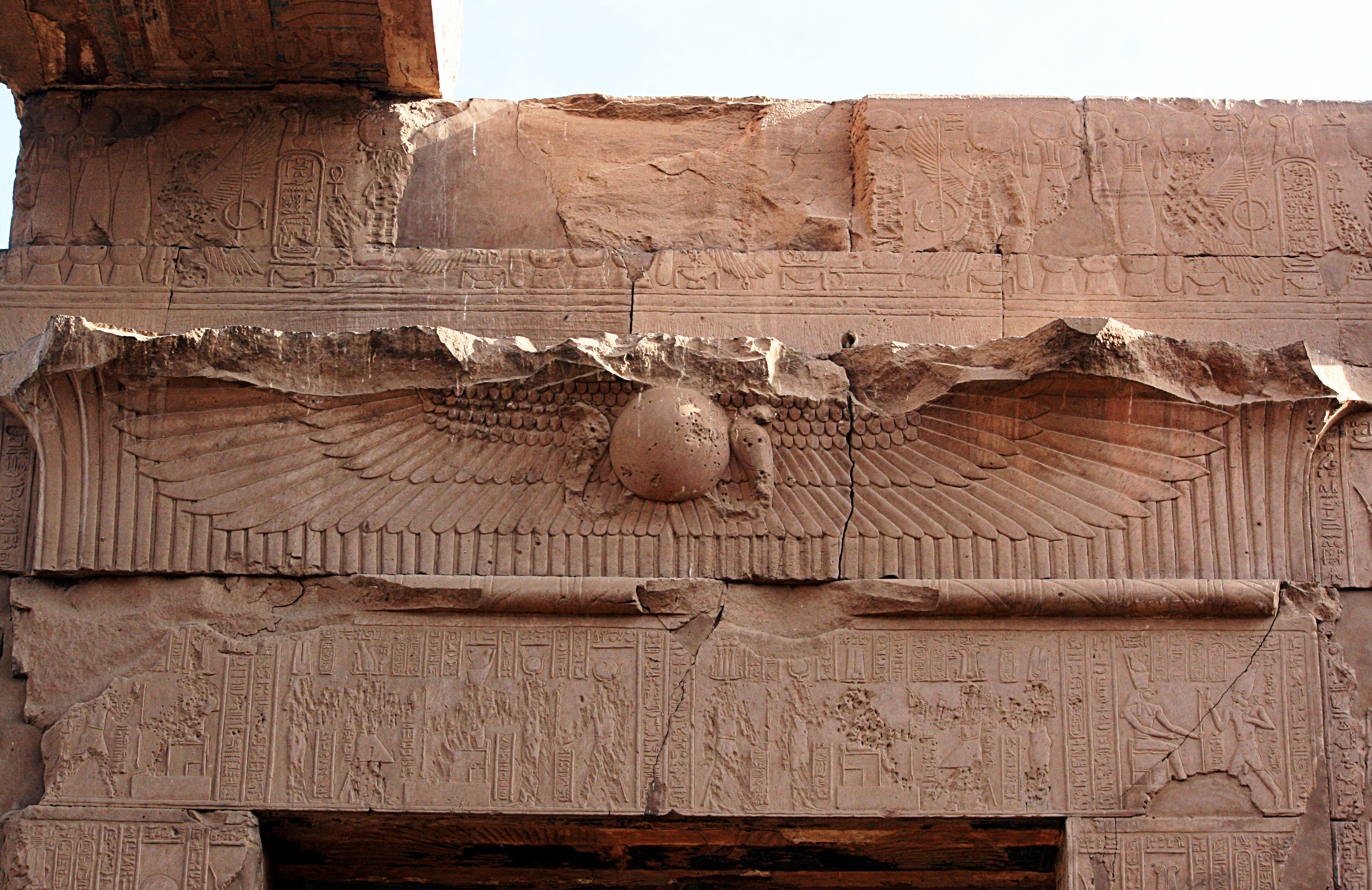
The winged sun over the temple of Kom Ombo

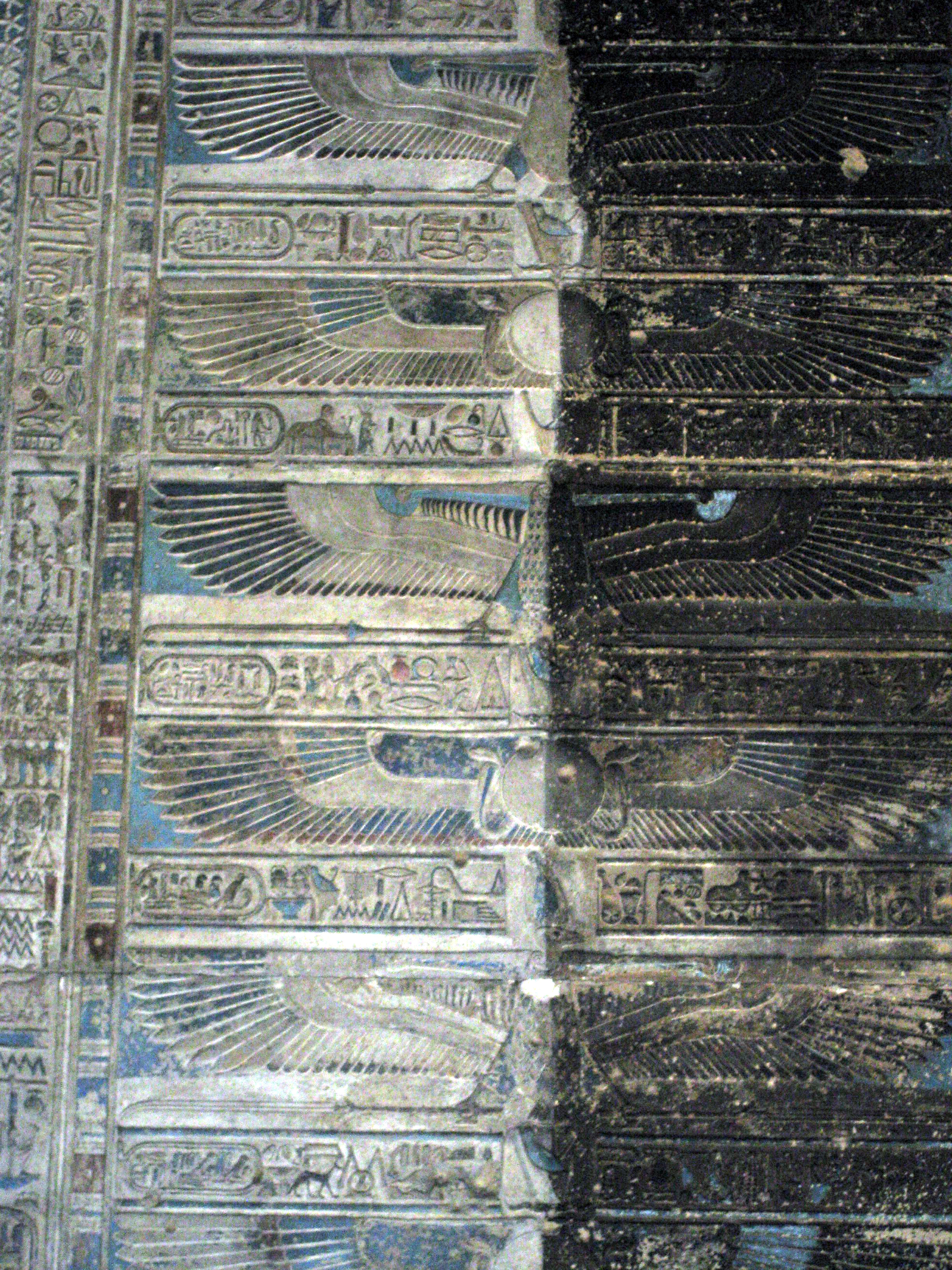
Relief of the winged sun in the temple of Hathor

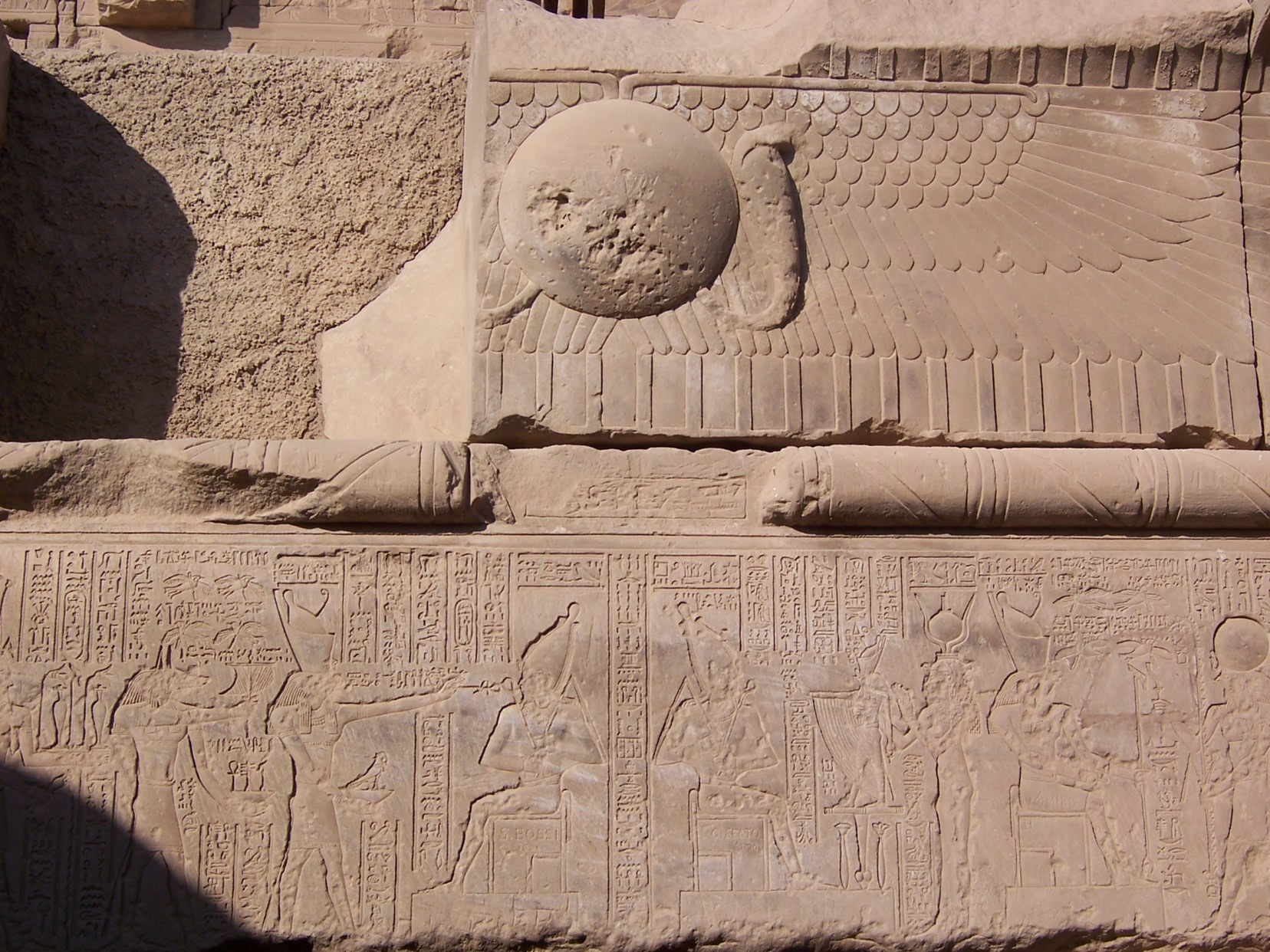
The winged sun in the Dendera Hathor Temple Complex

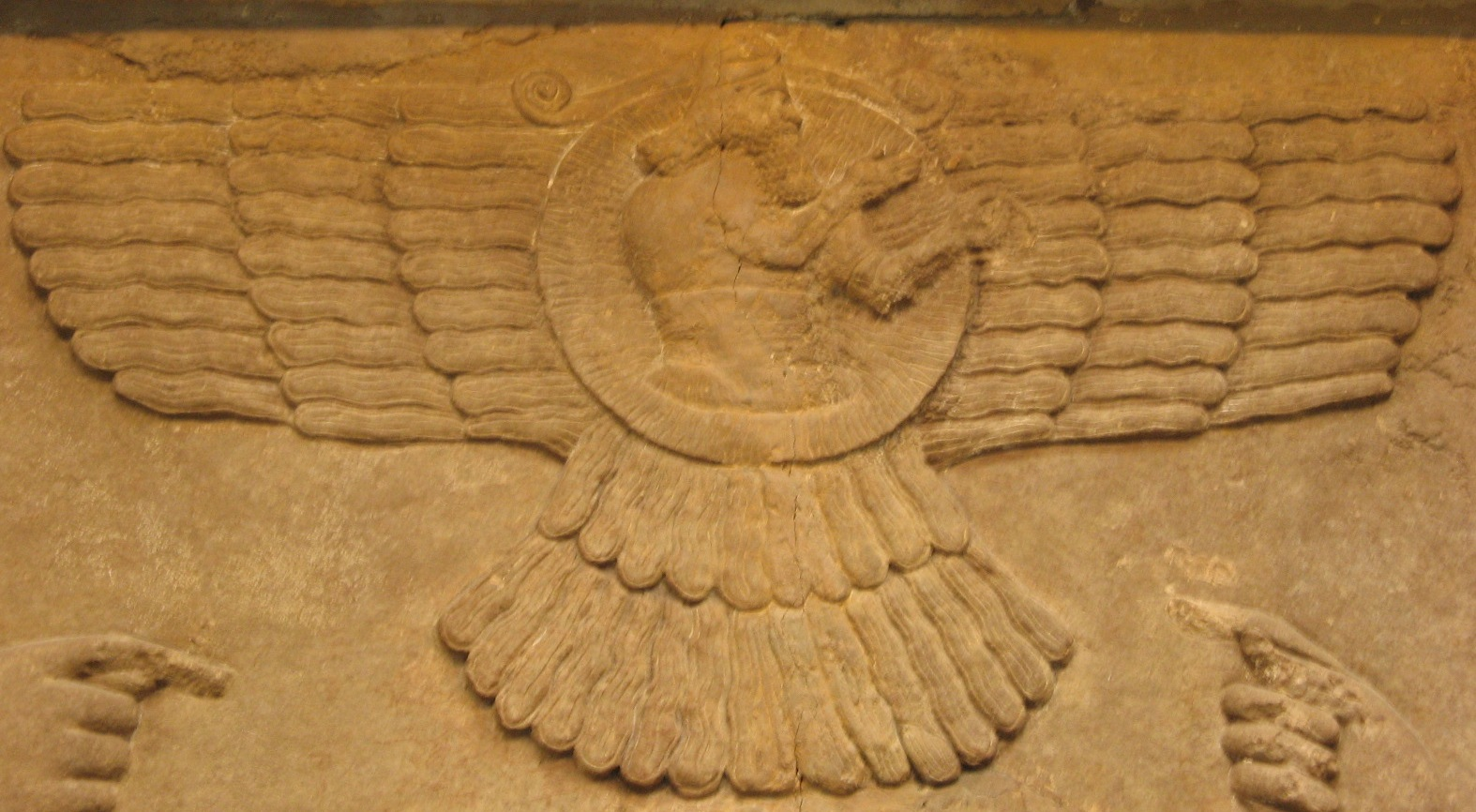
Male figure in an Assyrian winged sun emblem (Northwest Palace of Nimrud, Nineveh 9th century BC; British Museum room B, panel 23). This iconography later gave rise to the Faravahar symbol of Zoroastrianism.

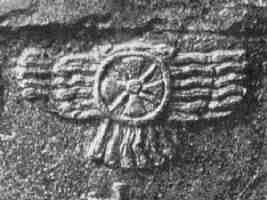
Stele to Assurnasiripal II at Nimrud (9th century BC), detail showing the winged sun.

== Mesopotamia ==
From roughly 2000 BCE, the symbol also appears in Mesopotamia. It appears in reliefs with Assyrian rulers as a symbol for royalty, transcribed into Latin as SOL SUUS (literally, "his own self, the Sun", i.e. "His Majesty").

== Illyria ==
Early figurative evidence of the celestial cult in Illyria is provided by 6th century BCE plaques from Lake Shkodra, which belonged to the Illyrian tribal area of what was referred in historical sources to as the Labeatae in later times. Each of those plaques portray simultaneously sacred representations of the sky and the sun, and symbolism of lightning and fire, as well as the sacred tree and birds (eagles). In those plaques there is a recurrent mythological representation of the celestial deity: the Sun deity animated with a face and two wings, throwing lightning into a fire altar, which in some plaques is held by two men (sometimes on two boats).

== Iran ==
In Zoroastrian Persia, the symbol of the winged sun became part of the iconography of the Faravahar, the symbol of the divine power and royal glory in Persian culture.

== Judah ==
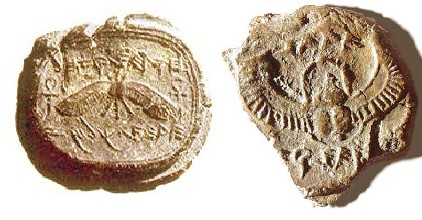
Seal of Hezekiah, 727 to 698. Winged disk representing God

From around the 8th century BC, the winged solar disk appears on Hebrew seals connected to the royal house of the Kingdom of Judah. Many of these are seals and jar handles from Hezekiah's reign, together with the inscription l'melekh ("belonging to the king"). Typically, Hezekiah's royal seals feature two downward-pointing wings and six rays emanating from the central sun disk, and some are flanked on either side with the Egyptian ankh ("key of life") symbol. Prior to this, there are examples from the seals of servants of king Ahaz and of king Uzziah.

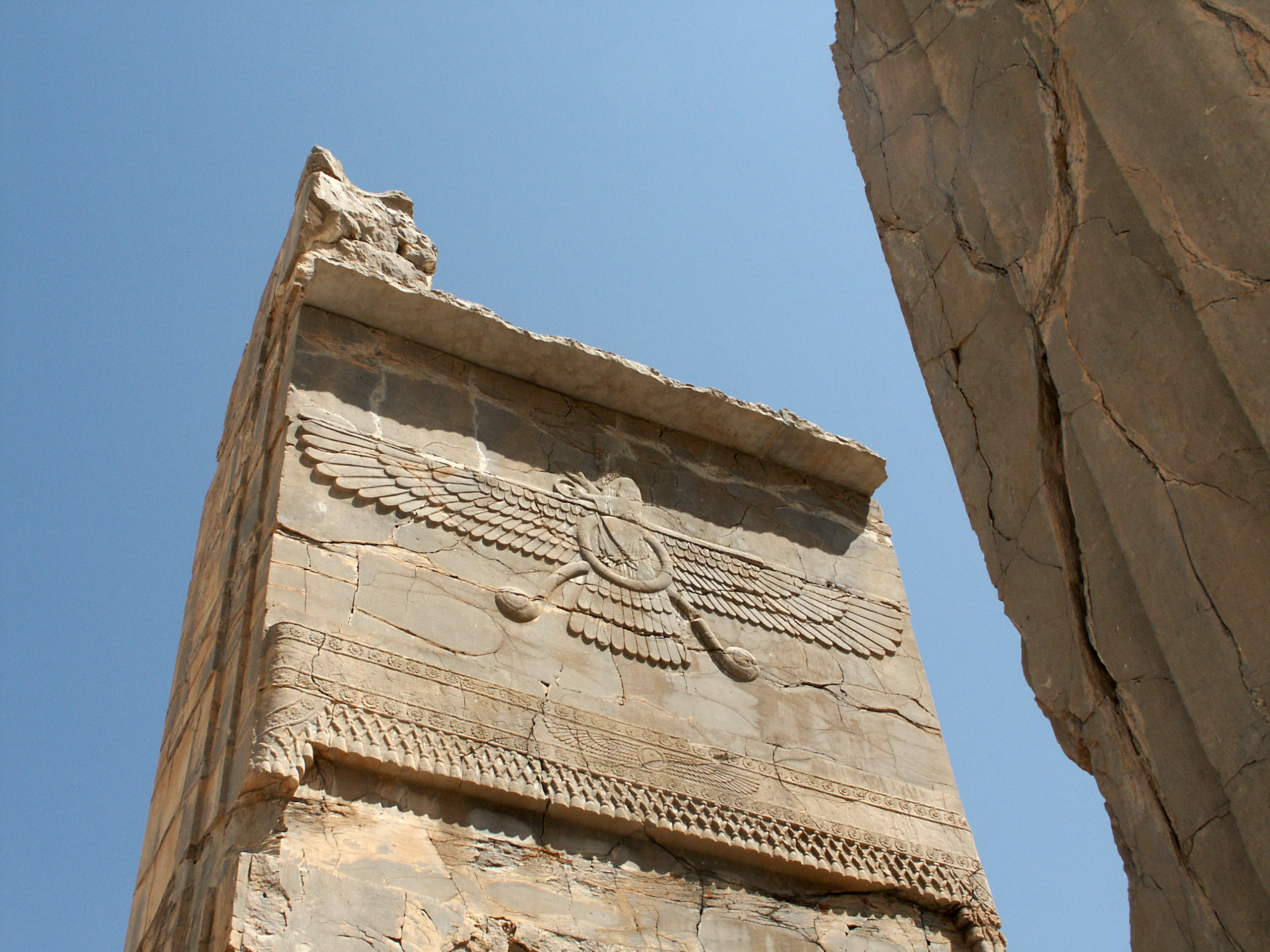
Faravahar in the Persepolis with another smaller winged sun below it

Compare also Malachi 4:2, referring to a winged "Sun of righteousness",

But unto you that fear my name shall the Sun of righteousness arise with healing in his wings...

— Malachi 4:2 KJV

== Greece ==
The winged sun is conventionally depicted as the knob of the caduceus, the staff of Hermes.

== Modern use ==
Various groups such as Freemasonry, Rosicrucianism, Thelema, Theosophy, and Unity Church have also used it. The symbol was used on the cover of Charles Taze Russell's textbook series Studies in the Scriptures beginning with the 1911 editions.

The winged sun symbol is also cited by proponents of the pseudoscientific Nibiru cataclysm.

=== Secular use ===
A winged sun logo used by the Worthington Corporation, a former manufacturer of pumps and industrial machinery

A winged sun is used in the heraldry of the North America Trade Directory.

Variations of the symbol are used as a trademark logo on vehicles produced by the Chrysler Corporation, Mini, Bentley Motors, Lagonda (Aston Martin) and Harley Davidson.

Since WW2, military aircraft of the United States have carried the insignia of a circle with stripes extending from each side like wings. Whether this is coincidental or some symbolic resemblance was intended is unknown. A five-pointed star is inscribed within the circle.

Regarding its video game usage, the symbol has become a common motif in the Sonic the Hedgehog franchise, most notably featured on title screens displaying the main character, as well as a stylized version appearing as a symbol for religious mechanics and buildings in Civilization VI, among others. A stylised version appears in the Delta Rune, a prophetic symbol appearing in Undertale and its parallel story Deltarune.

== See also ==
- Winged genie

== Bibliography ==
- R. Mayer, Opificius, Die geflügelte Sonne, Himmels- und Regendarstellungen im Alten Vorderasien, UF 16 (1984) 189-236.
- D. Parayre, Carchemish entre Anatolie et Syrie à travers l'image du disque solaire ailé (ca. 1800-717 av. J.-C.), Hethitica 8 (1987) 319-360.
- D. Parayre, Les cachets ouest-sémitiques à travers l'image du disque solaire ailé, Syria 67 (1990) 269-314.
