= Official Coal Miners' Memorial for the Commonwealth of Virginia =

Coordinates: 37°05′41″N 81°47′50″W

The Miner's Memorial in Richlands, Tazewell County, Virginia, was named the "Official Coal Miner's Memorial for the Commonwealth of Virginia" on 22 June 2009. It is meant to memorialize those who have lost their lives in the hazardous profession of coal mining and to honor the living men and women who continue to go into the darkness to make a living.

On the back of the black granite monument are written 1,200 names of persons who have lost their lives in the coal mines of Tazewell, Russell and Buchanan counties in southwest Virginia. The front is graced by images of the industry created by artists Ellen Elmes and Jack Hagerman; the life size, life like bronze statue in front of the monument, which portrays a miner on his way home after a day in the mine, was sculpted by Maria Kirby Smith. A small landscaped park with a waterfall and a lighted brick walkway surrounds the monument.
