= Dahshur =

Village in Giza Governorate, Egypt

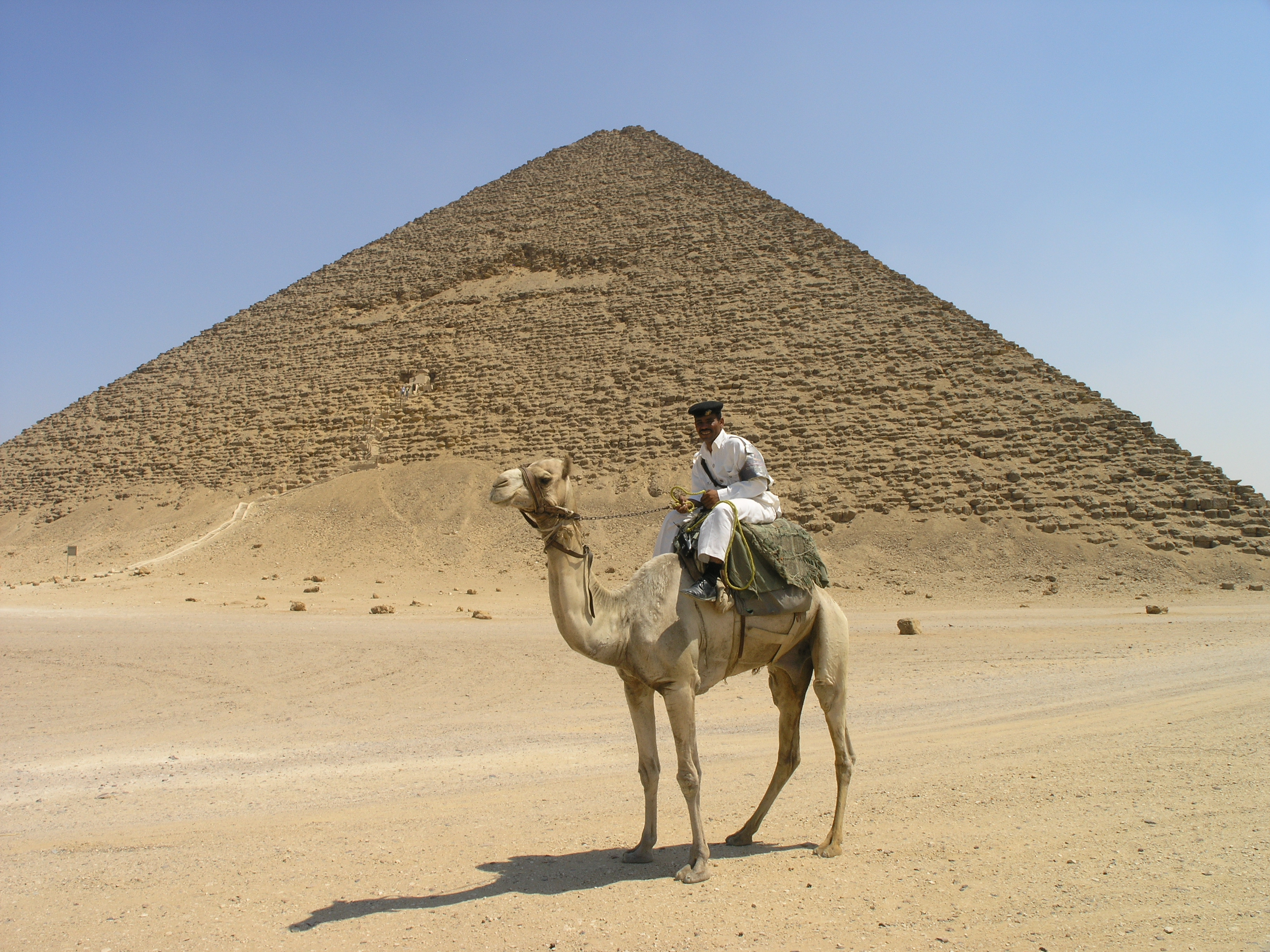
- Sneferu's Red Pyramid

- Location within Egypt
- 29°48′23″N 31°12′29″E
- Type: Necropolis
- Periods: Old Kingdom to Middle Kingdom
- Location: Giza Governorate, Egypt

History
- Built: 2613–2589 BC
- Built by: Sneferu

UNESCO World Heritage Site
- Part of: "Pyramid fields from Giza to Dahshur" part of Memphis and its Necropolis – the Pyramid Fields from Giza to Dahshur
- Includes: Bent Pyramid; Red Pyramid; White Pyramid; Pyramid of Senusret III; Pyramid of Amenemhat III
- Criteria: Cultural: (i), (iii), (vi)
- Reference: 86-002
- Inscription: 1979 (3rd Session)
- Area: 16,203.36 ha (62.5615 sq mi)

Dahshur (Note: Also transliterated Dahshour) (in English often called Dashur; Arabic: دهشور Dahšūr pronounced [dɑhˈʃuːɾ]) is an ancient Egyptian pyramid complex and necropolis and shares the name of the nearby village of Manshiyyat Dahshur (Arabic: منشأة دهشور) in markaz Badrashin, Giza.

Dahshur is listed as a UNESCO World Heritage Site, and is located on the Western Desert plateau at the edge of the cultivated plain, and along with the pyramid complexes at Saqqara, Abusir, and Giza, to its north, forms the pyramid fields of the ancient capital city of Memphis. It is known chiefly for several pyramids, mainly Sneferu's Bent Pyramid and the Red Pyramid, which are among the oldest, largest and best preserved in Egypt, built from 2613 to 2589 BC.

== Pyramids ==
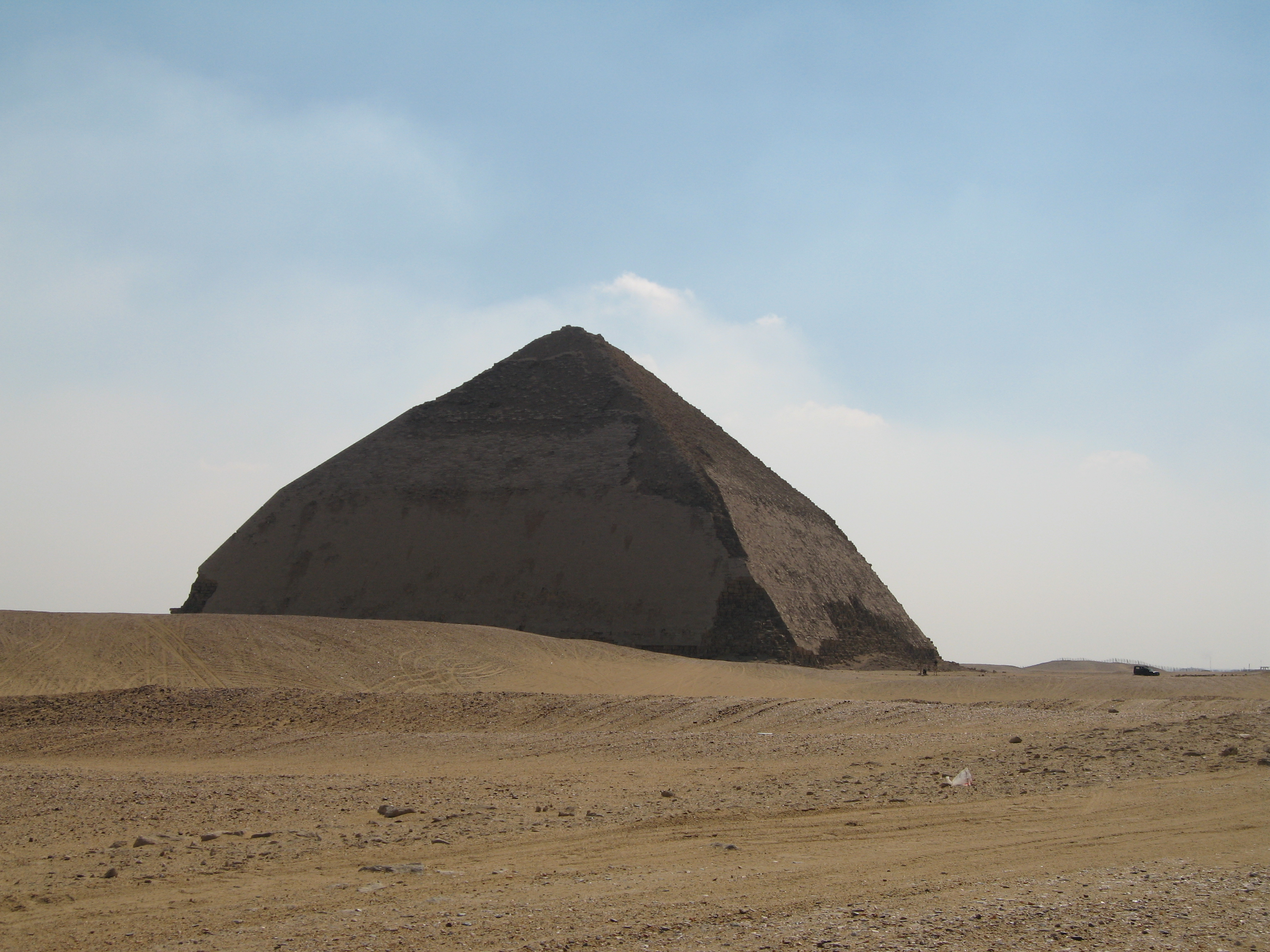
Sneferu's Bent Pyramid

The Dahshur pyramids were an extremely important learning experience for the Egyptians. It provided them with the knowledge and know-how to transition from step-sided pyramids to smooth-sided pyramids. Ultimately their breadth of experience would allow them to build the Great Pyramid of Giza; the last of the Seven Wonders of the Ancient World still standing to this date.

The first of the Dahshur pyramids was the Bent Pyramid (2613–2589 BC), built under the rule of King Sneferu. The Bent Pyramid was the first attempt at building a smooth sided pyramid, but proved to be an unsuccessful build due to the miscalculations made on the structural weight that was being placed onto the soft ground (sand, gravel, and clay), which had a tendency to subside. Other calculations that were proven to be erroneous were that the blocks being used were cut in such a manner that when placed onto the pyramid their weight was not distributed appropriately, causing the angle of the pyramid to be off and achieving the name "the Bent Pyramid".

Realizing his shortcomings and learning from his mistakes, King Sneferu ordered the building of the second pyramid of Dahshur, the Red Pyramid. Once completed, the pyramid was considered to be a success, as it was a fully constructed, smooth sided, and a free standing pyramid rising to a height of 341 feet (104 meters), with an angle of 43 degrees. The Red Pyramid's name derives from the material that was used to construct the pyramid, red limestone. This pyramid is believed to be the resting place of King Sneferu.

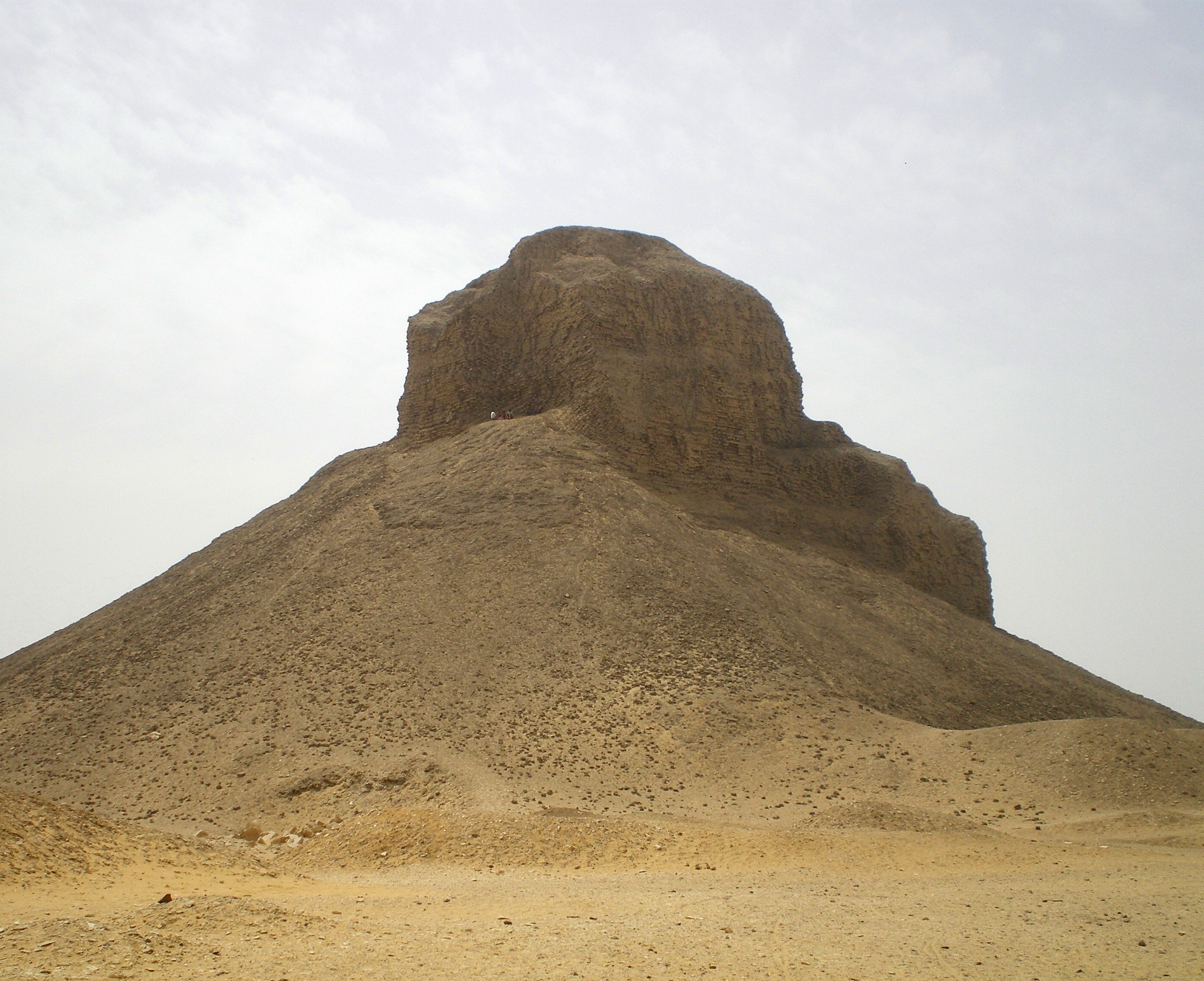
The Black Pyramid

Another pyramid, the White Pyramid, located within Dahshur is that of the 12th Dynasty King Amenemhat II (1929–1895 BC). This pyramid has not been preserved as well as the others within the area due to the materials that were used to fill it (sand on the outside and limestone on the inside). The weather caused the sand to erode from it, but the limestone was taken intentionally for use on other pyramids allowing the pyramid to collapse and ultimately desecrating the tomb of King Amenemhat II.

King Senusret III (1878–1839 BC) had his pyramid built within Dahshur. The difference between his pyramid in comparison to those surrounding it was that King Senusret III had tombs and galleries built underneath it for two princesses; Sit-Hathor and Merit.

The Black Pyramid dates from the later reign of Amenemhat III and, although badly eroded, it remains the most imposing monument at the site after the two Sneferu pyramids. The polished granite pyramidion or capstone of the Black Pyramid is on display in the main hall of the Egyptian Museum in Cairo.

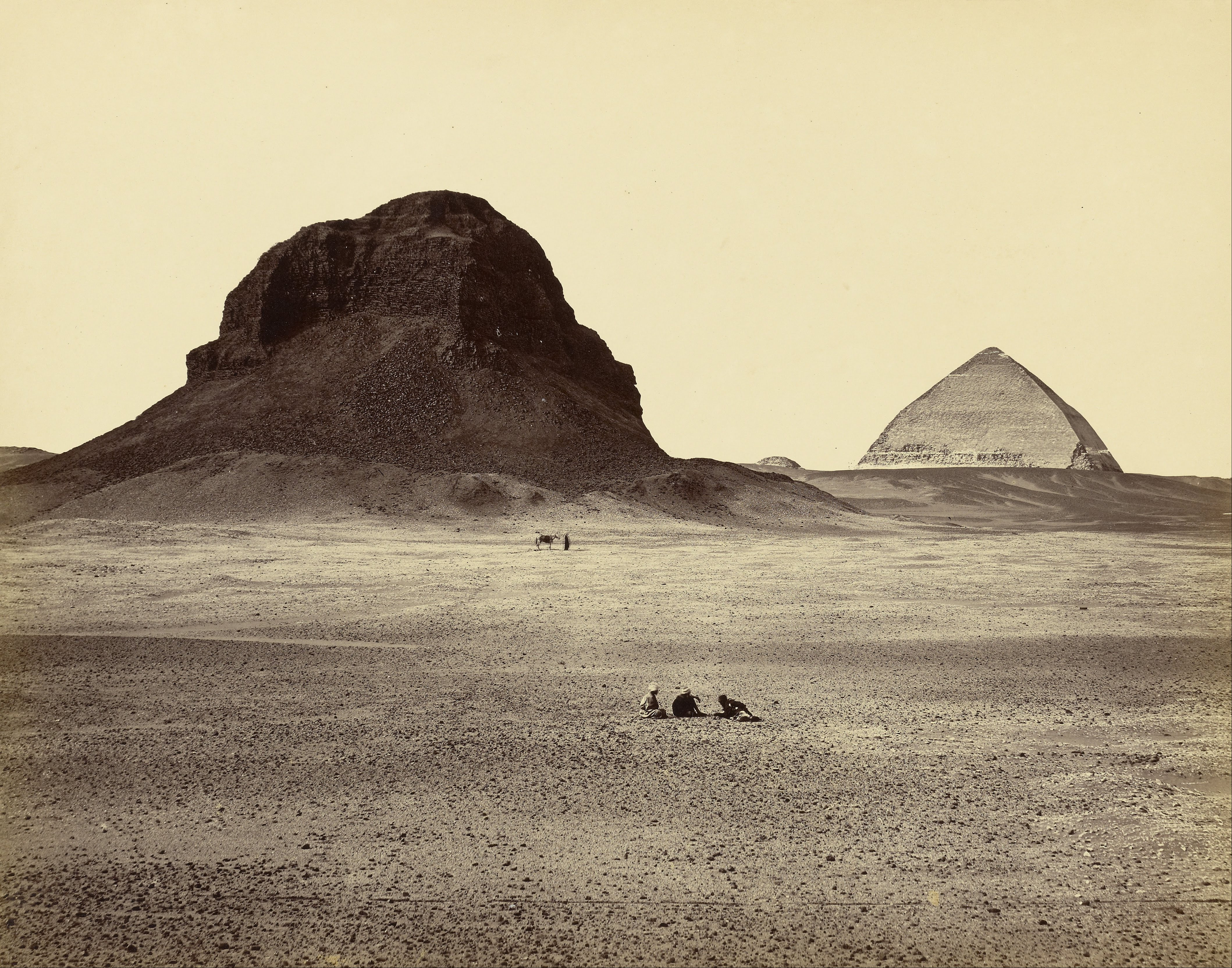
The Pyramids of Dahshur, From the East (black pyramid left, bent pyramid right) by Francis Frith (1857)

Several other pyramids of the 13th Dynasty were built at Dahshur. Only the Pyramid of Ameny Qemau has been excavated so far by Ahmad Fakhri, the archaeologist who excavated this site.

== Tombs and cemeteries ==
Located closely to the pyramid of the 12th Dynasty several undisturbed tombs of royal women were found, containing a large amount of lapidary and jewelry that have been determined to be of the highest stage of metalworking in Egypt during this time period. The pyramid of Senusret III was part of a huge complex, with several smaller pyramids of royal women, along with another pyramid to the south. In a gallery tomb next to this pyramid were found two treasures of the king's daughters (Sithathor). Extensive cemeteries of officials of the Old Kingdom and Middle Kingdom have been found around Dahshur's pyramids. Dahshur was Egypt's royal necropolis during the reign of the 12th Dynasty king Amenemhat II.

== Contemporary history ==
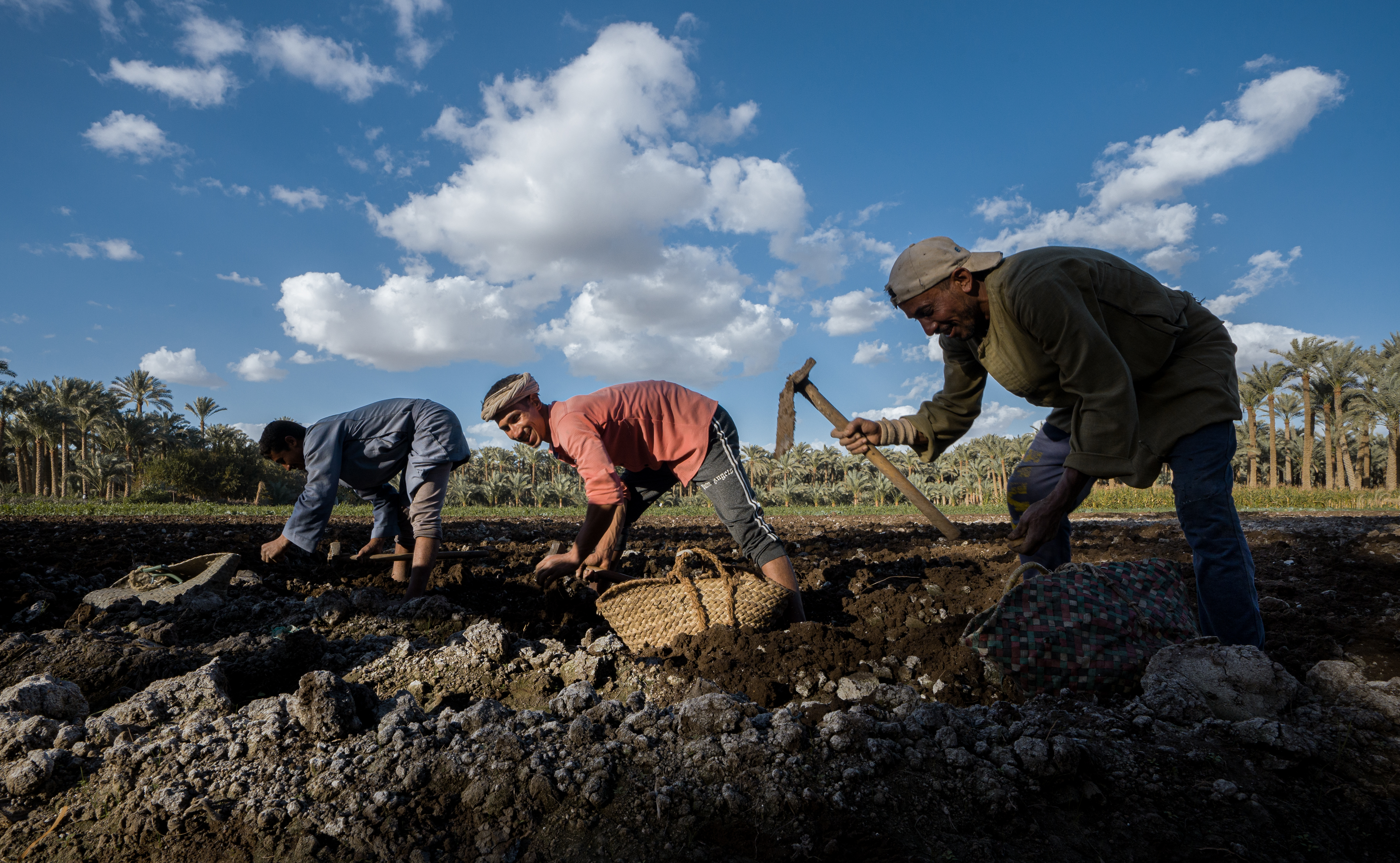
Potato cultivation in Dahshur

In July 2012, Dahshur's entire Christian community, which some estimate to be as many as 120 families, fled to nearby towns due to sectarian violence. The violence began in a dispute over a badly ironed shirt, which in turn escalated into a fight in which a Christian burned a Muslim Arab clan member to death. Furthermore, during clashes another Muslim suffered head injuries and later died due to a gasoline bomb being thrown from a rooftop of a building. At least 16 homes and properties of Christians were pillaged, some were torched, and a church was damaged during the violence. This incident was reported internationally.

As of January 2013, and due to the security vacuum that still prevails in Egypt following the 2011 uprising, the site is under threat of desecration and damage due to encroachment by locals of surrounding urban settlements.

== Climate ==
Dahshur has a hot desert climate (BWh) according to the Köppen-Geiger climate classification system.

Climate data for Dahshur
| Month | Jan | Feb | Mar | Apr | May | Jun | Jul | Aug | Sep | Oct | Nov | Dec | Year |
|---|---|---|---|---|---|---|---|---|---|---|---|---|---|
| Mean daily maximum °C (°F) | 19.7 (67.5) | 21.3 (70.3) | 24.7 (76.5) | 29.3 (84.7) | 33.5 (92.3) | 35.6 (96.1) | 36 (97) | 35.6 (96.1) | 33.2 (91.8) | 31 (88) | 26.2 (79.2) | 21.5 (70.7) | 29.0 (84.2) |
| Daily mean °C (°F) | 13.6 (56.5) | 14.6 (58.3) | 17.7 (63.9) | 21.3 (70.3) | 25.3 (77.5) | 27.8 (82.0) | 28.7 (83.7) | 28.6 (83.5) | 26.5 (79.7) | 24.3 (75.7) | 20 (68) | 15.5 (59.9) | 22.0 (71.6) |
| Mean daily minimum °C (°F) | 7.5 (45.5) | 8 (46) | 10.7 (51.3) | 13.4 (56.1) | 17.2 (63.0) | 20 (68) | 21.4 (70.5) | 21.6 (70.9) | 19.8 (67.6) | 17.7 (63.9) | 13.9 (57.0) | 9.5 (49.1) | 15.1 (59.1) |
| Average precipitation mm (inches) | 3 (0.1) | 2 (0.1) | 2 (0.1) | 1 (0.0) | 0 (0) | 0 (0) | 0 (0) | 0 (0) | 0 (0) | 0 (0) | 2 (0.1) | 4 (0.2) | 14 (0.6) |
Source: Climate-Data.org

== See also ==
- Memphite Necropolis
- List of ancient Egyptian towns and cities
- List of ancient Egyptian sites, including sites of temples
- List of megalithic sites
- Acanthus (Egypt), an old village in Dahshur mentioned in Ancient Greek literature.
