= Memphis and its Necropolis – the Pyramid Fields from Giza to Dahshur =

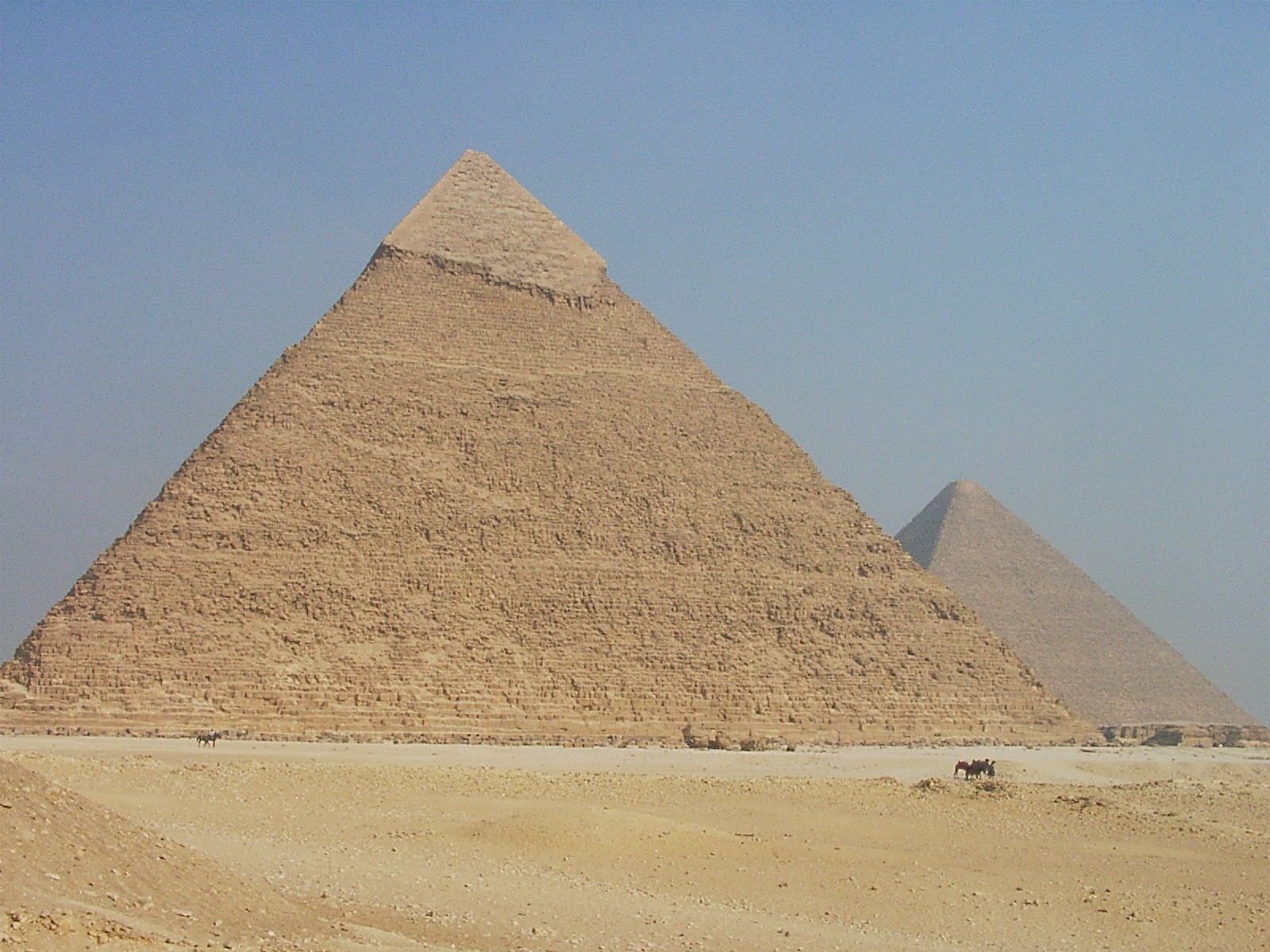
Khafre's pyramid from South, with the remnants of the satellite pyramid, and Khufu's Great Pyramid at behind

Memphis and its Necropolis – the Pyramid Fields from Giza to Dahshur is a World Heritage Site (WHS No. 86). It includes:

- Site of Memphis, WHS No. 086-001
- Pyramid fields from Giza to Dahshur, WHS No. 086-002
