= Pyramidion of Amenemhat III =

Capstone of the Black Pyramid in Egypt

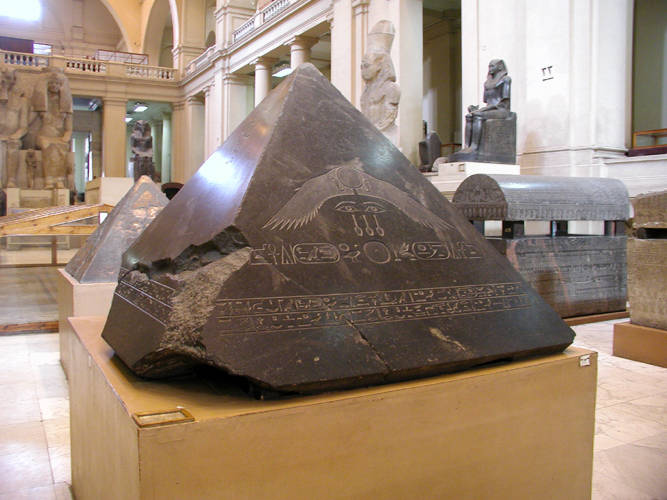
- Material: Basalt
- Height: 1.40 metres (4.6 ft)
- Width: 1.85 metres (6.1 ft)
- Weight: c. 4.5 tonnes (9,900 lb)
- Writing: Egyptian
- Created: c. 1850 BC
- Discovered: 1900; Dahshur, Giza, Egypt
- Present location: Egyptian Museum, Cairo, Egypt
- Identification: JE 35133

The Pyramidion of Amenemhat III is the capstone that once crowned the Black Pyramid at Dashur, Egypt. Crafted around 1850 BC, towards the end of the 12th Dynasty during the Middle Kingdom, it remained mostly intact and is now located in the Egyptian Museum in Cairo.

== Rediscovery ==
In 1900, the then-director of the Department of Antiquities Gaston Maspero had Dashur inspected, after the guards at the Saqqara necropolis were attacked by robbers. On the east side of the pyramid of Amenemhat, a grey block was found sticking out of the sand, which, upon closer inspection, was decorated with beautiful inscriptions. After excavation, the pyramidion was transported to the Egyptian Museum in Cairo.

== Description ==
The pyramidion, carved out of single piece of basalt (often called black granite), is mostly intact apart from a broken corner. With a height of 1.40 metres (4.6 ft) and base length 1.85 metres (6.1 ft), it weighs around 4.5 tonnes (9,900 lb). The bottom edges are undercut to keep the block in position atop the pyramid.

=== Inscriptions ===
The four upper faces were polished and inscribed. The side which pointed to the east is adorned with a winged sun disk flanked by two uraei. Below, two wedjat represent the eyes of the king himself. Further down, three nefer signs stand for beauty or perfection. Finally, a sun disk represents the god Ra, from which the throne name of Amenemhat "Ni-maat-re" extends to the right and his personal name "Imen-em-hat" to the left. As a whole, the composition reads: "Amenemhat beholds the perfection of Ra".

Along the bottom of the four upper faces, two lines of inscriptions run:

Eastern Face

The eastern commences with: (top row) "Words spoken, may the sight be open to the king of upper and lower Egypt, the lord of the two lands, Nimaatre, so he may see the lord of the horizon and his crossing of the upper sky. May it be given the appearing to the Son of Ra, Amenemhat, as a god, lord of everlasting and indestructible. (bottom row) Word spoken, by the sovereign, I have given the beautiful horizon, the Two Ladies (Nekhbet and Wadjet), and he who takes the inheritance of the two lands, so you may rest upon it, which pleases the sky. Word spoken by the horizon: may you rest upon it, which please the sky".

Northern Face

The northern commences with: (top row) "Word spoken, higher is the Ba of the king of upper and lower Egypt, Nimaatre, than the height of Orion as it joins the Duat. Ra-Horakhty, he makes firm, the Son of Ra, of his body, Amenemhat, who is in the midst of the northern starry sky, and Neith who is content concerning it". (bottom row - starting from the centre proceeding to the left) The living Horus, great of might, the Two Ladies (Nebty), who inherited the two lands, the golden Horus - enduring of life, the Son of Ra - Amenemhat, given life, like Ra, forever. (back to the center proceeding to the right) The living Horus, great of might, the Two Ladies, who inherited the two lands, the golden Horus, enduring of life, the king of Upper and Lower Egypt, Nimaatre, given life, like Ra, forever".

Western Face

The western commences with: (top row) "... the great one, the ribs of Osiris, lord of the Thinite nome, that are under the feet of the good god, the lord of the two lands and of doing, the son of Ra, of his body, Amenemhat. Ptah, who is south of his wall, the lord of truth and the beloved Ankhtawy (the living two lands) ... (bottom row) Word spoken by Ptah, given all life, stability, power, to the good god, the golden Horus - enduring of life, Nimaatre. Words spoken by Sokar-Osiris, lord of all the living god, of ..."

Southern Face

The southern commences with: (top row) "Words spoken by, Imiut/Anubis, he who has upon his mountain, and behind the king of upper and lower Egypt, the lord of doing Nimaatre, united with the western desert inside the great shrine. The lord of good offering, who is in it and given it, his inheritance. The lord of eternity and for everlasting. (bottom row) Word spoken by Imuit/Anubis, I have given all places, good, pure and the spirit of the beautiful west to the king of upper and lower Egypt, the lord of the two lands, Nimaatre, commanding to him, may you rest the upon it, word spoken by the beautiful west, may you rest the upon it".

The name of the god Amen in Amenemhat's cartouches has been erased. If this was done during the reign of Akhenaten in the 18th Dynasty, the pyramidion may have laid on the ground since c. 1350 BC. The relative lack of damage raised the question whether or not it had ever been on top of the pyramid.

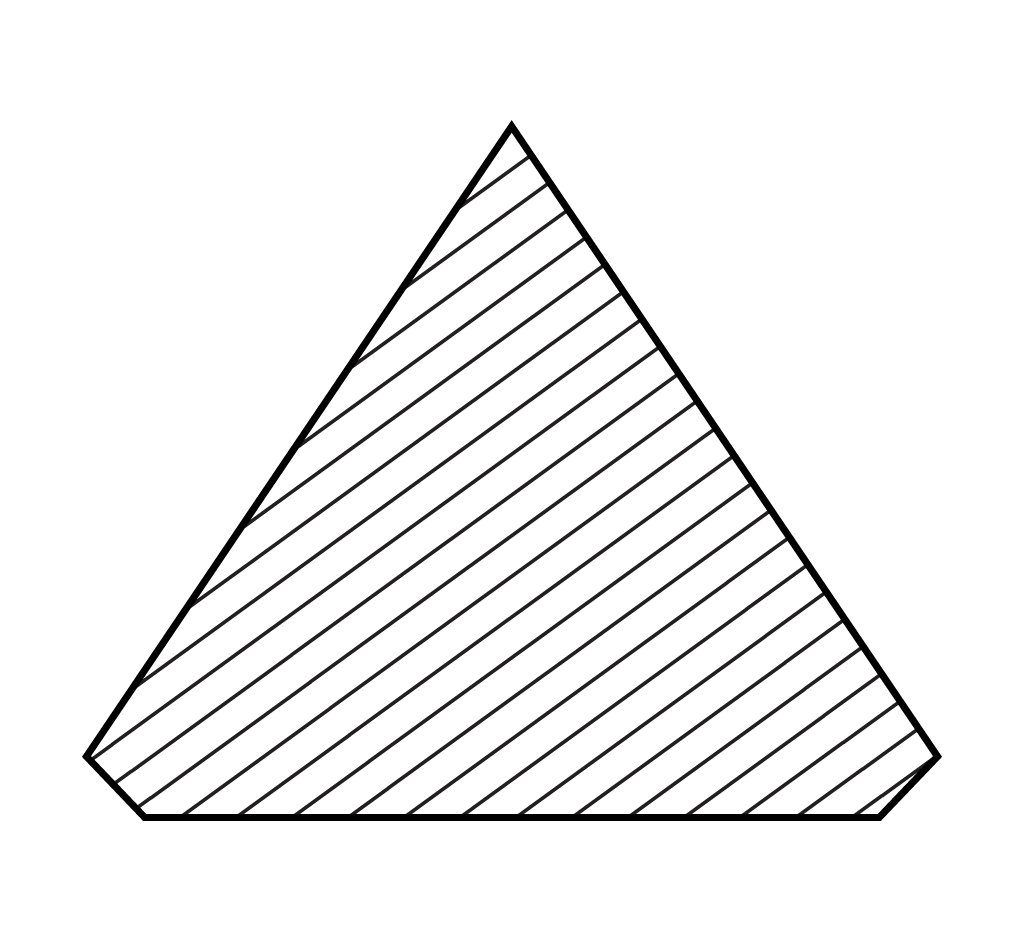
Cross section of the pyramidion

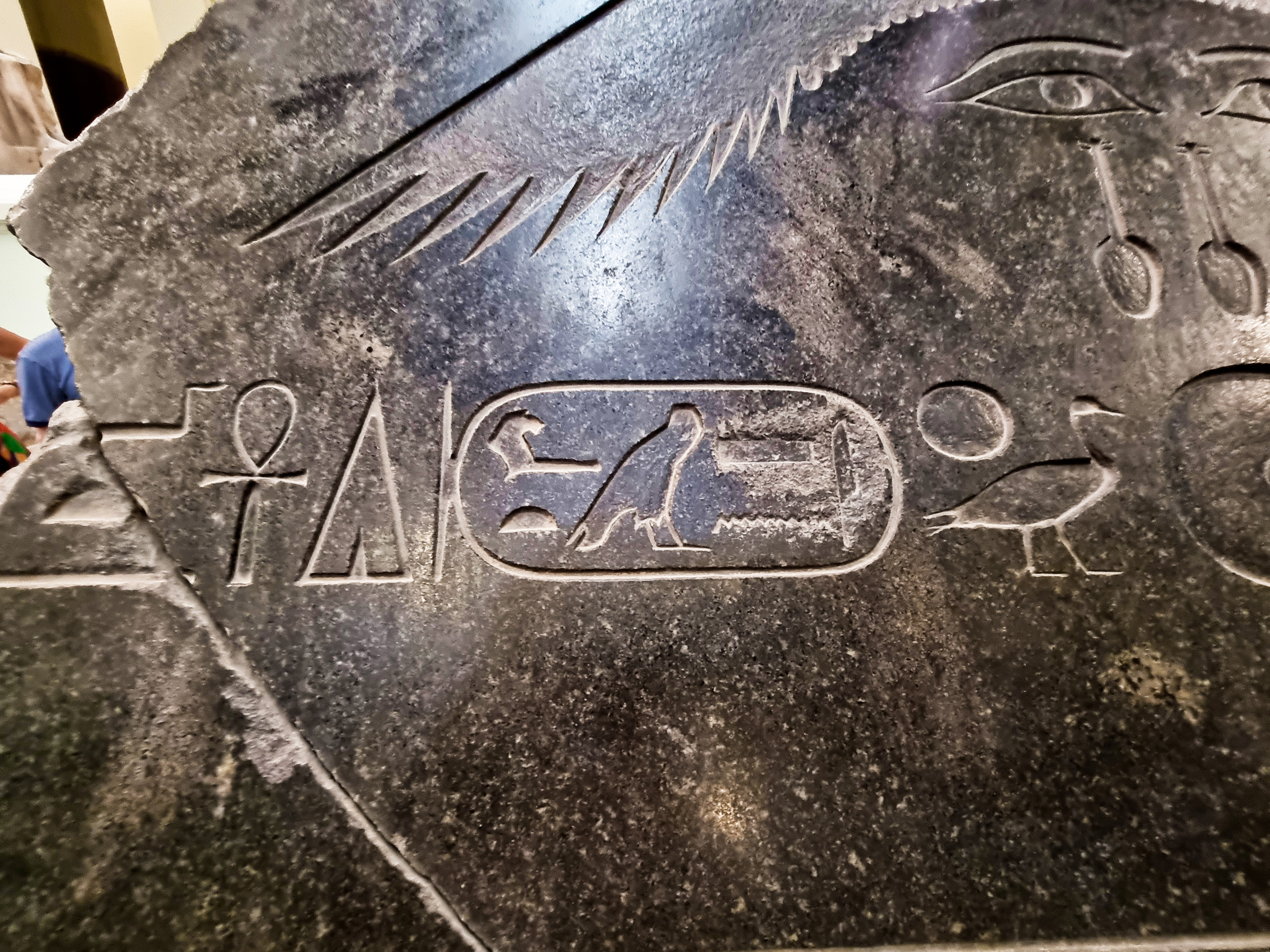
Name of god Amen erased

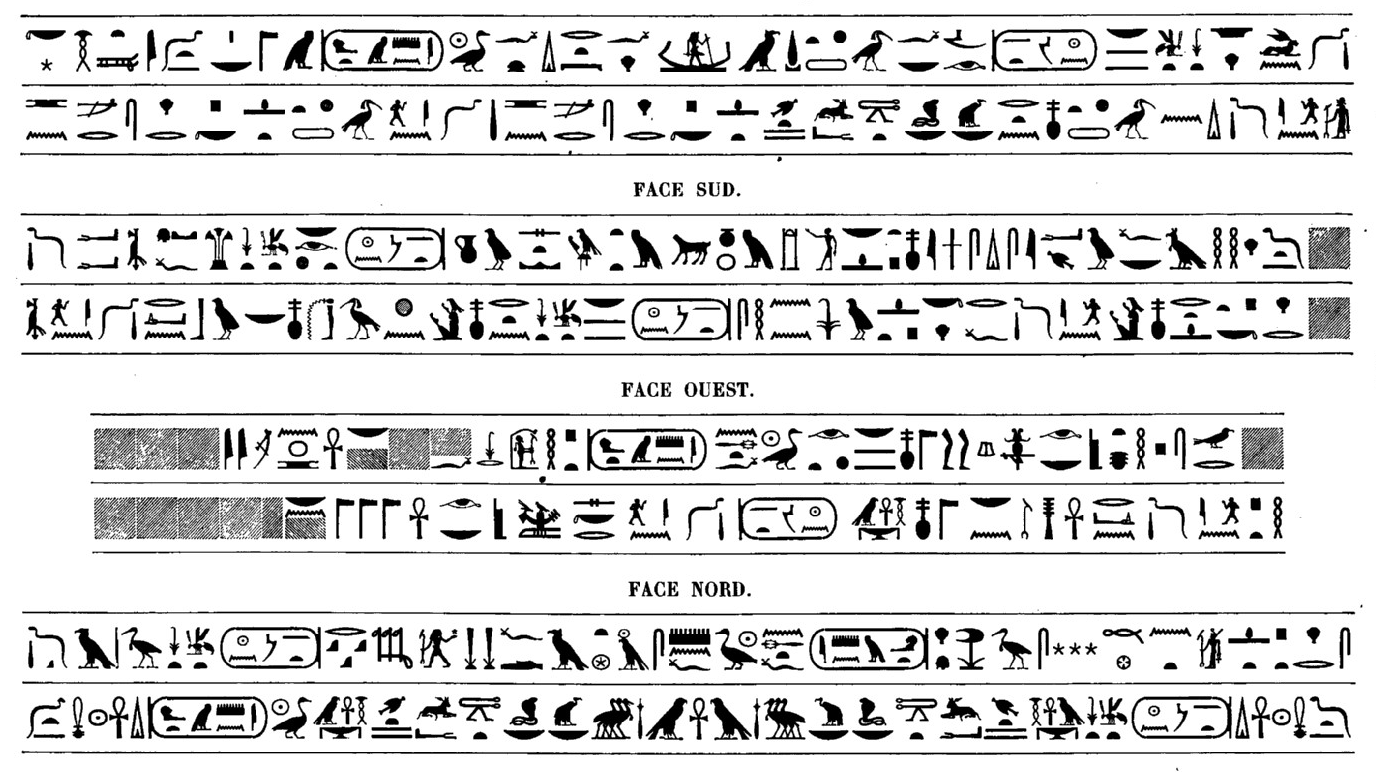
Inscriptions on the bottom of the four upper faces

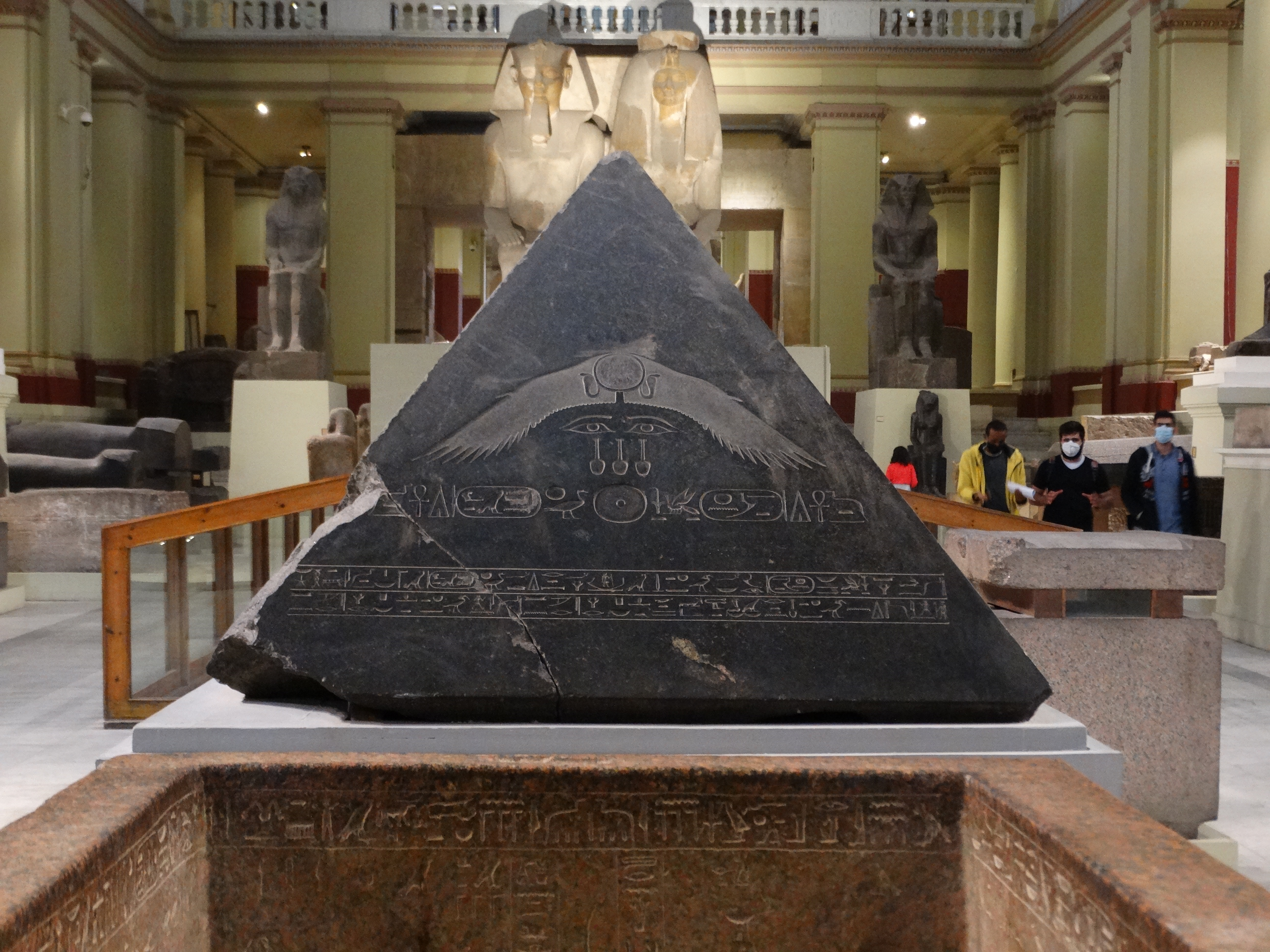
East face of the pyramidion

== See also ==
- List of Egyptian pyramidia

== Bibliography ==
- Lehner, Mark (1997). The Complete Pyramids. London: Thames and Hudson. p. 34. ISBN 0-500-05084-8.
- Maspero, Gaston (1902). "Note sur le pyramidion d'Amenemhaît III à Dahchour". Annales du service des antiquités de l'Égypte (in French). 3: 206–208.
- Schäfer, Heinrich (1863). "Die Spitze der Pyramide König Amenemhets III". Zeitschrift für ägyptische Sprache und Altertumskunde (in German). 41: 84–85.
- Verner, Miroslav (2001). The Pyramids: The Mystery, Culture, and Science of Egypt's Great Monuments. pp. 422–423. ISBN 978-0802139351.
