= Black granite =

Types of granite

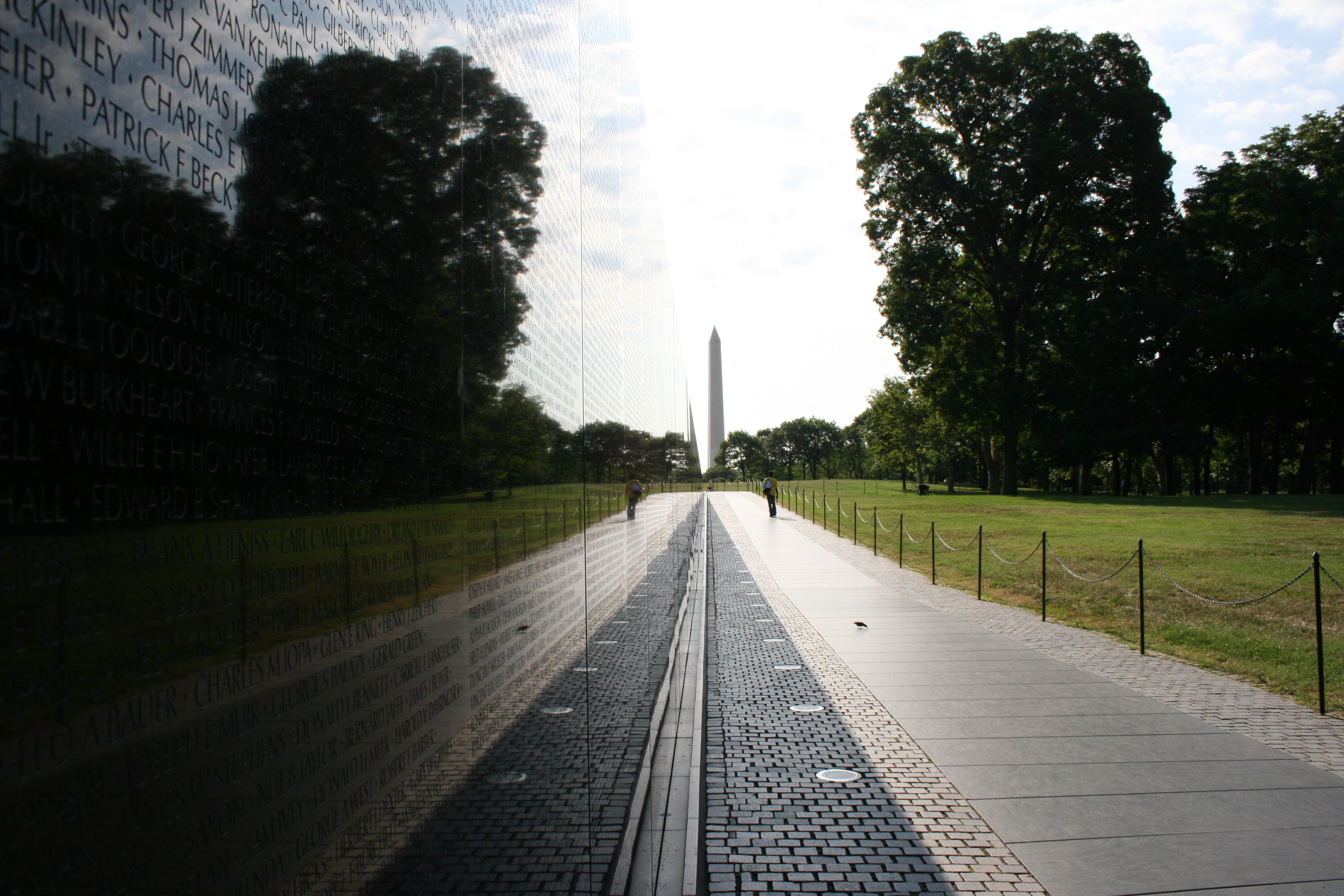
The Vietnam Veterans Memorial, a two-acre (8,100 m^{2}) site in Washington, D.C. featuring two black granite walls engraved with the names of those service members who died or remain missing in the Vietnam War

In the construction industry, black rocks that share the hardness and strength of granitic rocks are known as black granite. In geological terms, black granite might be gabbro, diabase, basalt, diorite, norite, or anorthosite.
