= Black Pyramid =

Middle Kingdom pyramid near Cairo, Egypt

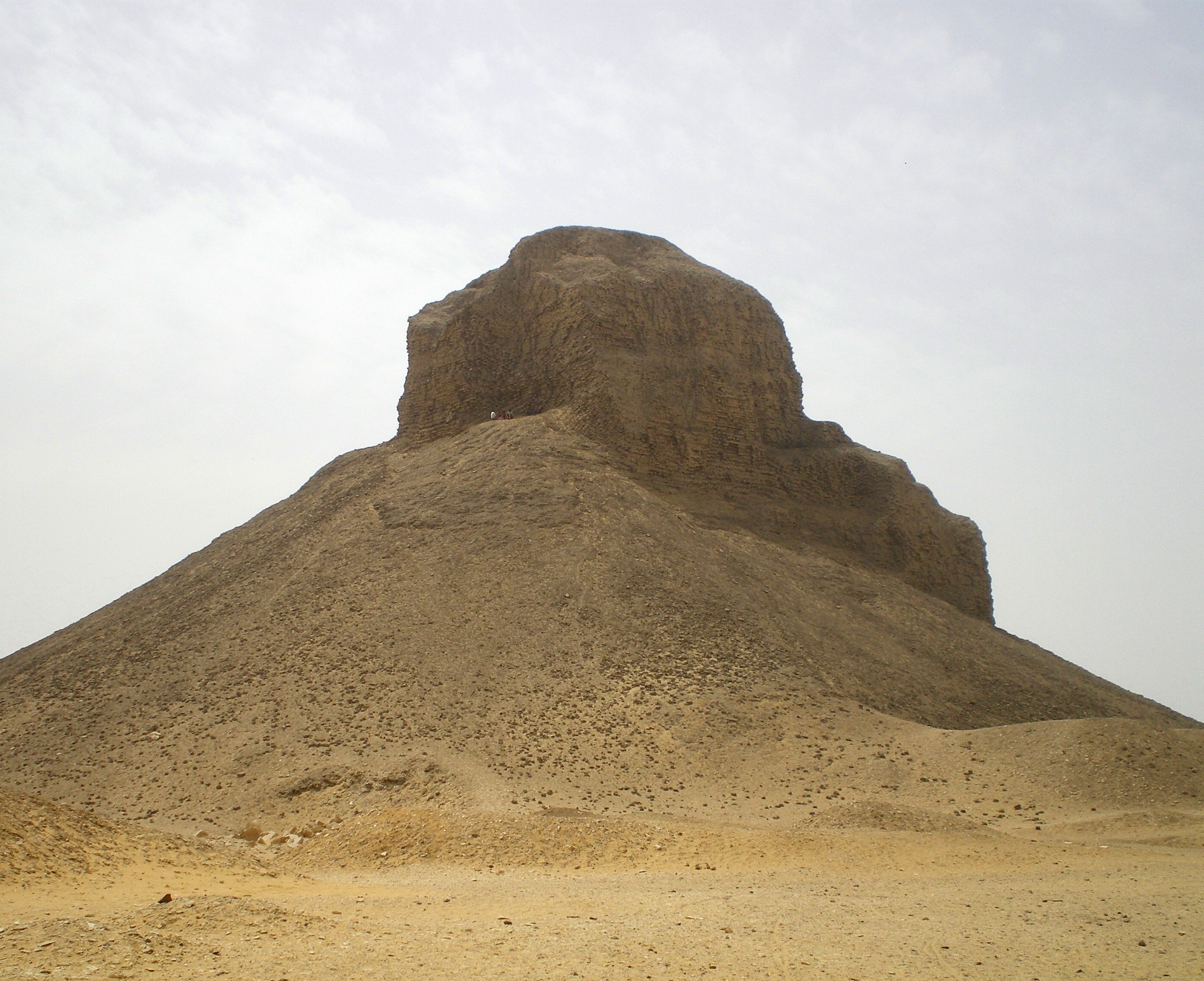
- The pyramid in 2008
- Interactive map of Black Pyramid
- 29°47′30″N 31°13′25″E
- Owner: Amenemhat III
Ancient name
< i mn n m HAt t > N29 A28 nfr O24
Jmn-m-h3t-q3-nfr=f
Imenemhat Qanefer
Amenemhat is mighty and perfect
- Constructed: c. 1850 BC
- Type: True pyramid (ruined)
- Height: c. 75 meters
- Base: 105 meters
- Slope: 59° (lower); 55° (upper)

The Black Pyramid (Egyptian Arabic: الهرم الأسود, romanized: al-Haram al-ʾAswad) was built by King Amenemhat III during the late Middle Kingdom of Egypt (2055–1650 BC).

It is one of the five remaining pyramids of the original 11 pyramids at Dahshur in Egypt. Originally named Amenemhet is Mighty, the pyramid earned the name Black Pyramid for its dark, decaying appearance as a rubble mound. The Black Pyramid was the first to house both the deceased king and his queens. Jacques de Morgan, on a French mission, began the excavation on the pyramids at Dahshur in 1892. The German Archaeological Institute of Cairo completed excavation in 1983.

== Structure ==
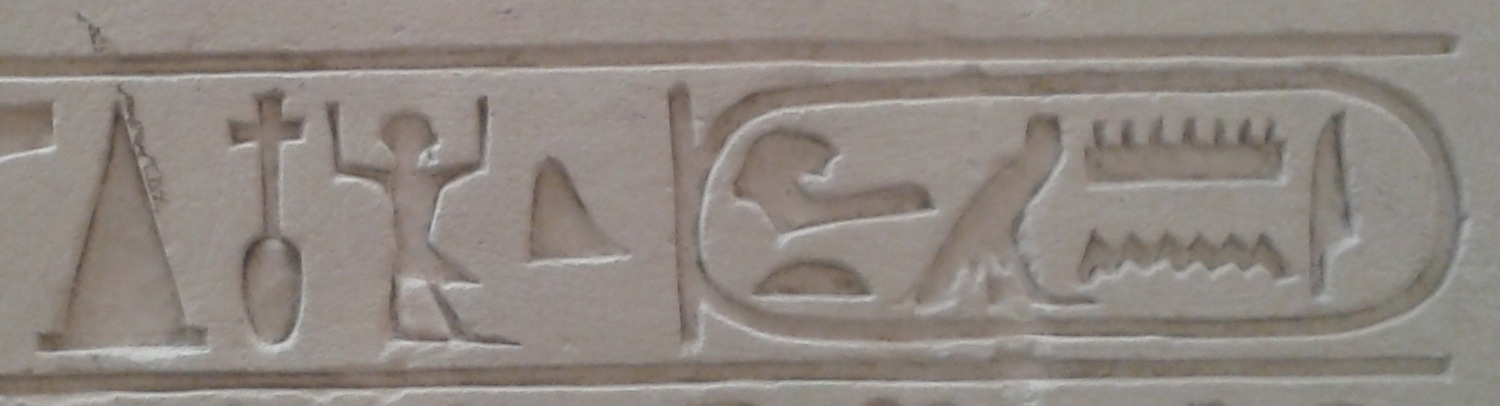
Name of the pyramid of Amenemhat III on a funerary stele, Musée du Louvre

The pyramid was originally about 75 metres (246 ft) tall with a base 105 metres (344 ft) long and an incline of 57°. Typical for pyramids of the Middle Kingdom, the Black Pyramid, although encased in limestone, is made of mud brick and clay instead of stone. The ground-level structures consist of the entrance opening into the courtyard and mortuary temple, surrounded by walls. There are two sets of walls; between them, there are ten shaft tombs, which are a type of burial structure formed from graves built into natural rock.

=== Superstructure ===
The pyramid was built with an east–west orientation and has two entrances located on the south-eastern and south-western corners.

The core of the superstructure was of mud brick with no internal walls; possibly a weight saving measure considering how close the pyramid was to the Nile River. The pyramid was, however, built on clay that was incapable of supporting its weight and it began to sink, just as the Bent Pyramid of Sneferu at Dashur had done centuries before. The two pyramids are approximately 1.5 kilometres (0.93 mi) apart.

The outer cladding of limestone "veneer" was held together with dovetail pegs, following the style of his father's tomb. The finished dimensions were approximately 200 cubits per side and 150 cubits high.

==== Pyramidion ====
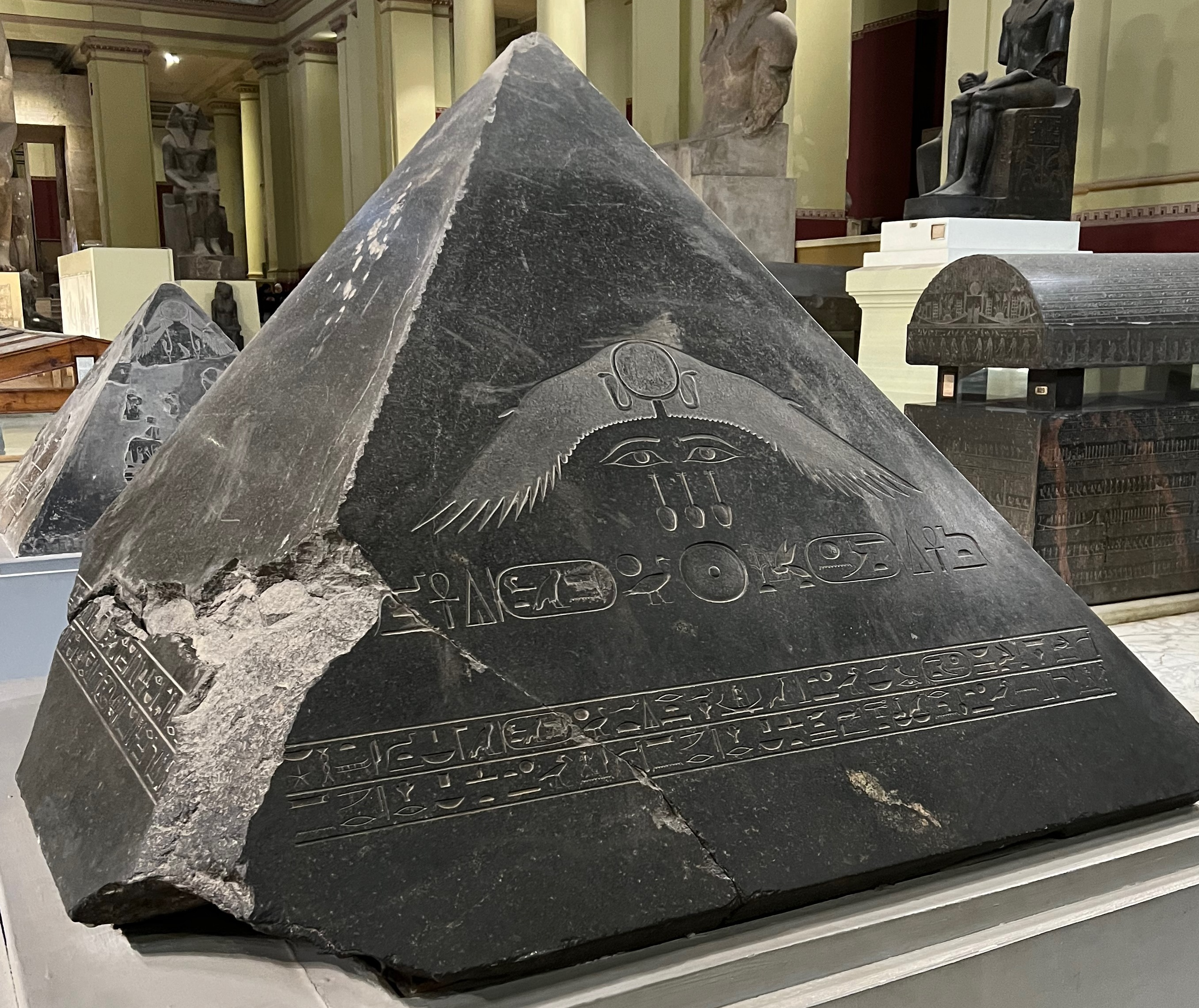
Pyramidion (capstone) at Egyptian Museum, Cairo

The pyramidion (capstone) was covered with inscriptions and religious symbols. Some of these were later scratched off, leading researchers to conclude the pyramidion was either never used or was defaced during Akhenaten's rule.

=== Substructure ===
Below ground level in the subterranean structure lay a network of complicated passages. The "King's section" remains mostly intact with a sarcophagus and canopic jar; however, the king was not buried there. The "Queen's section" was broken into by robbers and looted. There are four other burial chambers in the subterranean structure; to whom they belong, however, is unknown. Two are thought to belong to King Amenemhet IV and queen Sobekneferu.

As the pyramid sank, it began to crush the chambers located beneath it. The builders tried hastily installing supporting beams and mud brick walls to stop the sinking, but this final effort was unsuccessful and the pyramid was ultimately abandoned. The "King's section" contained a burial chamber with a large sarcophagus that was carved to imitate the outer wall of Djoser's Pyramid complex at Saqqara, possibly another attempt to reinforce the legitimacy of his rule.

Burial chambers for two of his queens were created beneath the pyramid; the first chamber of the "Queen's section" under the south-western quadrant of the pyramid was for Queen Aat and the second chamber was for an unnamed queen. Although both chambers had been entered and looted in antiquity, archaeologists found many items overlooked by the looters, including one of Queen Aat's canopic jars.

Queen Aat's chamber contained a sarcophagus similar to the king's. The causeway was unusually wide with a large open area. There were houses on the northern side of the causeway that have been identified as priest's houses.

By the 13th Dynasty, a lack of security led to local inhabitants using the Valley Temple as a granary and the pyramid being looted for the first time. There is evidence of restoration work perhaps 100 years later, when King Auibre Hor and his princess Nubhetepti-khered were buried in two of the 10 shaft tombs on the northern side of the outer enclosure.

== Structural problems ==
The Black Pyramid was constructed with multiple structural deficiencies. The pyramid was built in one of the lowest regions of Egypt, only 10 metres (33 ft) above sea level, which allowed groundwater from the Nile River to seep into the structure. There are many passageways and chambers underground, but not enough stress relievers built into the pyramid above these areas to support the resulting loads. Mud brick was used beneath the surface blocks instead of traditional stone and removal of the limestone casing has allowed the brick to weather and crumble. The poorly supported underground chambers, unsuitable building materials and low site elevation have all led to the sinking and subsequent collapse of the pyramid.

== 21st century looting ==
Rates of looting have increased since the Egyptian Revolution of 2011.

== See also ==
- Construction of the Egyptian pyramids
- List of Egyptian pyramids
- Lepsius list of pyramids
