= Hetepti (king's mother) =

Mother of Amenemhat IV

Hetepti (ḥtp.tj) is a woman holding the title King's Mother and believed to be the mother of king Amenemhat IV, who ruled at the end of the Twelfth Dynasty of the Middle Kingdom in Ancient Egypt.

== Family ==
We know almost nothing about King's Mother Hotepti, except that she may have been the mother of king Amenemhat IV. While holding the title King's Mother, she is not known to hold titles like King's Daughter, King's Sister, or King's Wife, indicating she was part of the royal family. Instead, the title indicate that she came from a non-royal and formed a new branch of the royal line.

The relationship between Amenemhat III and his successor Amenemhat IV, who was born to King's Mother Hotepti, is unclear. Amenemhat III is not known for his sons, but his daughters. Amenemhat IV does not seem to be a first rank son of Amenemhat III, but he may have been a son-in-law which created the title King's Mother for Hotepti when Amenemhat IV was appointed junior coregent in the final year of Amenemhat III.

== Attestation ==
She is only known from a depiction in the temple of Medinet Madi, that was built and decorated under Amenemhat III and his successor Amenemhat IV. There she is simply king's mother, united with the white crown, lady of the two lands and noble lady (iry-pat) in a context where it is clear that she was the mother of Amenemhat IV. The inscription is partly destroyed. It is possible that parts of her titles are missing, but also parts of her name might be destroyed.

Block from Amenemhat III's temple in Medinet Madi mentions: Amenemhat III (nj-mꜣꜥt-rꜥ jmn-m-ḥꜣt), Hotepti (jrjt-pꜥt; mwt-nsw; ẖnmt nfr ḥḏt ḥtp.tj) and Neferuptah (jrjt-pꜥt; sꜣt-nsw nfrw-ptḥ).
