= Khakaureseneb =

Ancient Egyptian mayor

- Nomarch of the 18th nome of Lower Egypt
- Predecessor: Khety (?)
- Successor: Maheshotep (?)
- Dynasty: Twelfth Dynasty
- Pharaoh: Senusret III; Amenemhat III
- Mother: Mut
- Burial: Tell Basta, governoral cemetery?

Khakaureseneb was an ancient Egyptian mayor/Nomarch of Bubastis (Tell Basta) in the Eastern Nile Delta, dating to the late Middle Kingdom.

== Attestation ==
His name Khakaure-seneb can be associated with Khakaure Senusret III during which reign he may have been born, and he may have lived into the reign of Amenemhat III. His chronological positions among the Nomarchs of Bubastis is not clear.

At Tell Basta, a squatting statue of him was found in the governoral palace.

Statue B 96 from the western wall of the so-called throne hall of the palace:

01 | An offering, that the king gives and Re-Harakhty, the son of Geb, Osiris
02 | the Great Ennead, the row of Upper and Lower Egyptian chapels, and Bastet
03 | lady of Bubastis, (that they may give) an invocation offering, (consisting of) bread, beer, pure cattle and fowl, incense, unguent
04 | for the Ka of the hereditary prince, Nomarch, spokesman of Nekheb in the Per-wer, overseer
05 | of the priest(s) of Bastet, Khakaure-seneb, begotten of Mut.
Translation by Lange-Athinodorou 2015:195.

== Tomb ==
At Tell Basta, Khakaure-seneb may have been buried at the "governor's cemetery".

He is not to be confused with Khakaureseneb, mayor of Elephantine.
