= Aat (queen) =

aA t

Queen consort of Egypt
- King: Amenemhat III
- Spouse: Amenemhat III

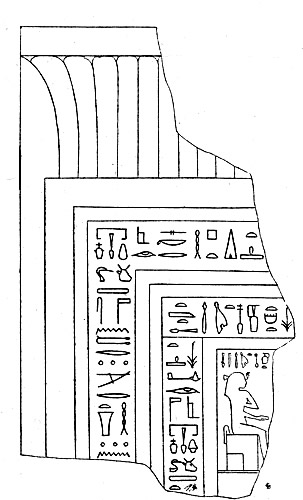
Aat's false door, from Dahshur

Aat ("The Great One") was a queen of the 12th Dynasty of Egypt.

== Tomb ==
Aat was buried at Dahshur, under her husband's pyramid, along with another queen Khenemetneferhedjet III. Her burial chamber is under the south side of the pyramid. The box with the canopic jars was put in a niche above the entrance.

Although the tomb was robbed in antiquity, archaeologists found her sarcophagus, a false door and an offering table along with a few pieces of burial equipment, such as seven alabaster bowls in the form of ducks, two mace heads, pieces of jewelry, and one of the canopic jars. Among the burial items of the other queen buried in the adjoining chamber were obsidian and alabaster bowls, granite and alabaster mace heads and some jewels, along with the pieces of a small stone shrine. Aat was around 35 years old at her death, the other queen was around 25. Their bones were found.

== Titles ==
Aat's titles were: Iry-pat, “King's Wife”, “United with the White Crown”. ꜥꜣt on Persons and Names

== Family ==
She was one of the many wives of Amenemhat lll. She may have been the mother of Sobekneferu.
