= Kheti (vizier) =

Vizier of ancient Egypt

- Vizier of Egypt
- Dynasty: 12th dynasty
- Pharaoh: Amenemhet III

Kheti was an ancient Egyptian vizier of the Twelfth Dynasty under king Amenemhet III, who ruled around 1800 BC.

Kheti is known from a papyrus fragment dated to the 29th year of the reign of that monarch. He is the only vizier who can be specifically dated to the rule of Amenemhat III.

In the Installation of the Vizier, a text referring to the office of the vizier, found in several New Kingdom tombs, there is mentioned a famous vizier named Kheti. About him it is said: "He impoverished his associates for the benefits of others". It seems possible that both sources refer to the same person.
