= Neferuptah =

< p t H nfr nfr nfr >
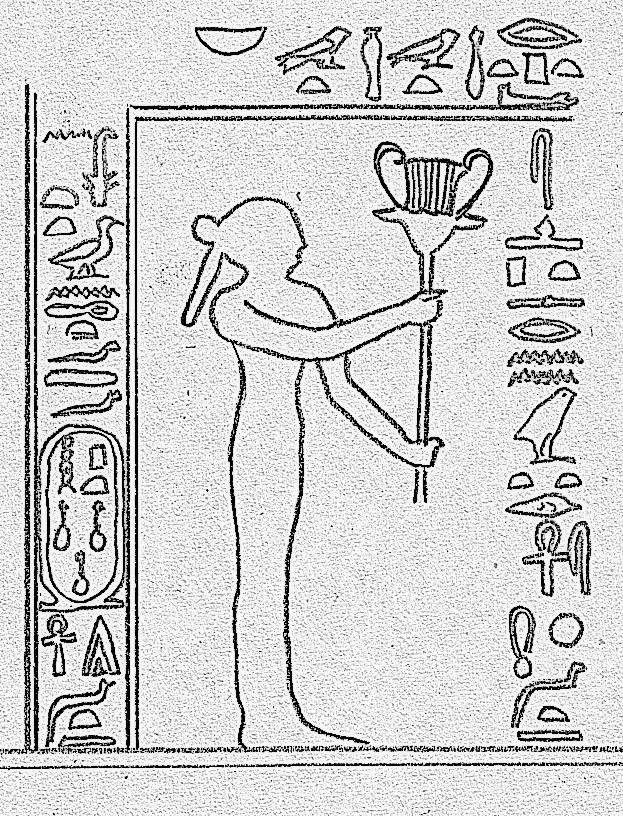
- Burial place: Faiyum, Egypt
- Father: Amenemhat III

Neferuptah or Ptahneferu (“Beauty of Ptah”) was a daughter of the Egyptian king Amenemhat III of the 12th Dynasty. Her sister was the female Pharaoh Sobekneferu (“Beauty of Sobek”).

== Biography ==
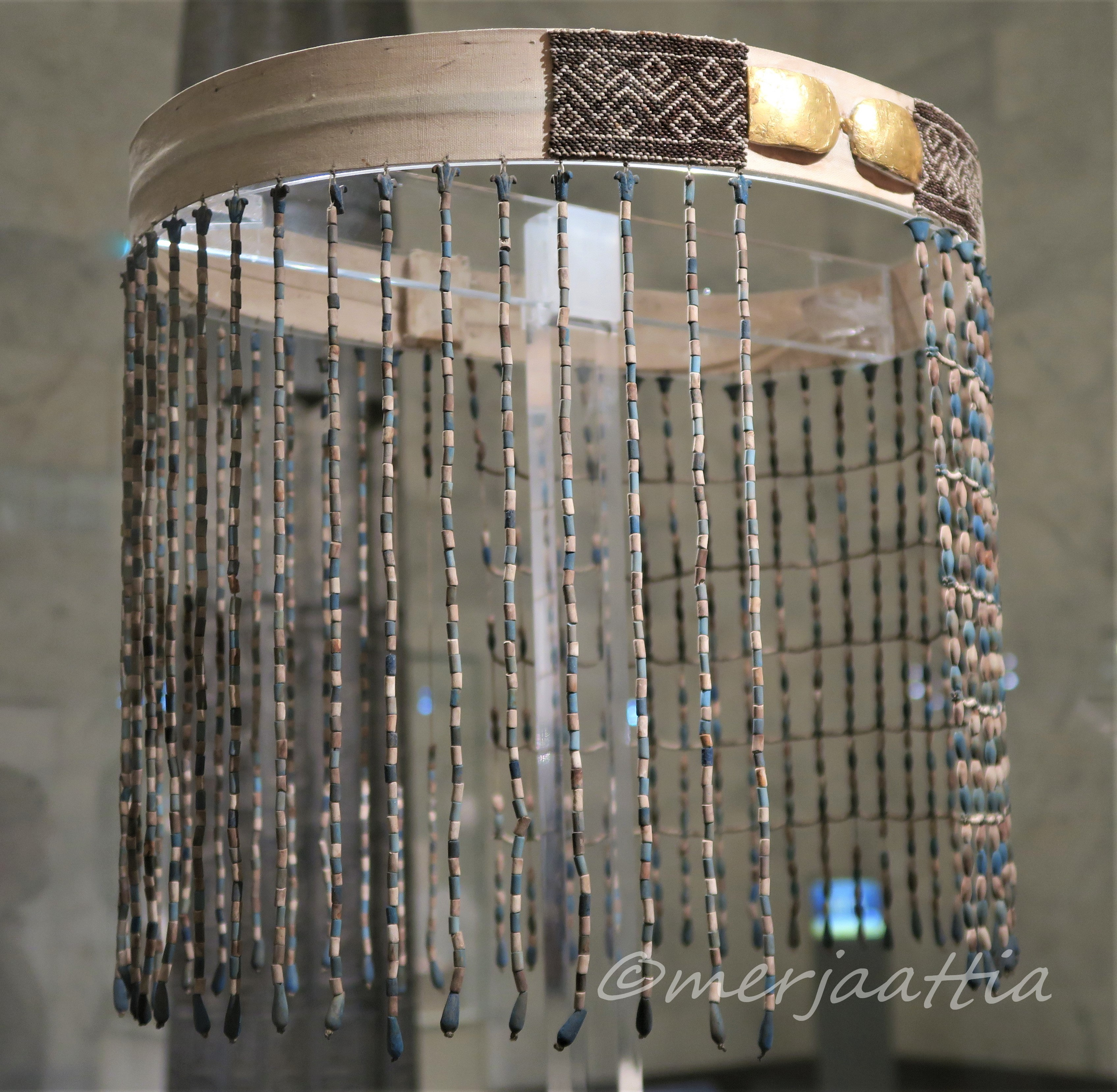
The Funerary apron of Neferuptah

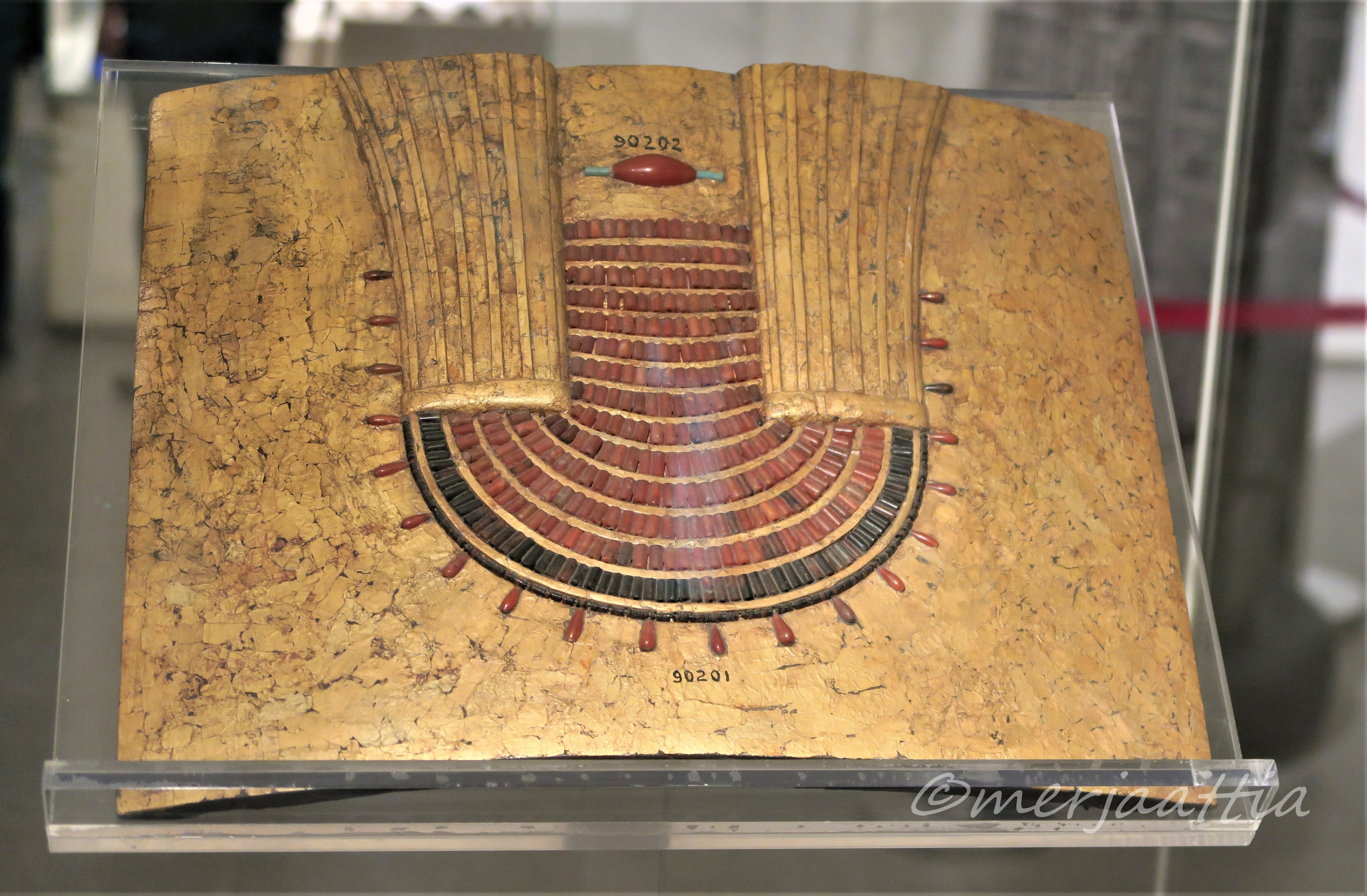
An exquisite pectoral of Neferuptah

Neferuptah was one of the first royal women whose name was written inside a cartouche. Although she never had the title 'king's wife', she must have had a special status; it is possible she was regarded as a future ruler.

Her titles included member of the elite, great of favour, great of praise, and beloved king's daughter of his body.

A burial for her was prepared in the tomb of her father at Hawara. However, she was not buried there, but in a small pyramid at Hawara. Her tomb was found intact by an Egyptian team under Nagib Farag and Zaky Iskander in 1956 which was located about 2 kilometres from the pyramid of her father and still contained her jewellery, a granite sarcophagus, three silver vases, and other objects.

The granite sarcophagus was inscribed with a short offering formula. Inside the sarcophagus were found the decayed remains of two wooden coffins. The outer one was decorated with inscribed gold foil. Identical inscriptions were found on the sarcophagus of Queen Hatshepsut, who lived about 300 years later. Her tomb is mentioned on a papyrus found at Lahun. She is depicted next to her father in the temple at Medinet Madi. Objects belonging to her include a sphinx of black granite and the fragment of a statue found on Elephantine.

In an important 2017 paper titled "The two burials of Neferuptah and other second burials for royal women" in Cahiers Caribéens d’Egyptologie 22 (2017), the German Egyptologist Wolfram Grajetzki notes that Princess Neferuptah was actually provided with two separate burials. Grajetzki wrote that Neferuptah's earlier burial was previously already known from the 19th century with the discovery of the:

"....burial of a ‘king’s daughter’ Neferuptah [which] had already been identified at the pyramid of king Amenemhat III at Hawara, where objects with the name of Neferuptah were found in the burial chamber. These objects are an alabaster offering table inscribed for her, and fragments of perhaps eight duck dishes also inscribed with her name. On these, her only title is ‘king’s daughter’, and her name is written without a cartouche.

Grajetzki surmises that Nefeuptah likely had "two burials, one in the pyramid of her father and another about two kilometres apart [from Amenemhat III's pyramid]"--with the first burial being a dummy burial. This explains why the 1956 discovery of Neferuptah's intact tomb 2 kilometres from her father's pyramid:

"contained an impressive array of objects including personal adornments. Neferuptah appears in this tomb with a series of different titles. On a big offering table, she is simply called ‘king’s daughter’. On her sarcophagus she is ‘member of the elite, great one of the hetes-sceptre, great of honour, beloved king’s daughter of his body’ (iryt-pat, wrt Hts, wrt Hzwt, zAt-niswt nt Xt.f mrt.f). Her name is written in a cartouche. On her middle coffin, only preserved in small fragments of gold foil, her sole title is ‘king’s daughter’. Here, her name is not written in a cartouche. Finally, her name is found on three silver vessels, where she is called ‘member of the elite, king’s daughter’ and ‘king’s daughter of the body’, and here her name is written within a cartouche. In the offering formula on these vessels, appears the throne name of king Amenemhat III, Nimaatre.

== Attestations ==
Granite Sphinx, Cairo TN 13.12.24.4 Hereditary Princess, King's Daughter {jrjt-pꜥt; sꜣt-nsw nfrw-ptḥ}

Relief, Amenemhat III temple in Medinet Madi Mentions Amenemhat III {nj-mꜣꜥt-rꜥ jmn-m-ḥꜣt}, Hotepti {jrjt-pꜥt; mwt-nsw; ẖnmt nfr ḥḏt ḥtp.tj} and Neferuptah {jrjt-pꜥt; sꜣt-nsw nfrw-ptḥ}.

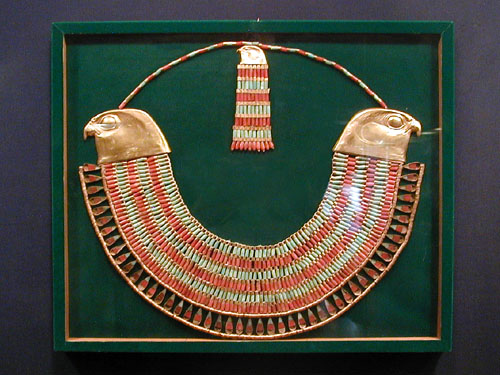
A broad collar of Neferuptah

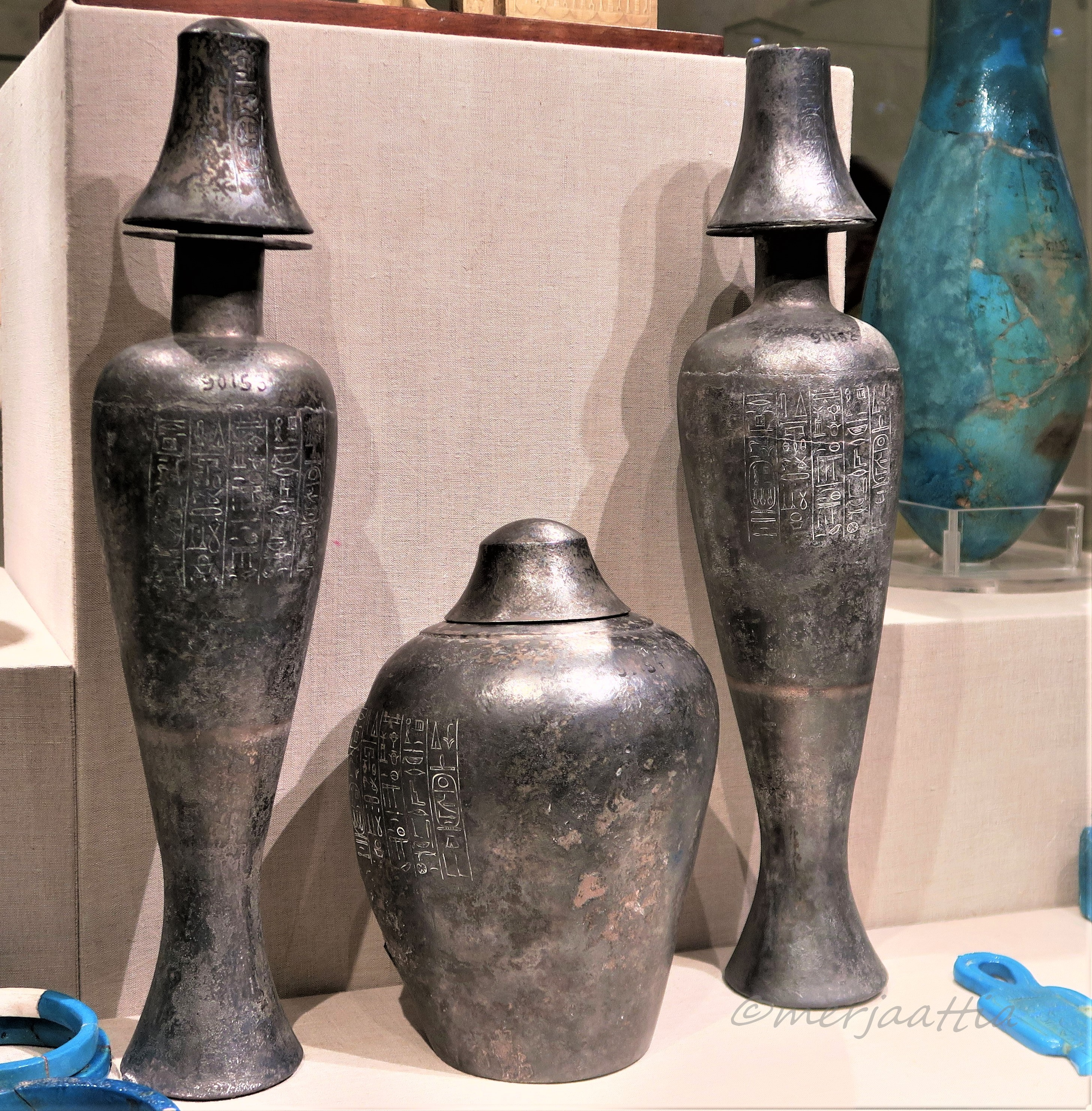
Silver vases of Neferuptah
