= Satsobek =

Ancient Egyptian queen consort

zA sbk
Satsobek
in hieroglyphs
Era: 2nd Intermediate Period
(1650–1550 BC)

Satsobek (also Sitsobek or Zatsobek; Daughter of Sobek) was an ancient Egyptian queen with the titles Great Royal Wife and the one united with the white crown. She is so far only known from one scarab seal in a private collection. The scarab is datable on stylistical grounds to the Thirteenth Dynasty. Her husband remains unknown. Her name is written Sasobek, without the female t ending in Sat (daughter). This might be a simple mistake or short writing, but it is also possible that she used a male name Sasobek - (Son of Sobek). Male names for women are common in this period.
