= Nubhetepti =

Egyptian queen

nbw N33A Htp ti i
Nubhetepti
in hieroglyphs
Era: Middle Kingdom
(2055–1650 BC)

Nubhetepti (nb-ḥtp.tỉ, "Gold [=Hathor] is satisfied") was an ancient Egyptian queen during the early 13th dynasty in the late Middle Kingdom.

== Family ==
Her husband is unknown. However, king Hor had a daughter called Nubhetepti-khered. This translates as Nubhetepti-the-child and indicates that there was another (older) Nubhetepti around at the same time. For that reason it has been argued that Nubhetepti was the wife of king Hor and perhaps the mother of the princess Nubhetepti-khered.

Ryholt (1997:218) divides scarabs with titles belonging Queen Nubhotepti into Type A (King's Wife, King's Mother) and Type B (Great King Wife, She who is united with the White Crown). The scarabs of Type A, seems to be in use prior to the scarabs of Type B. The question is if there is only one Queen Nubhotepti, or two queens Nubhotepti A and Nubhotepti B. In addition there is the king's daughter Nubhotepti-Khered (Nubhotepti-the child/minor). It has been suggested that king Hor was married to a queen Nubhotepti, and that Nubhotepti-Khered may have been his daughter.

== Attestations ==
She is also known from a statuette found at Semna.

=== Scarabs Type A: King's Wife, King's Mother ===
- Boston 24.2079 | At Kumma, a statue of woman standing/striding (119 mm) belonging to King's Wife and King's Mother, Nubhotepti (cartouche).

She is mainly known from scarab seals, which are datable by style to the 13th Dynasty. They refer to the King's Wife and King's Mother.

=== Scarabs Type B: Great Royal Wife, United with the White Crown ===
- Drouot, 10.11.1990, no. 152 | At statue base with the name of Great King's Wife and United with the White Crown, Nubhotepti.

There are other scarabs of a queen Nubhetepti with the titles Great Royal Wife and she united with the white crown. These scarabs belong perhaps to another queen with the same name.
