= Khenemetneferhedjet III =

Ancient Egyptian queen consort

Queen consort of Egypt
- King: Amenemhat III
- Spouse: Amenemhat III

Khenemetneferhedjet III was an Egyptian queen. She was the wife of the Twelfth Dynasty ruler Amenemhet III and was buried in his pyramid at Dahshur. Her name is so far only known from one object, an alabaster vessel found in her burial. She had the titles king's wife, member of the elite and mistress of the two countries. She was buried in a decorated, but uninscribed sarcophagus.

Her burial was found looted and only few remains were found. Dieter Arnold, who found her burial, originally interpreted her name as the queen's title Khenemetneferhedjet and believed that the ritual vessel from her tomb did not bear any proper name. However, more recent researchers draw attention to the fact that it is not common just to give the title of an individual and not the proper name, especially on rituals objects in a tomb chamber. Therefore, Khenemetneferhedjet is most likely the proper name of this queen.
