= Claude Obsomer =

Belgian Egyptologist

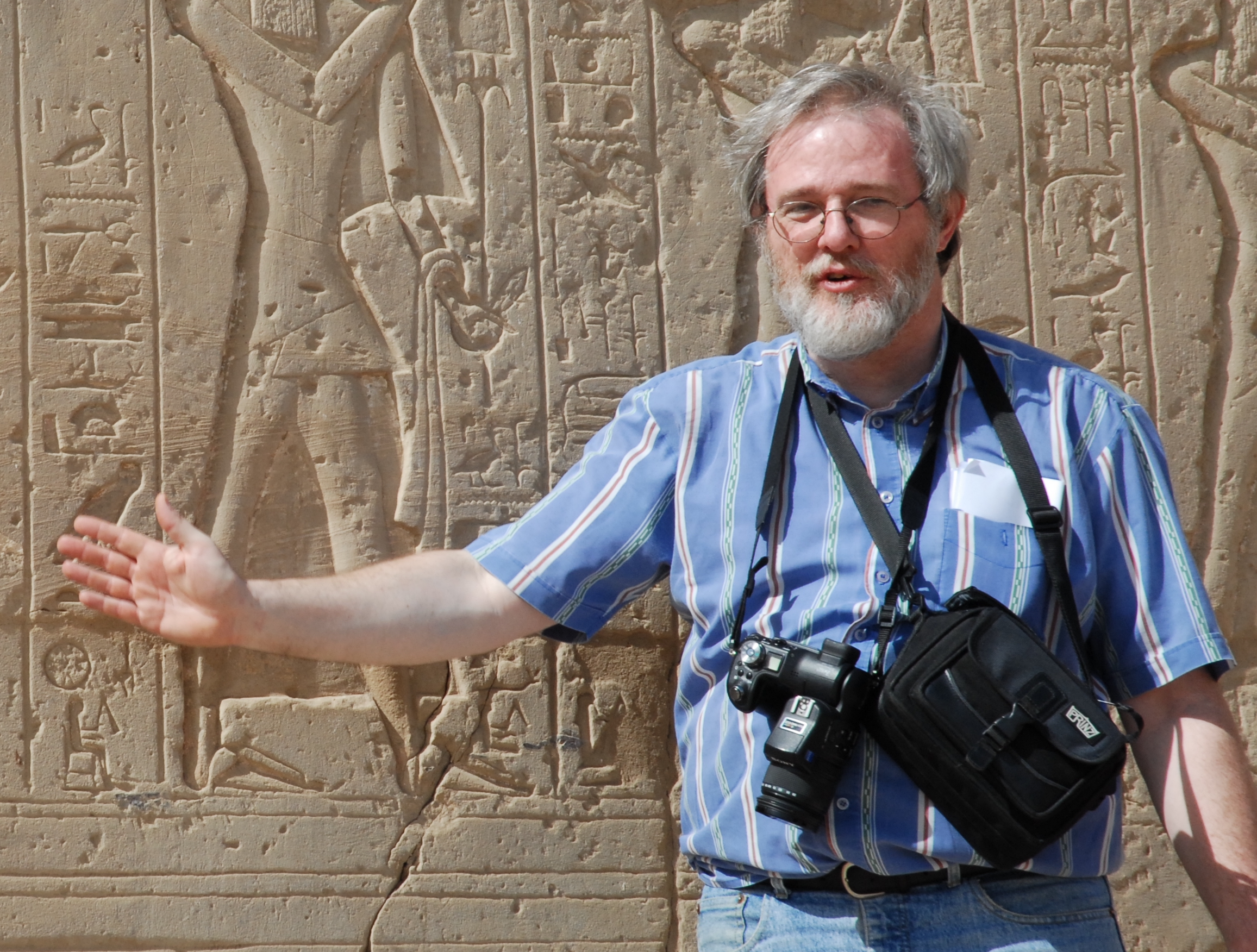
- Obsomer in 2007
- Born: 3 February 1963 (age 63); Tournai, Belgium

Academic work
- Discipline: Egyptology
- Institutions: Catholic University of Louvain; University of Notre Dame
- Notable works: Égyptien hiéroglyphique

Claude Obsomer (born 3 February 1963), is a Belgian Egyptologist and professor at the Catholic University of Louvain and the University of Notre Dame.

== Life ==
Obsomer was born on 3 February 1963 in Tournai.

=== Academic work ===
In 1995, Obsomer became a full professor at the Catholic University of Louvain.

== Award ==
- 2008, Wernaers Award, for his DVD-ROM: Égyptien hiéroglyphique. Méthode interactive d'apprentissage, published by Safran (éditions). This prize was awarded to the author for his research and dissemination of knowledge.

== Bibliography ==
=== Books ===
- Obsomer, Claude (2005). Sésostris Ier. : Étude chronologique et historique du règne (CD-Rom). ISBN 2-9600469-4-3.
- Obsomer, Claude (1989). Les campagnes de Sésostris dans Hérodote. Connaissance de l'Egypte ancienne. Vol. 1. Safran.
- Obsomer, Claude (2012). Ramsès II. Les grands pharaons. Pygmalion.
- Obsomer, Claude (2012). Égyptien hiéroglyphique (PDF). Langues et cultures anciennes. Vol. 11. ISBN 978-2-87457-096-4.

=== Articles ===
- Obsomer, Claude (1999). "Sinouhé l'Égyptien et les raisons de son exil". Le Muséon. 112 (3–4): 207–271. doi:10.2143/MUS.112.3.519477.
- Obsomer, Claude. Hérodote et les prêtres de Memphis (PDF). Orientalia Lovaniensia Analecta. Vol. 85. pp. 1423–1442.
