= Khenemetneferhedjet =

Xnm nfr S1
Khenemetneferhedjet
in hieroglyphs
Era: Middle Kingdom
(2055–1650 BC)

Khenemetneferhedjet (ẖnm.t nfr-ḥḏ.t) was an ancient Egyptian queenly title during the Middle Kingdom. It was in use from the 12th to the early 18th Dynasty. During the 12th Dynasty it also occurred as a personal name. Its meaning is "united with the white crown". The White Crown was one part of the Double Crown of Egypt and is usually interpreted to have represented Upper Egypt, but it is also possible that while the Red Crown represented the king's earthly incarnation, the White Crown represented the eternal, godlike aspect of kingship.

After the title of the Great Royal Wife was created, this title was phased out and not issued again, and queens who had been given the Khenemetneferhedjet title were retroactively recognized as Great Royal Wife by later dynasties.

== Famous bearers ==
As a name

- Khenemetneferhedjet I, a wife of Senusret II
- Khenemetneferhedjet II, a wife of Senusret III
- Khenemetneferhedjet III, a wife of Amenemhet III
- Khenemetneferhedjet, daughter of Amenemhat II, mentioned on a seal along with her father; conceivably identical with Khenemetneferhedjet I.

As a title

- 12th Dynasty: Aat, Hetepti (mother of Amenemhat IV), Khenemet and Itaweret (daughters of Amenemhat II, possible wives of Senusret II), Neferthenut (wife of Senusret III), unknown lady (daughter of Senusret II, wife of Senusret III).
- 13th Dynasty: Ineni (wife of Ay), Nubhetepti (wife of Hor), Nubkhaes (wife of Sobekhotep V or Sobekhotep VI), Senebhenas (wife of Sobekhotep III), Satsobek (husband unknown).
- 16th Dynasty: Mentuhotep (wife of Djehuti), Sobekemsaf (wife of Sekhemre-Wepmaat Intef).
- 18th Dynasty: Pharaoh Hatshepsut and an unknown lady.
