= Wolfram Grajetzki =

German Egyptologist (born 1960)

Wolfram Grajetzki (born 1960, in Berlin) is a German Egyptologist. He studied at Free University of Berlin and made his PhD at the Humboldt University of Berlin. He performed excavations in Egypt, but also in Pakistan. He published articles and several books on the Egyptian Middle Kingdom, on administration, burial customs and queens. He is also a researcher at the Centre for Advanced Spatial Analysis, University College London, United Kingdom, working on the project 'Digital Egypt for Universities'.

== Works ==
- The Second Intermediate Period model coffin of Teti in the British Museum (EA 35016) PDF, British Museum Studies in Ancient Egypt and Sudan (BMSEAS) 5 (2005), pp.1-16
- Two Treasurers of the Late Middle Kingdom (British Archaeological Report S1007) Oxford, 2001 ISSN 0143-3067
- Burial Customs in Ancient Egypt: Life in Death for Rich and Poor Duckworth Egyptology, London 2003 ISBN 978-0715632178
- Ancient Egyptian Queens: A hieroglyphic Dictionary, Golden House Publications, London 2005, ISBN 978-0954721893
- The Middle Kingdom of Ancient Egypt: History, Archaeology and Society, Duckworth Egyptology, London 2006, ISBN 978-0715634356 (Spanish translationː El Reino Medio del Antiguo Egipto: Historia, arqueología y Sociedad (DICIONES RIALP S.A.), ISBN 9788432170201
- Court Officials of the Egyptian Middle Kingdom, Duckworth Egyptology, London 2006, ISBN 978-0715637456 (Italian translationː Dignitari di corte del Medio Regno, 2020 ISBN 979-1280007148)
- The People of the Cobra Province in Egypt: A Local History, 4500 to 1500 BC, Oxbow Books, Oxford 2020, ISBN 978-1789254211
- The two burials of Neferuptah and other second burials for royal women' Cahiers Caribéens d’Egyptologie 22 (2017), pp.33-42 PDF
