= Pyramid of Senusret III =

Ancient Egyptian pyramid

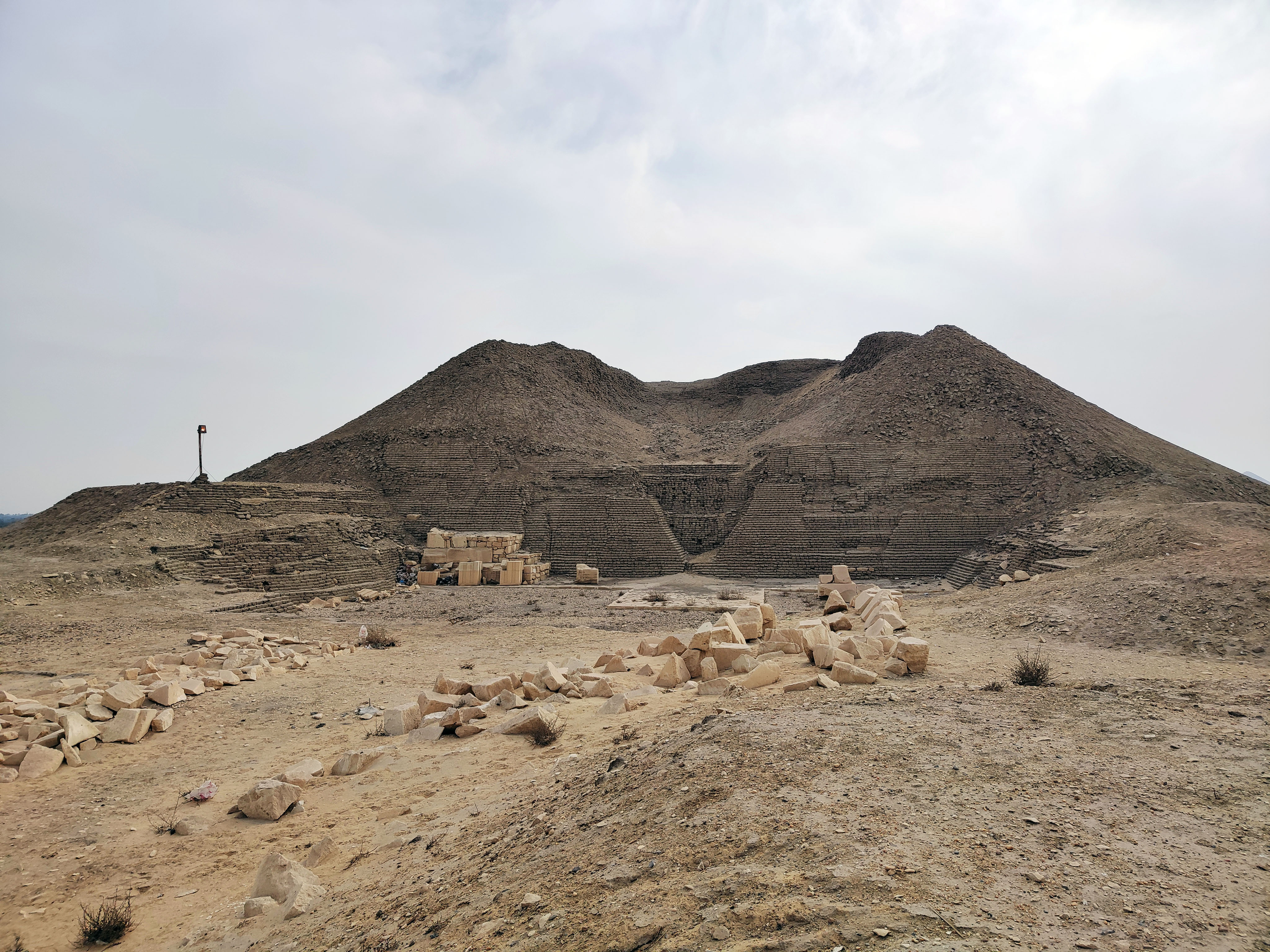
- The pyramid in 2022
- Interactive map of Pyramid of Senusret III
- 29°49′8″N 31°13′32″E
- Owner: Senusret III
Ancient name
< F12 S29 D21 X1 O34 N35 > W15 O24
Qbḥ Sn-wsr-t
Qebeh Sen-user-et
"Senusret is cool" or "cool place of Senusret"
- Constructed: Twelfth Dynasty
- Type: True pyramid (now ruined)
- Material: Mudbrick (core); Tura limestone (casing)
- Height: 78 m (256 ft)
- Base: 105 m (344 ft)
- Volume: 288,488 m^{3} (10,187,900 cu ft)
- Slope: 56° 18' 35"

The pyramid of Senusret III (Lepsius XLVII) is an ancient Egyptian pyramid located at Dahshur and built for pharaoh Senusret III of the 12th Dynasty.

The pyramid is the northernmost among those of Dahshur, and stands around 1.5 km northeast of Sneferu's Red Pyramid. It was erected on leveled ground and composed of a mudbricks core covered with a casing of white Tura limestone blocks resting on foundations. It was first excavated in 1894 by the French Egyptologist Jacques de Morgan, who managed to reach the burial chamber after discovering a tunnel dug by ancient tomb robbers. A more recent campaign was led by Dieter Arnold during the 1990s.

Adela Oppenheim identified solar themes in the pyramid temple, south temple, and causeway, including references to the gods of Heliopolis, Ra as Senusret III's divine father, seasonal scenes, and sed festival imagery (jubilee) associated with the renewal of kingship. The location of Senusret III's burial has been debated. Even though the chambers found at Dahshur contained a red granite sarcophagus that belonged to the king, Arnold is not sure whether it ever held the king's body/burial was conducted there. Miroslav Verner reports Josef Wegner's proposal that Senusret III was buried in this underground tomb at Abydos rather than beneath the Dahshur pyramid. The complex has until now been thought to be a royal cenotaph as the king's sarcophagus was partly open and without the king's remains, however this hypothesis remains unproven.

== Pyramid complex ==
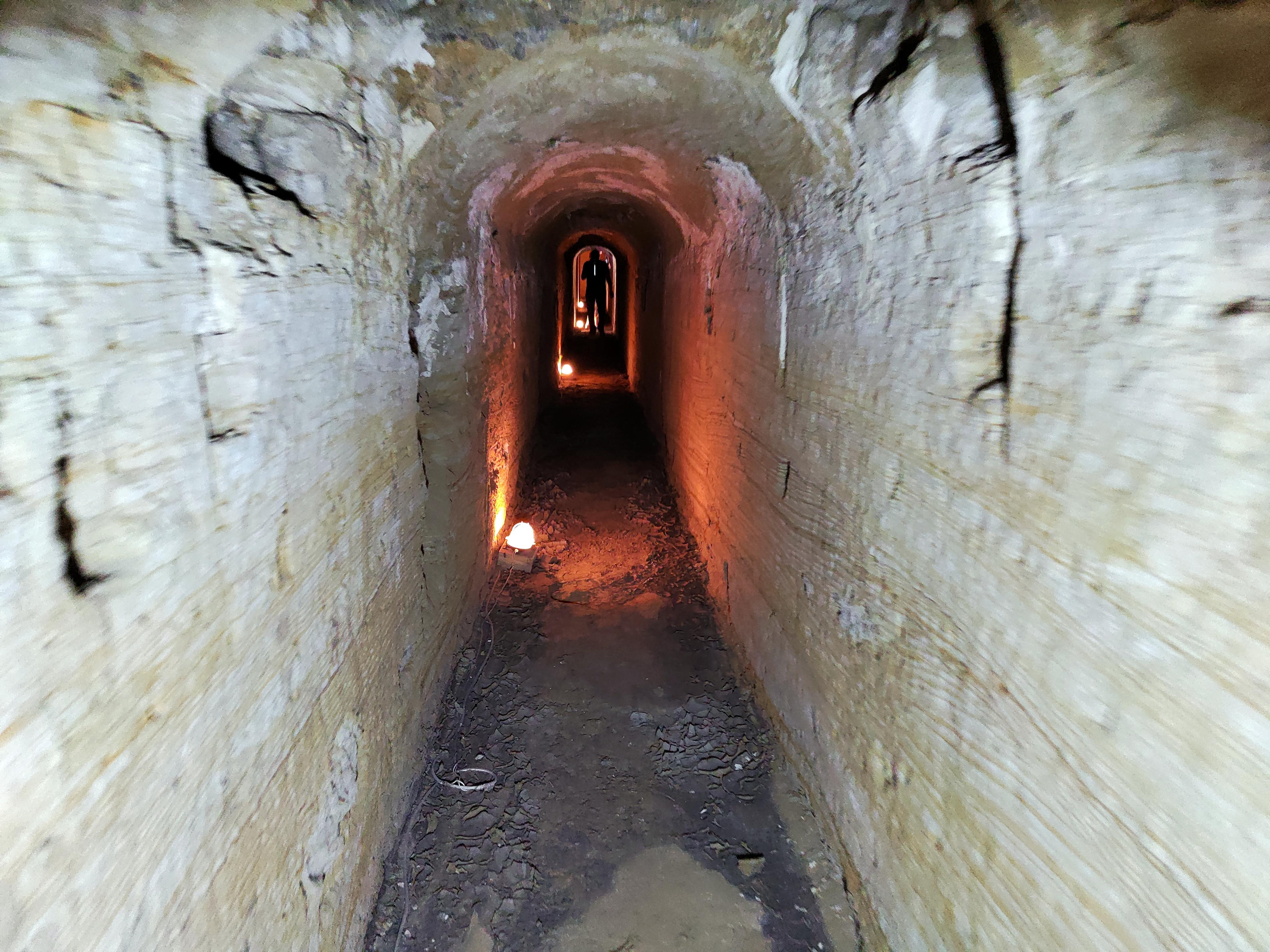
A pyramid corridor of Senusret III's tomb

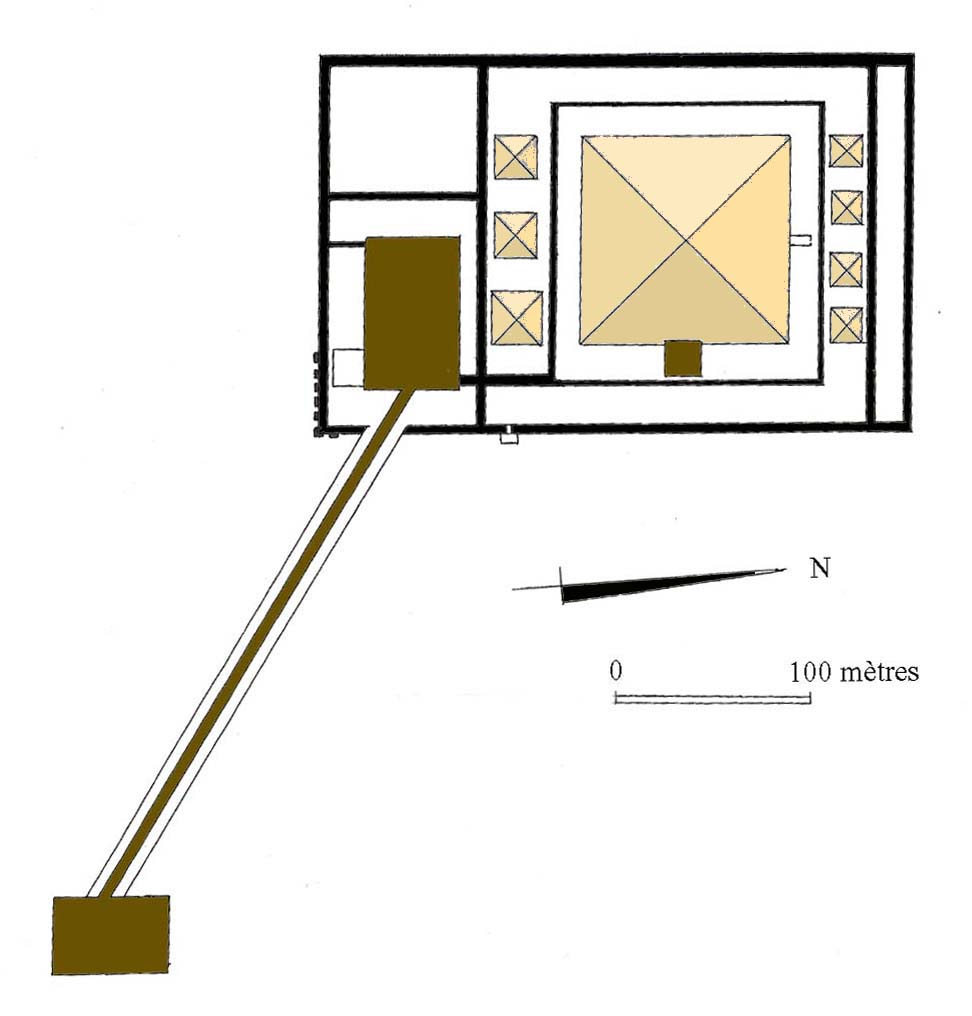
Map of the complex

The original project included the main pyramid along with a northern chapel and a small eastern mortuary temple, all surrounded by an enclosure wall. Outside this enclosure were seven tombs belonging to Senusret's queens and princesses, and the whole complex was again surrounded by an outer wall; this wall was enlarged during the works in order to accommodate a large temple on the southern side and a causeway. The remains of six sacred barques were excavated outside the outer enclosure on the southern side.

The now-demolished eastern temple was very small in size, perhaps a sign of the decline of the traditional funerary cult, as Arnold suggested. On the remaining reliefs were depicted conventional scenes of offerings to the enthroned Senusret III. The southern temple was likely demolished during the New Kingdom and according to its foundations it consisted in a colonnaded courtyard and an inner shrine. The valley temple has not been discovered.

Many shaft tombs belonged to the royal women were discovered on the northern and southern sides of the main pyramid; it was believed that these shafts were topped by mastabas until Arnold in 1997 demonstrated that these consisted in the intricated rock-cut hypogea of seven small pyramids. Explorations of the northern tombs led to the discovery of the treasures of princesses Sithathor and Mereret (among these objects, the famous pectorals with the names of Senusret II, Senusret III and Amenemhat III now exhibited at the Cairo Museum), as well as the sarcophagi of princesses Menet and Senetsenebtysy and of queen Neferthenut. Among the southern tombs, the easternmost was discovered in 1994 and its hypogeum led to a burial chamber located under the main pyramid. Here, a granite sarcophagus was found, along with some objects bearing the name of Khenemetneferhedjet I Weret, Senusret III's royal mother.

== Hypogeum ==
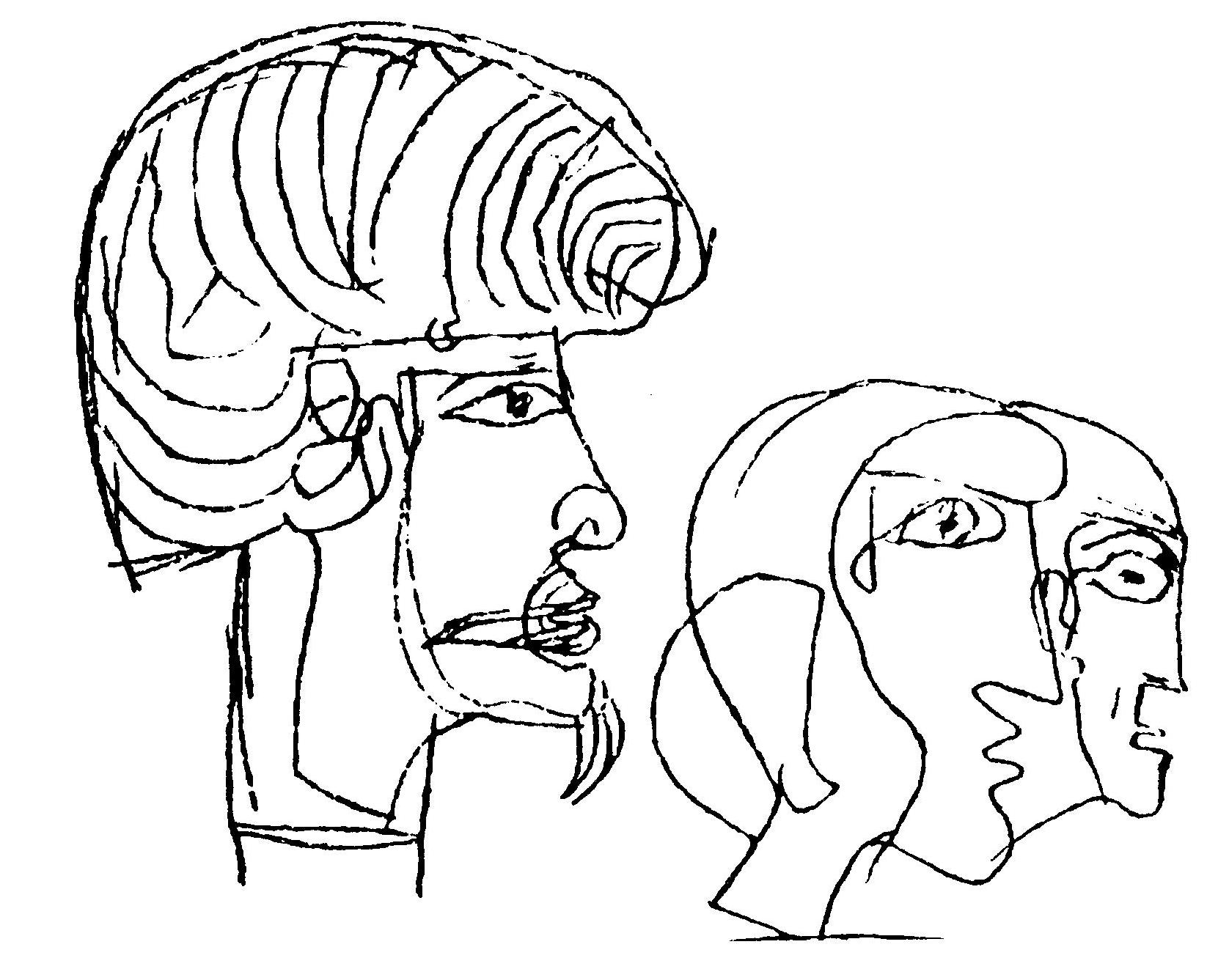
Graffito of the striking-haired digger

De Morgan struggled for months to find the original entrance; after digging several tunnels directed towards the center of the monument, he finally found the thieves' tunnel. One of the passages was covered by graffiti which were rather alien to the Egyptian canons, the most famous among these represents a human head with a striking hairstyle. De Morgan argued that the tunnels and the graffiti were made by Semitic grave robbers during the Hyksos occupation. From the thieves' tunnels, de Morgan was able to trace the original entrance.

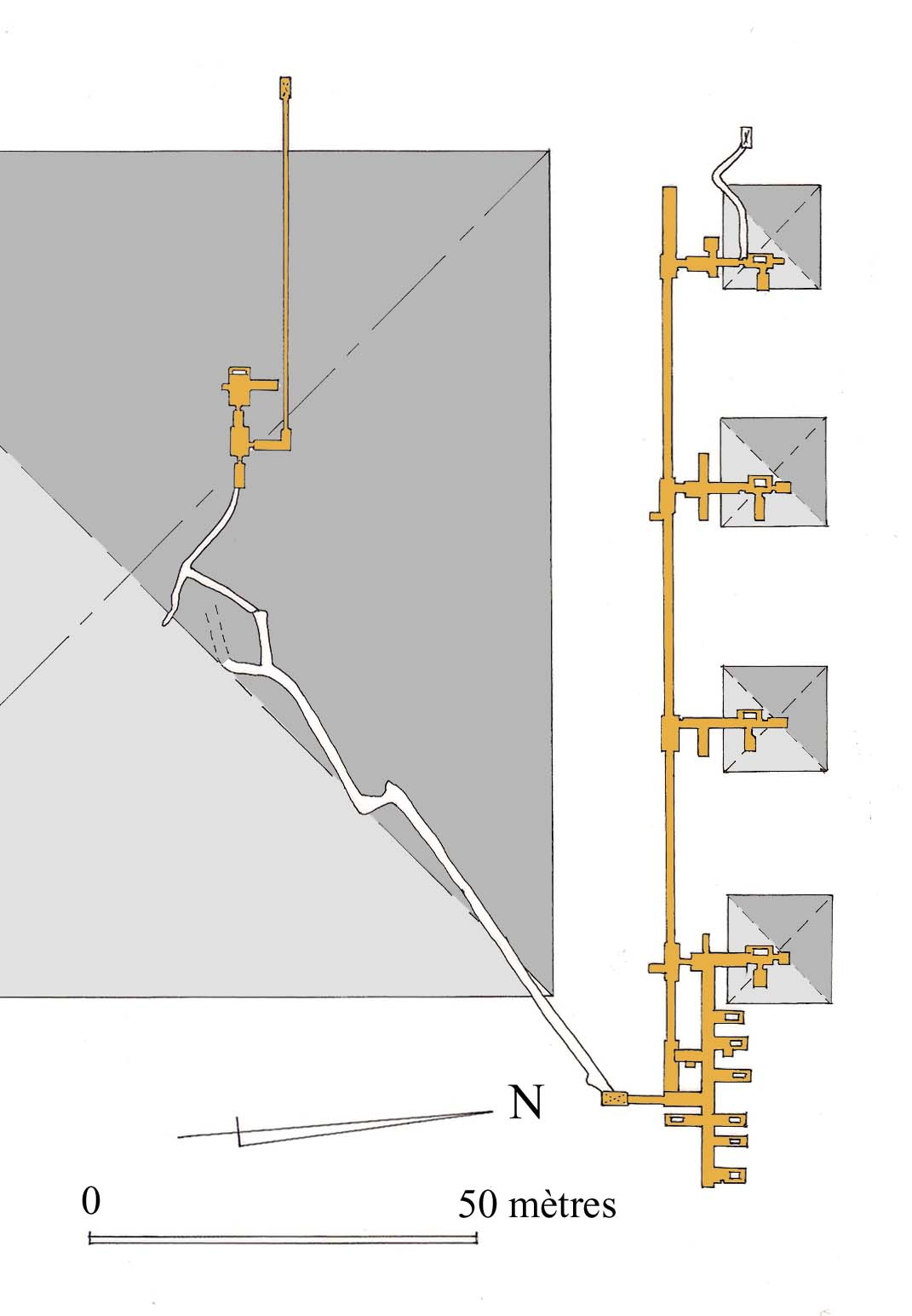
Hypogea of the main pyramid (left) and of the four northern small pyramids (right)

From the entrance, located on the western side of the pyramid, a long descending hallway led to an antechamber which connects a storeroom on the west wall to the king's chamber on the east wall, the latter made from granite and provided with a granite sarcophagus on the western side, and a niche for the canopic chest on the southern one. The granite walls of the burial chamber were whiten with gypsum. Above the chamber Arnold found three relieving vaults made from granite (the bottom one), limestone (the middle one) and mudbricks (the top one) which were meant to discharge the weight on the underlying chamber's walls in order to prevent a roof collapse. The king's chamber contained pottery and a dagger, while the granite sarcophagus was empty. It is possible that Senusret III was never buried there and that he might have preferred his Abydene tomb as his final resting place, as suggested by the lack of a blocking system within this hypogeum.

== Excavation history ==
John Shae Perring was the first to excavate Senusret III's pyramid complex at Dahshur in 1839. In searching for the entrance of the pyramid, Perring removed debris from the area in front of the center of the north side, having no success he assumed that the entrance may be further north of the pyramid court, Perring dug a large trench north of the pyramid, without no result but he did discovered several blocks with inscriptions bearing hieroglyphics relief and two fragments decorated with stars on a blue ground that formed part of the ceiling in the eastern side. Karl Richard Lepsius was the second person to visit the king's pyramid in 1843 and recorded his findings of the location of the causeway and surviving walls in the northern side.

These investigations continued in Jacques de Morgan's excavations. De Morgan conducted extensive excavations in 1894-1895. His team found a secondary (subsidiary) shaft leading to the queen's gallery in 1894. On April 15 of that same year, his workers began tunneling beneath the pyramid's base in search of the king's burial chamber or king's hypogeum. Work was interrupted on June 15, and the royal burial chamber was discovered during the second season in November 1894. De Morgan also found graffiti on the walls of the serdab, a small adjoining room in the antechamber. The drawings mainly showed male profiles, although their date and the artists who drew them remain unidentified.

De Morgan would come to discover broken limestone casing material covering the original entrance shaft in the western courtyard. De Morgan also mentions that there were no surviving remains of brick or stone blocking the entrance. In 1894, de Morgan also dug a large east-west trench near the center of the east side of the pyramid. De Morgan uncovered remains of the pyramid temple, where he found some relief fragments . In the underground tomb in Princess Itakayet's pyramid, he reported finding a blocked canopic shrine containing an unopened red granite chest and the chest held two ordinary alabaster canopic jars and two unusual oval containers with human-headed lids.

De Morgan would come to discover broken limestone casing material covering the original entrance shaft in the western courtyard. De Morgan also mentions that there were no surviving remains of brick or stone blocking the entrance. In 1894, de Morgan also dug a large east-west trench near the center of the east side of the pyramid. De Morgan uncovered remains of the pyramid temple, where he found some relief fragments . In the underground tomb in Princess Itakayet's pyramid, he reported finding a blocked canopic shrine containing an unopened red granite chest and the chest held two ordinary alabaster canopic jars and two unusual oval containers with human-headed lids.

The Metropolitan Museum of Art continued the fieldwork in 1990 with Arnold as the director of the excavation assisted by Oppenheim. The first season consisted of reopening and documenting the king's underground chambers and the queen gallery. The Arnold expedition also discovered the upper causeway, the southeastern enclosure, and outer walls. In 1992, work expanded to the lower causeway, the south temple area, and the eastern pyramid temple.

In 1993 Arnold and his team recovered 2,500 relief fragments from the pyramid temple and south temple. He later discovered/ investigated the subsidiary pyramids and their chapels. The eastern chapel of Princess Itakayet's pyramid was discovered in 1996, and other royal women chapels in 1997. Later work in 1999 further exposed the main pyramid's foundations (dimensions, and other) and the brick core. Arnold then concluded his publications in his book " The Pyramid Complex of Senwosret III at Dahshur" in 2002, with contributions to Oppenheim and Allen, while Arnold did mention that further investigations of the complex still need to be looked at and investigated. Later excavation of the south temple resumed and was continued in 2017 and later on Oppenheim discovered granodiorite statue fragments in 2019, representing Senusret III in a knee-length sed festival ( cloak with crook and flail). This evidence concluded that solar cult (beliefs)/ imagery was a significant part of the complex's religious meaning.

== Underground chambers and sarcophagus ==
=== Entrance shaft and neighboring rooms ===
photo taken in 2022, it shows the limestone wall of the corridor that leads to Senusret III's underground burial chamber (crypt).

The entrance shaft leading to Senusret III's underground royal funerary apartments lies in the courtyard west of his pyramid, about 35 meters south of the northwestern corner. The vertical entrance shaft measures about 1.04 x 2.62 meters wide and descends 11 meters below the ancient courtyard level. Its opening was originally lined up with bricks that deteriorated significantly over time and required reinforcement with a new brick lining. Arnold mentioned that the shaft was too narrow to have been used for the construction transport, which was carried out via other locations. From this shaft, a sloping corridor runs eastward, and the final 10 meters of the corridor are lined up with limestone blocks forming the floor, walls, and ceiling (about 92 cm wide and 1.79 meters high). The lining consists of two courses of wall blocks leading to the underground apartment before turning right (south) toward the antechamber.The antechamber measures 2.34-2.35 x 3.69-3.71 meters, with a curved ceiling about 3.60-3.61 meters high . Three doorways connect to the antechamber: one to the north, Senusret III's burial (crypt) to the west and a serdab measuring 3.00 x 1.57 meters to the east, the purpose of which Arnold mentions remains unclear.

==== Burial chamber and sarcophagus ====
Red granite sarcophagus of Pharaoh Senusret III inside the burial chamber (crypt) at Dahshur, Egypt. Taken in 2022.

The burial chamber of Senusret III was built primarily of red granite, with a sarcophagus placed on the west wall with its head end facing north .The chamber itself measures 2.70 meters wide and 5.24 meters long, with the ceiling height of 3.18-3.19 meters. Additionally, the south wall of the king's burial chamber was blocked by five limestone beams; Arnold pointed out that 4 of the lower beams remained in position, while the fifth beam was missing. The red granite sarcophagus found at Dahshur featured polished flat surfaces, sharply cut edges, and a lower exterior that resembles a paneled enclosure wall. Its lid has a shallow central rise, rectangular ends, and flat ledges along the long sides. Whether Senusret III was actually buried in this tomb at Dahshur or in his tomb at Abydos remains a subject of ongoing debate.

===== Findings, interpretation, and debate about the burial location =====
At Dahshur, De Morgan found no remains of stone or bricks blocking the entrance passage, leading Arnold to suggest that the passage may have never been sealed because the decision was made to bury King Senusret III elsewhere. Furthermore, Arnold's and his team found that the sarcophagus lid was a little open, as De Morgan also mentioned seeing it like that. Because its locking mechanism wasn't working properly, and the interior of the sarcophagus was perfectly clean with no bones, Arnold is not certain if Senusret III's body was buried in the tomb at Dahshur.

Moreover, Verner mentions that Josef Wegner and other Egyptologist and archaeologists such as Mark Lehner, have proposed that the king's sarcophagus at Dahshur was intended as a royal cenotaph and that Senusret III was most likely buried in his underground tomb at Abydos rather than beneath the Dahshur pyramid. However, as Verner points out, Wegner's hypothesis remains unproven and questioned why the king would have departed from the tradition of royal pyramid burial. He also questions what religious or political circumstances might explain that choice. This description reflects Verner's assessment at the time of his publication was made, rather than a statement about the present state of this debate.

== Eastern pyramid temple and northern chapel ==
The pyramid temple of Senusret III stands against the eastern side of the main pyramid complex. The only surviving foundation of the pyramid temple consists of mudbrick subfoundations occupying an area of about 18.5-18.85 meters north-south by 14.8 meters east-west . Arnold found that the temple's brick foundation was separate, thinner, added after the pyramid foundation itself . According to Oppenheim, the pyramid temple was much smaller than those built by pharaohs of the Old Kingdom and early Middle Kingdom, reflecting changing conceptions of the afterlife and kingship; she mentions that the temple had no more than four decorated rooms.

A separate chapel was located at the northern side of Senusret III's pyramid. Arnold mentions that Perring's expedition in 1839, helped uncover a decorated building filled with hieroglyphics and stone paving (a brick platform) extending about 8.20 meters north of the pyramid's foundation, though this measurement describes the platform rather than the chapel dimensions . Furthermore, Adela mentions that among all the decorated royal buildings she investigated, the northern chapel lacks any clear signs of clear solar imagery.

== Royal women’s pyramids and burials ==
Smaller and underground pyramids associated with royal women formed part of Senusret III's Pyramid complex at Dahshur. Queen Nefret-henut and Princess Itakayet were identified as the owners of northern pyramids 2 and 3 respectively . Princess Senet-senebetes occupied Tomb 7 in the underground subsidiary queen's gallery rather than having her own separate pyramid. Inscriptions, chapel fragments, sarcophagus, and surviving burial objects provide evidence of these women's identities and funerary arrangements.

In Pyramid 2, Queen Nefret-henut's name and titles appeared on her sarcophagus and relief fragments from her eastern chapel, identifying her as the king's wife, hereditary princess, "she who sees Horus and Seth", (associated with the white crown). According to Daniel Fouquet, who examined her remains, the queen was likely between 40 and 45 years old when she died. Arnold excavations in 1997 uncovered part of the chapel's brick subfoundation, architectural pieces, and small relief fragments; surviving casing fragments established that the pyramid had an inclination of 62 to 62.5 degrees.

Arnold suggested that the base length is 16.80 meters, even though this couldn't be confirmed by Arnold. Arnold found that a second limestone sarcophagus was placed in the northern chamber of Nefret-henut tomb, but he couldn't identify who it belonged to. Queen Nefret sarcophagus, was made with dark almost yellow quartzite material, and it featured stone irregularities repaired with plaster. A pair of Wedjat eyes and an inscription with the queen name appeared on the north end of the east side; with carved details outlined in black almost ink . Arnold also found lever marks that were left by the robbers who tried raised its lid were still there, as well as he found a small piece of gold foil belonging to a nearby doorframe, supporting his conclusion that the tomb had received a burial and body was there.

Arnold, identified Princess Itakayet's pyramid through her inscribed name and titles on a tympanum block from the east chapel, naming her "king's (Senusret III) bodily daughter" . De Morgan had first thought of the monument as a mastaba or rectangular tomb. Arnold's investigations of the surviving foundations mentioned that pyramid 3, belonging to Itakayet had a base of 16.80 meters. Arnold excavated the chapel in 1996 and recovered relief decoration fragments, also pieces of a vaulted ceiling with yellow stars on a blue type of background, and alabaster fragments from an altar. One of the ceiling fragments was part of the inscribed tympanum piece that had Itakayet's name.

Arnold also found that Itakayet's burial chamber had a red granite sarcophagus with smooth surfaces, a curved lid, and no inscriptions or any carved decorations. A broken corner of the lid was repaired with plaster, and the sarcophagus was covered in a sort of pink wash. De Morgan reported finding an unopened red granite canopic chest behind her canopic shrine, containing two ordinary alabaster canopic jars and two unusual shaped oval alabaster jars, all with lids bearing human heads. Arnold mentions a flaw as De Morgan labeled them "near sarcophagus 3," which Arnold didn't know where the location was actually from, even though the granite chest belonged with Itakayet's sarcophagus and supports that it did in fact belong with her tomb.

Arnold points out that Princess Senet-senebetes's tomb is located on the southern side of the western gallery. Arnold found that she had a gray limestone sarcophagus with a curved lid and a base decorated with paneling and gateways. The north end of the eastern side had a pair of Wedjat eyes and an offering inscription naming Senet- senebetes as a king's (Senusret III) daughter. Arnold also found that robbers had tried opening the northern end part of the lid and did achieve opening it with a stone heavy block. Arnold found remains of decayed wood that managed to survive inside the sarcophagus and two silver objects were on top of the rims. Arnold also found a separate niche that held a limestone canopic chest with wood and scattered gold foil found in the front of it (possibly from the interior part of the wooden canopic box), while the bottom of the interior had bones, pots, herbs, and limestone and little pieces of plaster.

== Enlargement of the complex ==
=== Extended enclosure and construction ===
The complex was later expanded to the north and south at an uncertain date. Arnold suggests that these additions could date to the later part of Senusret III's reign. The southern extension measured 78.80 meters between the outside edges of the original and later extended southern enclosure walls foundation, while the northern extension measured 20.10 meters. The enlarged enclosure extended approximately 298.32 meters north-south, with its width remaining at 191.625 meters.

The new outer enclosure walls were built of brick and continued the original wall's pattern of altering projections and recesses. The builders had to make some modifications to where they joined the old corners and where the causeway connected to the eastern wall. Arnold mentions that some original corner projections probably were reduced to create a more regular appearance, though the loss of the upper brickwork by destruction and decay prevents his theory from being right. In the excavation part north of the causeway, the wall measured 3.76 meters thick and rested on a foundation platform of 4.35 meters wide, with recesses measuring 1.58 to 1.62 meters deep and 2.90 to 3.15 meters wide. The surviving and fallen brickwork helped Arnold to estimate an original above ground of 5.25 meters for the new south wall.

==== South temple: dimensions, materials, and design ====
The south temple had taken much of the southeastern courtyard. Arnold calculated it to measure about 47.25 meters north-south by 76.125 meters east-west. the front faced eastward toward the causeway, and a square projection extended from its southeastern corner. Arnold found that the temple's walls and paving stones were removed, leaving the foundation, brick subfoundations, and architectural and decorative fragments pieces as evidence of how it originally looked .

Arnold found that the brick subfoundation survived at four different levels, helping Arnold reconstruct the layout of a building that was above. Arnold mentions that it had a front courtyard, a main temple building that went westward, and a southeastern side he called a "palace". Arnold also found an entrance hall or porch supported by lotus- bundle columns that could have probably stood at the front, even though these features remained part of what Arnold reconstructed as the surviving fragments weren't enough to reconstruct a room or tell its foundation.

According to Arnold, five limestone staircase fragments were found in the central areas of the temple's southern and western sides, measuring approximately 38 cm wide, 14 cm high, and 25 to 28 cm deep. The best- preserved block retained three steps and part of a fourth, which Arnold interpreted as stairs leading to shrines or statue niches. There was also sockets beside the steps on the two blocks probably having wooden railings, although their purpose remains uncertain. Near the temple's western end, two granite slabs and several smaller fragments appear to originate from a shrine built by blocks that was not a monolithic one. These included a floor slab with plaster marks showing the positions of the wall and a ceiling fragment decorated with carved stars and traces of green pain.

== Decoration and religious importance ==
=== Solar imagery and the pyramid temple ===
Adela Oppenheim identified solar imagery in the pyramid temple attached to the east side of the main pyramid, preserved through exterior inscriptions and interior decorations. The exterior of the pyramid temple was adorned with five royal-name panels on each side of the northeast and southeastern corners, as well as on the west ends of the north and south walls, which were connected to the pyramid . The panels at each corner had different compositions focusing on Senusret III's five names alongside images of two the Egyptian goddesses Nekhbet and Wadjet (represented as a vulture and a cobra). The goddesses faced away from the corners, while the royal names faced toward them.

Oppenheim found that the exterior of Senusret III's pyramid temple had five royal panels on each side of the northeast and southeast corners, across the bottom was a horizontal line listing divine blessings. Oppenheim also identified that the lowermost fifth panels included similar texts to bau of Iunu, describing the king as the son of Ra of his body beloved of the bau Iunu, with the adjacent outer column mentioning the first sed festival. Oppenheim also mentions that its exterior inscriptions had three references to the king as one beloved by Ra-Horakhty. Oppenheim argues that the repeated solar references indicate that they didn't serve as geographical references on a wall but more an important aspect of the pyramid temple's true significance.

==== The King Divine Birth and Scenes ====
Oppenheim found that the causeway included two scenes related to solar cults, in which one of them was the divine birth of the Pharaoh Senusret III, conception, and adolescence. Oppenheim mentions that prior to her discovery, it was believed that depictions of the Pharaoh's divine origin began only in the middle kingdom with the sequences in the Hatshepsut temple at Deir el-Bahari. Oppenheim identified a lower part of an episode among Senusret III's fragments, in which two deities faced each other and one of the deities bent over a round yellow object. Another fragment showed the pharaoh as a child who underwent purification and is embraced by an enthroned deity.

A second group of causeways reliefs sequences depicts connection to a sun cult, including representations of the natural world and human activities associated with the three seasons of the Egyptian year. Individual scenes were framed at the top, bottom, and sides by bands filled with two rows of stars. Below the upper star bands were boxes containing sun-disks (ra-signs), followed by inscriptions and representations of human and animal activities. Oppenheim proposes that these scenes formed a calendar-like arrangement showing events associated with different times of the year. One fragment preserves a reference to the "peret" season without naming a particular month. Because the sun-disk signs represent both "day" and the sun god Ra, Oppenheim suggests that a double meaning: the sun governs the passage of days and the seasonal activities of people, animals and the natural world.

===== Jubilee imagery and the south temple =====
Oppenheim found reliefs and statue fragments from the south temple show Senusret III wearing clothing and carrying objects associated with the sed festival, a royal jubilee connected with the renewal of kingship. Oppenheim identified these representations as an important part of the temple's solar imagery. According to Oppenheim the reliefs show figures at different scales, suggesting that they decorated separate areas or rows heights with one room. However, their incomplete preservation prevents a clear reconstruction of the ceremonies or their sequences. One relief shows the king at a smaller size, compared to his actual size, wearing the white crown and a short blue-green jubilee cloak. Senusret III carried two scepters and presumably a crook and flail. His eyebrows and cosmetic lines were also blue-green, which Oppenheim points out that it interprets as his transformed, divine statues. Projecting in front of the cloak are six stripes at a downward angle, painted with patterns of falcon feathers and leopard spots.

Oppenheim suggests that these projections stripes most likely came from another garment worn beneath the cloak, presumably the royal plume dress from Twelfth Dynasty scenes. Other fragments in the south temple depict ceremonial standards, including a magnificent Wepwawet. An oversized life-size representation of the king's back foot, leg, and bull's tail might have belonged to a scene of him running between markers. However, Oppenheim mentions that the same leg position could occur in the festival scene of him smiting foreigners. Granodiorite fragments discovered in 2019 belonged to a large representation of the king wearing a knee-length sed festival jubilee cloak with a stiff collar and striped border . Oppenheim mentions that from the hand dimensions she found that the king may have been doubled in size compared to this statue and that smaller royal women figures may have been beside him.

====== Meaning and significance of the religious imagery ======
Oppenheim interprets the solar imagery at Senusret III's pyramid complex as a sun symbol as expressing the king's close relationship, and dependence on the sun god Ra. Oppenheim warns that solar imagery references to Ra and other solar deities didn't necessarily mean that they were worshipped in the temples but rather the sun cult was established to manifest the king's close connection to and dependency on these deities for power and perhaps the afterlife.

Oppenheim also points out that Senusret III pyramid complex incorporated imagery associated with sun cults that had been identified in earlier pyramid complexes, while introducing new or distinctive form of representations. Oppenheim mentions that these included divine figures with solar connections, who lacked their own cult places, inscriptions and scenes related to the gods of Heliopolis, jubilee statues(sed festival), representations of Ra as the king's divine father, and the scenes of the seasons of the year.

The appearance of these solar themes in several buildings suggests that solar beliefs formed an important part of the complex's religious meaning/significance. Oppenheim mentions that it perhaps was connected with new architectural forms within the Senusret III pyramid complex itself and the changes in religious belief during the late Twelfth Dynasty. Although the incomplete fragments and other remains, limits the reconstruction process of ceremonies and rooms in the south temple, Oppenheim concludes by mentioning that solar cult (beliefs) was a significant part of the complex's religious meaning.

== See also ==
- List of Egyptian pyramids
