= Four sons of Horus =

Ancient Egyptian gods

Imsety, Duamutef, Hapy, and Qebehsenuef
- The four sons of Horus, from left: Imsety, Duamutef, Hapy, and Qebehsenuef
Name in hieroglyphs
Aa15 s O34 U33
Imsety
Aa5 p y
Hapy
N14 G14 t f
Duamutef
W15 T22 T22 T22 f Qebehsenuef
- Symbol: Canopic jars, canopic chests, Liver (Imsety), Lungs (Hapy), Stomach (Duamutef), Intestines (Qebehsenuef)
- Parents: Horus the Elder and Isis

The four sons of Horus were a group of four deities in ancient Egyptian religion who were believed to protect the dead in the afterlife. Beginning in the First Intermediate Period of Egyptian history (c. 2181–2055 BC), Imsety, Hapy, Duamutef, and Qebehsenuef were especially connected with the four canopic jars that housed the internal organs which were removed from the body of the deceased during the process of mummification. Most commonly, Imsety protected the liver, Hapy the lungs, Duamutef the stomach, and Qebehsenuef the intestines, but this pattern often varied. The canopic jars were given lids that represented the heads of the sons of Horus. Although they were originally portrayed as humans, in the latter part of the New Kingdom (c. 1550–1070 BC), they took on their most distinctive iconography, in which Imsety is portrayed as a human, Hapy as a baboon, Duamutef as a jackal, and Qebehsenuef as a falcon. The four sons were also linked with stars in the sky, with regions of Egypt, and with the cardinal directions.

The worship of the sons of Horus was almost entirely restricted to funerary practice. The sons were first mentioned late in the Old Kingdom (c. 2686–2181 BC) in the Pyramid Texts and continued to be invoked in funerary texts throughout ancient Egyptian history. Their connection with the canopic jars was established in the First Intermediate Period, and afterward they became ubiquitous in the decoration of canopic chests, coffins, and sarcophagi. Although they were increasingly closely associated with the internal organs, they continued to appear in burial equipment even after the use of canopic jars was abandoned in the Ptolemaic Period (303–30 BC), disappearing only in the fourth century AD with the extinction of the ancient Egyptian funerary tradition.

== Names and origins ==
The sons of Horus as free-standing figures

Imsety (jmstj, also Amset), Hapy (ḥpy), Duamutef (dwꜣ-mwt.f), and Qebehsenuef (qbḥ-snw.f) are first mentioned in the Pyramid Texts, the earliest ancient Egyptian funerary texts, in the late Old Kingdom (24th and 23rd centuries BC). In numerous sources, such as Spell 541 of the Pyramid Texts, they are stated to be the children of Horus, one of the major deities of the Egyptian pantheon. In a few of these texts they are instead called the children of the god Atum, the god Geb, or the goddess Nut. A passage in the Coffin Texts from the Middle Kingdom (c. 2055–1650 BC) says they are the offspring of the goddess Isis and a form of Horus known as Horus the Elder.

In the Pyramid Texts, the sons of Horus are said to assist the deceased king in the afterlife. In Spell 688, for example, they "make firm a ladder" for the king to ascend into the sky, while in Spell 338 they protect him from hunger and thirst. Egyptologists often treat the protection of the deceased as their primary role, though Maarten Raven argues that the four sons originated as celestial deities, given that the Pyramid Texts frequently connect them with the sky and that Horus himself was a sky deity.

The name of Duamutef means "He who praises his mother", while Qebehsenuef means "He who purifies his brother by means of libation". The Egyptologist James P. Allen translates Hapy's name as "He of Haste" and Imsety as "He of the Dill"; another Egyptologist, Joshua Roberson, believes Imsety originated as a personification of this herb. Imsety's name also resembled the Egyptian word for "liver" (mjst), which may be the reason why he became specifically linked with the liver.

The name of Imsety incorporates the Egyptian grammatical dual ending (-ty or -wy), and the name of Hapy may have originally done so as well, incorporating a w that was later lost. For this reason, the Egyptologist John Taylor argues that these two sons were originally two male and female pairs of deities.

== Roles ==
=== Protectors of the deceased ===
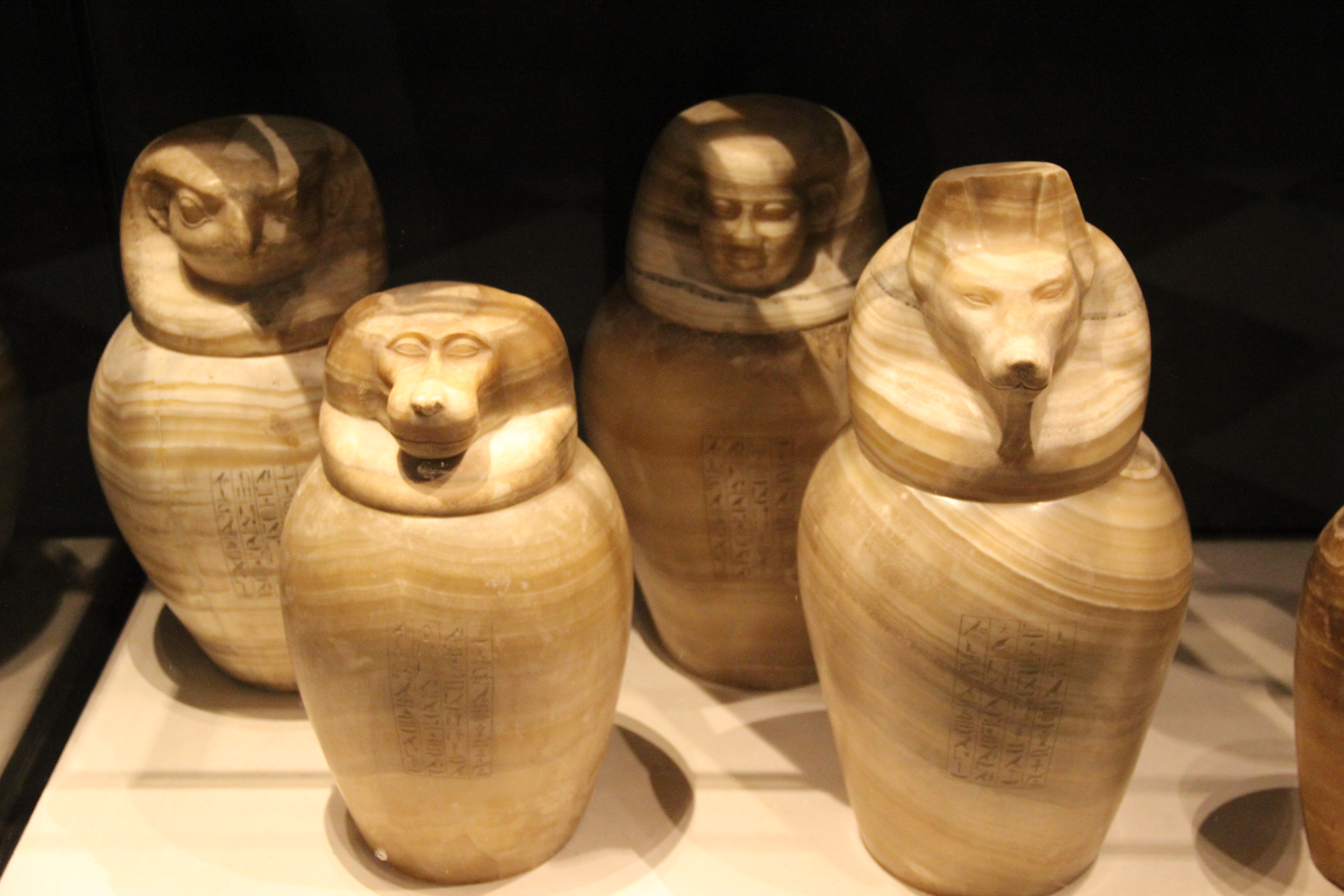
Animal-headed canopic jars from the Twenty-sixth Dynasty (664–525 BC)

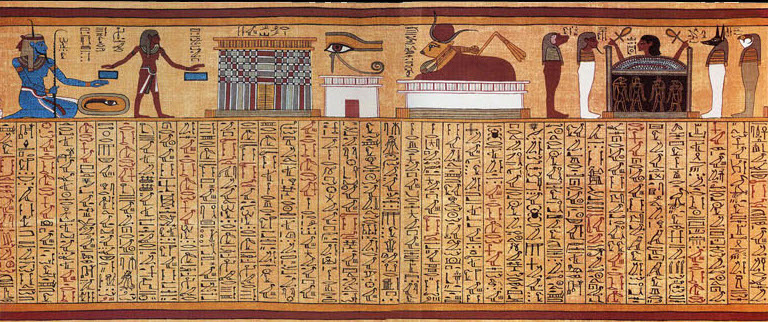
A vignette in the Book of the Dead of Ani (c. 1250 BC) depicts a personified canopic chest flanked by the sons of Horus.

Texts from later periods continue to invoke the sons of Horus for protection in the afterlife as the Pyramid Texts do. In many texts they were said to protect Osiris, the funerary deity whose mythological death and resurrection served as the template for ancient Egyptian funerary practices. Some texts even refer to them as the sons of Osiris rather than Horus. In a Middle Kingdom ritual, recorded in the Dramatic Ramesseum Papyrus, the sons of Horus aid Osiris in his rejuvenation after death, fight the followers of his enemy Set, and restore the lost Eye of Horus to their father. Spell 137 of the Book of the Dead from the New Kingdom (c. 1550–1070 BC) says to them, "as you spread your protection over your father Osiris-Khentiamentiu, so spread your protection over [the deceased person]". In the tenth section of the New Kingdom Book of Gates, a funerary text that depicts the underworld in detail, the four sons are portrayed holding chains that bind the malign beings called wmmtj, meaning "snakes".

The four sons developed a specialized connection with the internal organs of the deceased. During the mummification process, four internal organs—the lungs, liver, stomach, and intestines—were removed from the body and dried before being placed in the burial, usually separately from the body. In the late Old Kingdom, these organs began to be placed in a set of jars known as canopic jars, and during the First Intermediate Period (c. 2181–2055 BC), the jars began to be inscribed with texts invoking the sons of Horus. No text specifies which of the sons protect which organ. Burials in which the jars and organs survive show that the most common arrangement was for Imsety to guard the liver, Hapy the lungs, Duamutef the stomach, and Qebehsenuef the intestines, but many variations are known. For instance, in some cases Hapy protected the stomach and Duamutef the lungs.

The sons of Horus themselves were thought to be under the protection of four goddesses, usually Isis for Imsety, Nephthys for Hapy, Neith for Duamutef, and Serqet for Qebehsenuef. In the Middle Kingdom, this scheme could vary and sometimes included different goddesses, so that Sendjet guarded Duamutef and Renenutet guarded Qebehsenuef. In some inscriptions from Middle Kingdom coffins, the goddesses are invoked to protect the son of Horus "who is in you [the deceased]", suggesting that the sons were equated with the internal organs as well as being their protectors.

=== Directions and regions of the cosmos ===
The sons of Horus were also connected with the sky or parts of the cosmos as the Egyptians envisioned it. In the New Kingdom, they were sometimes thought of as stars in the northern sky or as birds flying to the four corners of the world. Bernard Mathieu suggests that they were equated with the four stars at the corners of the constellation Orion (Saiph, Betelgeuse, Bellatrix, and Rigel) and with four of the stars in Ursa Major (Megrez, Phecda, Merak, and Dubhe).

Several Egyptologists have suggested that the four sons were equated with the four pillars that supported the vault of the sky in Egyptian cosmology. They were also connected with regions of Egypt: they were sometimes equated with the Souls of Nekhen and Pe, a set of deities that represented the Predynastic rulers of Upper Egypt in the south and Lower Egypt in the north. Hapy and Duamutef were linked with the Lower Egyptian city of Buto, and Imsety and Qebehsenuef with the Upper Egyptian city of Nekhen.

Egyptian beliefs drew analogies between the human body and the cosmos, and these analogies were particularly visible in burial customs. In Middle Kingdom burials, bodies were laid out with the head to the north and the feet to the south. The texts that decorated coffins in this period placed some deities in consistent locations, thus linking them with particular directions. Imsety and Hapy were invoked at the head of the coffin, with Imsety on the left and Hapy on the right, thus placing Imsety in the northeast and Hapy in the northwest. Duamutef and Qebehsenuef were invoked at the foot of the coffin, with Duamutef on the left and Qebehsenuef on the right, thus placing Duamutef in the southeast and Qebehsenuef in the southwest. Canopic chests of the time placed each deity in equivalent positions. These orientations suggest that the sons of Horus were linked with the four corners of the Egyptian cosmos. Their orientation may be related to the positions of each organ: the lungs and liver sit higher in the body, thus fitting the northerly position of Imsety and Hapy, while the stomach and intestines are lower down, matching the southerly position of Duamutef and Qebehsenuef.

The sons' positions shifted in the New Kingdom, when burials came to be laid out with the head to the west and the feet in the east. On some coffins, Imsety and Hapy remained at the head and Duamutef and Qebehsenuef at the foot, but in each pair, the deity who had been on the left side was moved to the right, and vice versa. In other cases, each of the sons of Horus appeared on a side wall of the coffin or canopic chest: Imsety in the south, Hapy in the north, Duamutef in the east, and Qebehsenuef in the west. The latter placement, with the sons of Horus on four sides rather than four corners, links the four deities with the cardinal directions rather than the corners of the cosmos. The coexistence of the two systems of orientation suggests that the Egyptians did not sharply distinguish the four corners from the four directions.

== Iconography ==
The lids of canopic jars began to be sculpted in the shape of heads at the end of the First Intermediate Period, at the same time that the jars' inscriptions began to invoke the sons of Horus. These lids are therefore probably meant to represent the four sons rather than the organs' deceased owner. In some of the earliest examples, the lids have falcon heads, but in the Middle Kingdom, human heads became the norm. In some of these cases, Imsety, unlike the others, is portrayed as a woman.

In the Eighteenth Dynasty (c. 1550–1292 BC), a few canopic jars were given varying heads: Imsety was portrayed as a man, Hapy as a baboon, Duamutef as a jackal and Qebehsenuef as a falcon. This iconography became standard during the reign of Ramesses II in the thirteenth century BC and remained so for the rest of ancient Egyptian history, although in the Third Intermediate Period the animal forms were frequently confused. For instance, Duamutef was often portrayed as a falcon and Qebehsenuef as a jackal.

In addition to the jars themselves, the four sons were often portrayed on the canopic chests that housed the jars, as well as on coffins and other burial equipment. In the vignette that accompanies Spell 125 of the Book of the Dead, they appear as small figures standing on a lotus flower in front of the throne of Osiris. In an exceptional portrayal, in the wall decoration in WV23, the tomb of Ay from the late Eighteenth Dynasty, the four sons are portrayed as fully human, with Imsety and Hapy wearing the red crown of Lower Egypt and Duamutef and Qebehsenuef wearing the white crown of Upper Egypt.

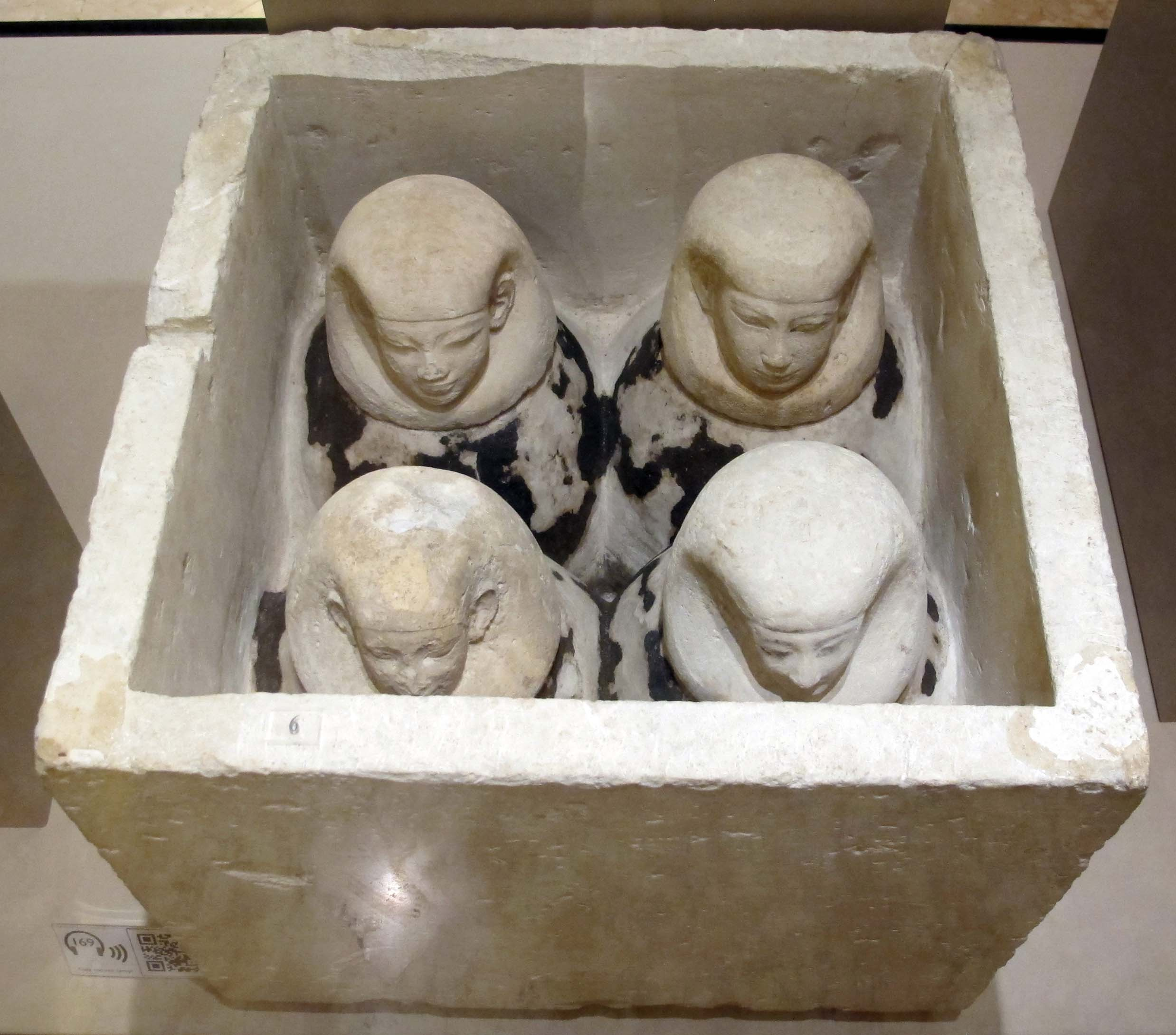
A canopic chest with human-headed jars, from the Middle Kingdom (c. 2055–1650 BC)

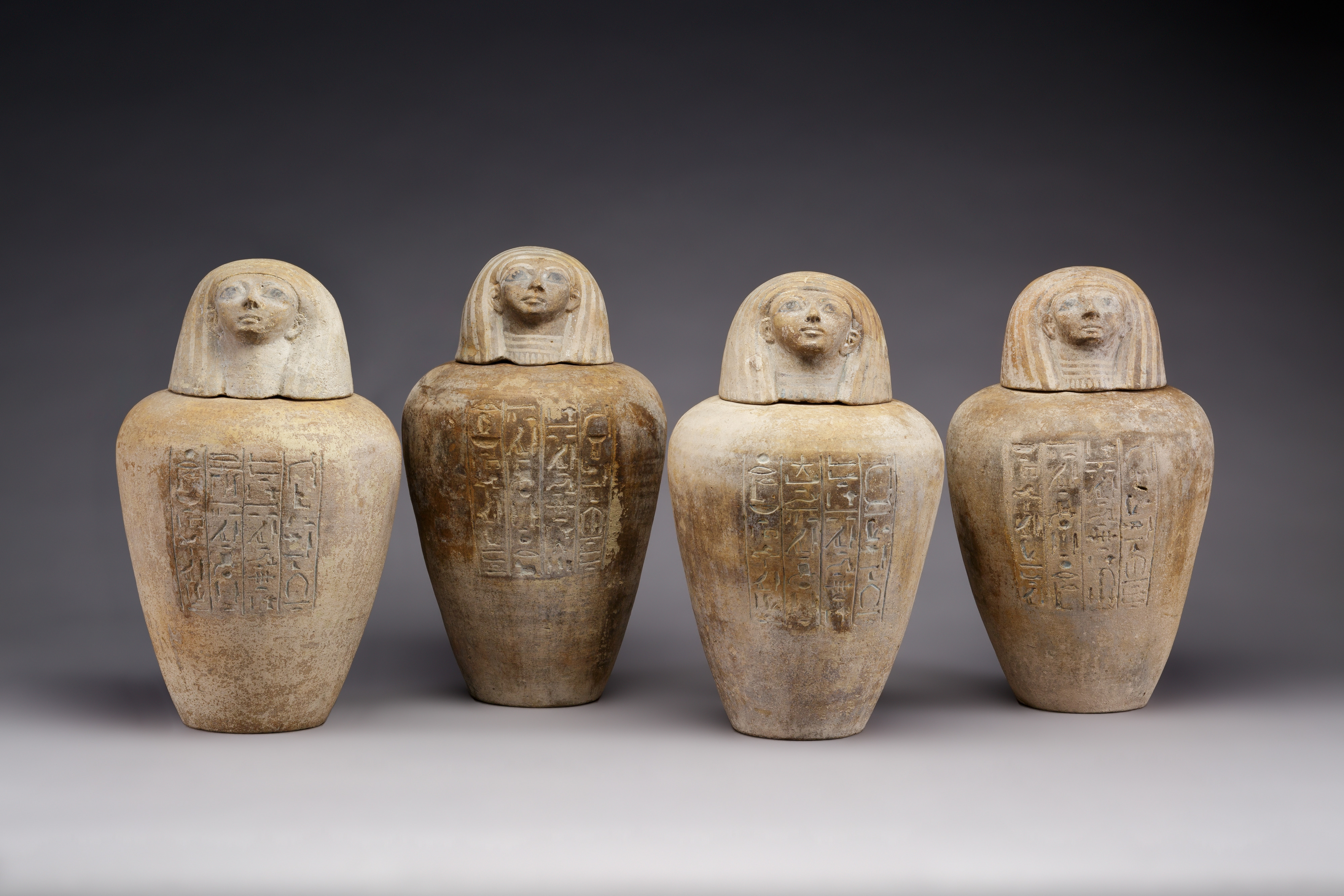
Human-headed canopic jars from the early Eighteenth Dynasty, c. 1504–1447 BC

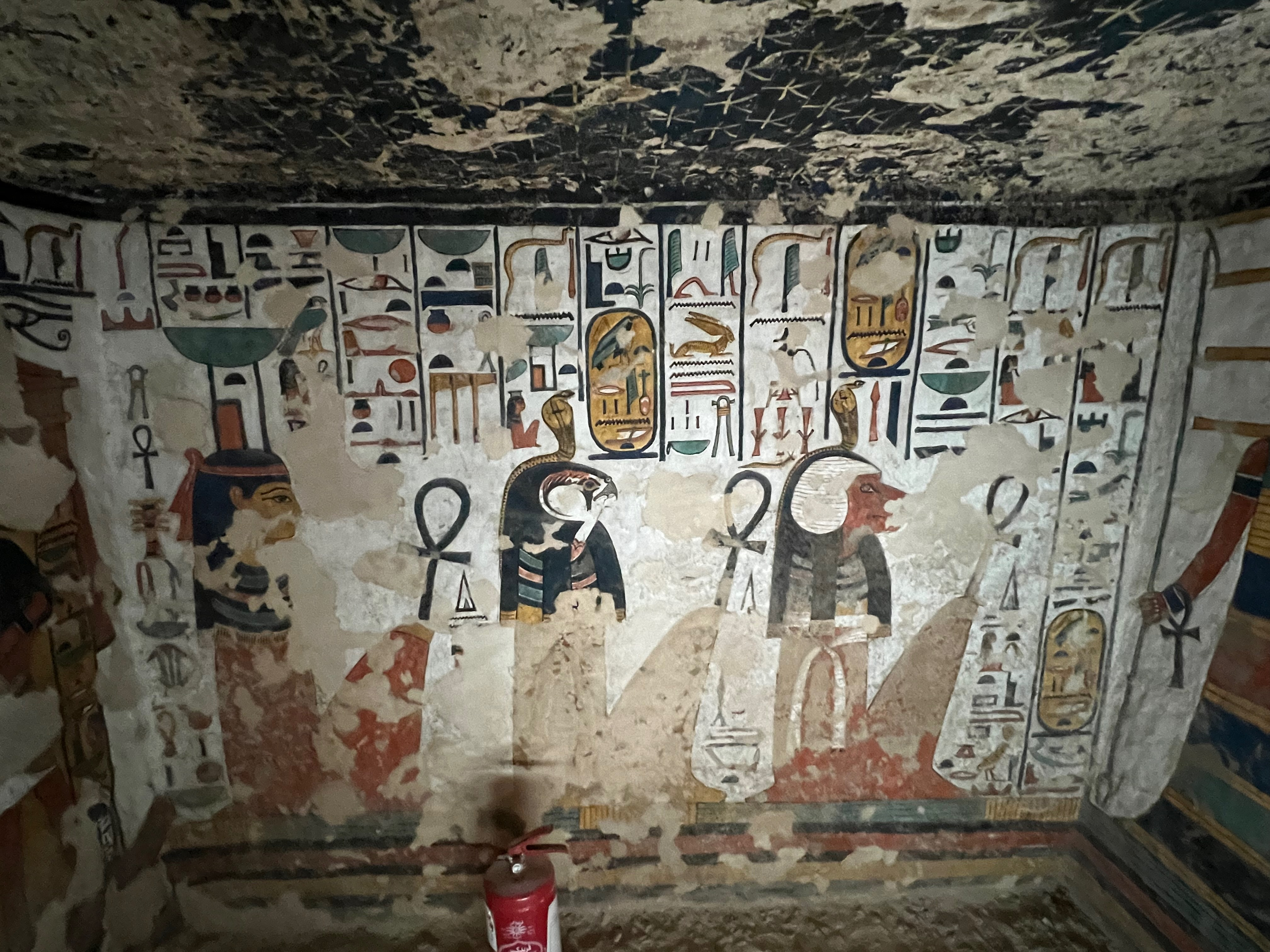
Qebehsenuef (center) and Hapy (right), depicted in the tomb of Nefertari (QV66), c. 1250 BC

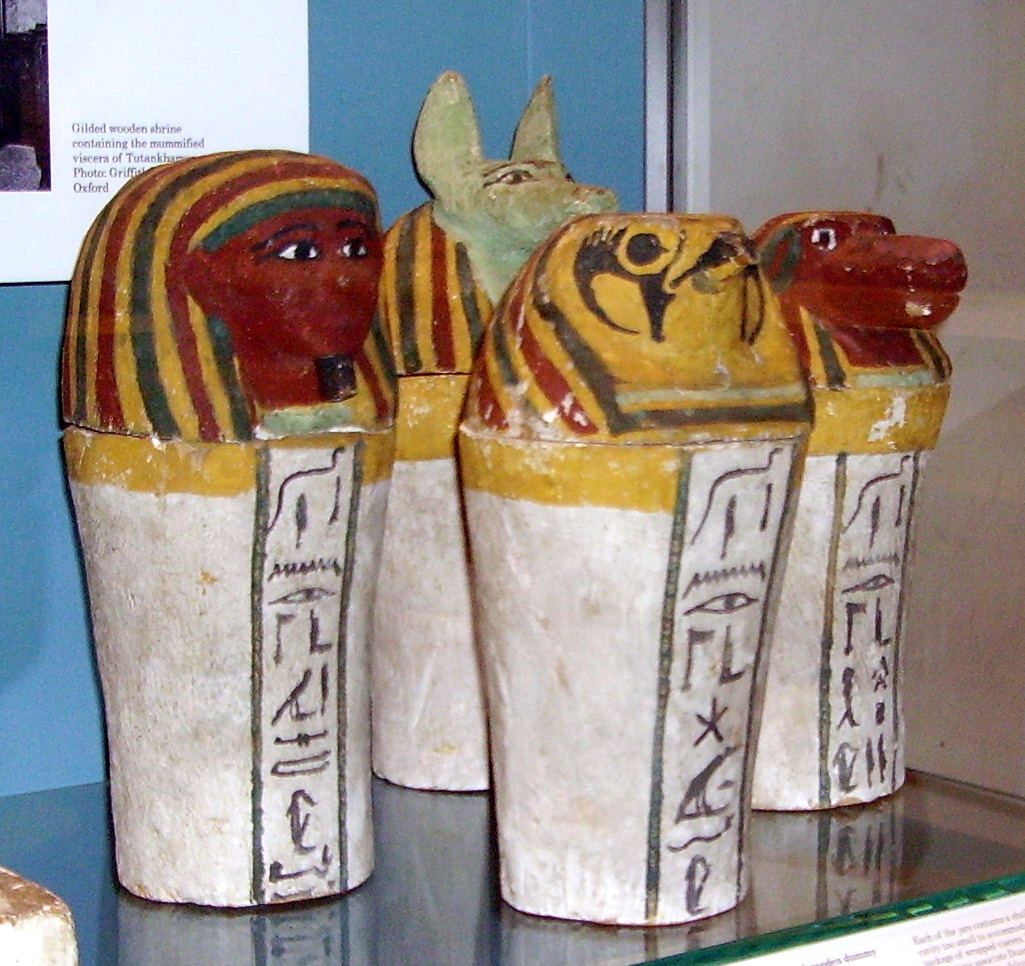
Animal-headed canopic jars from the Twenty-fifth Dynasty (c. 744–664 BC)

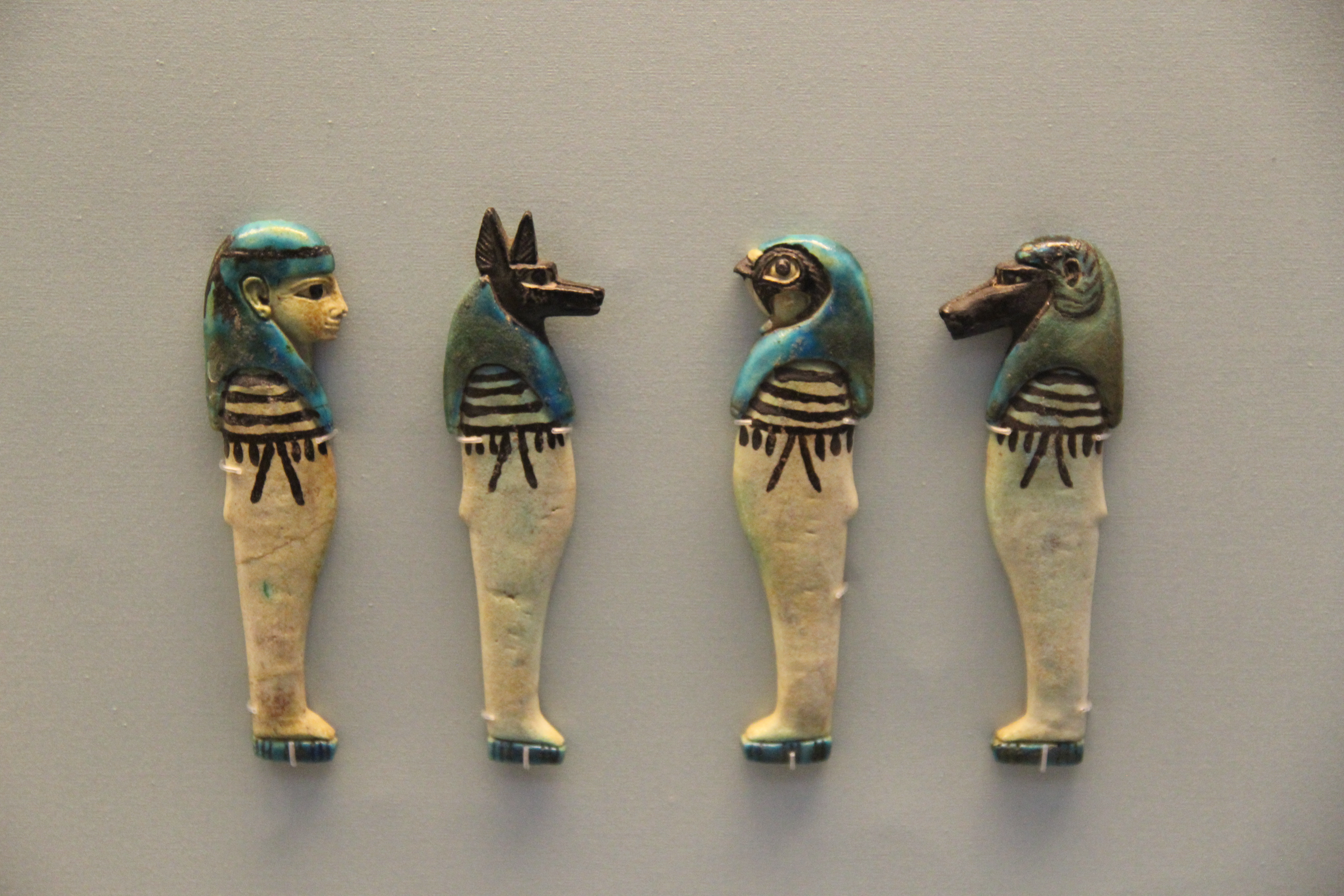
Amulets of the four sons of Horus from the Third Intermediate Period (c. 1070–664 BC)

== Worship ==
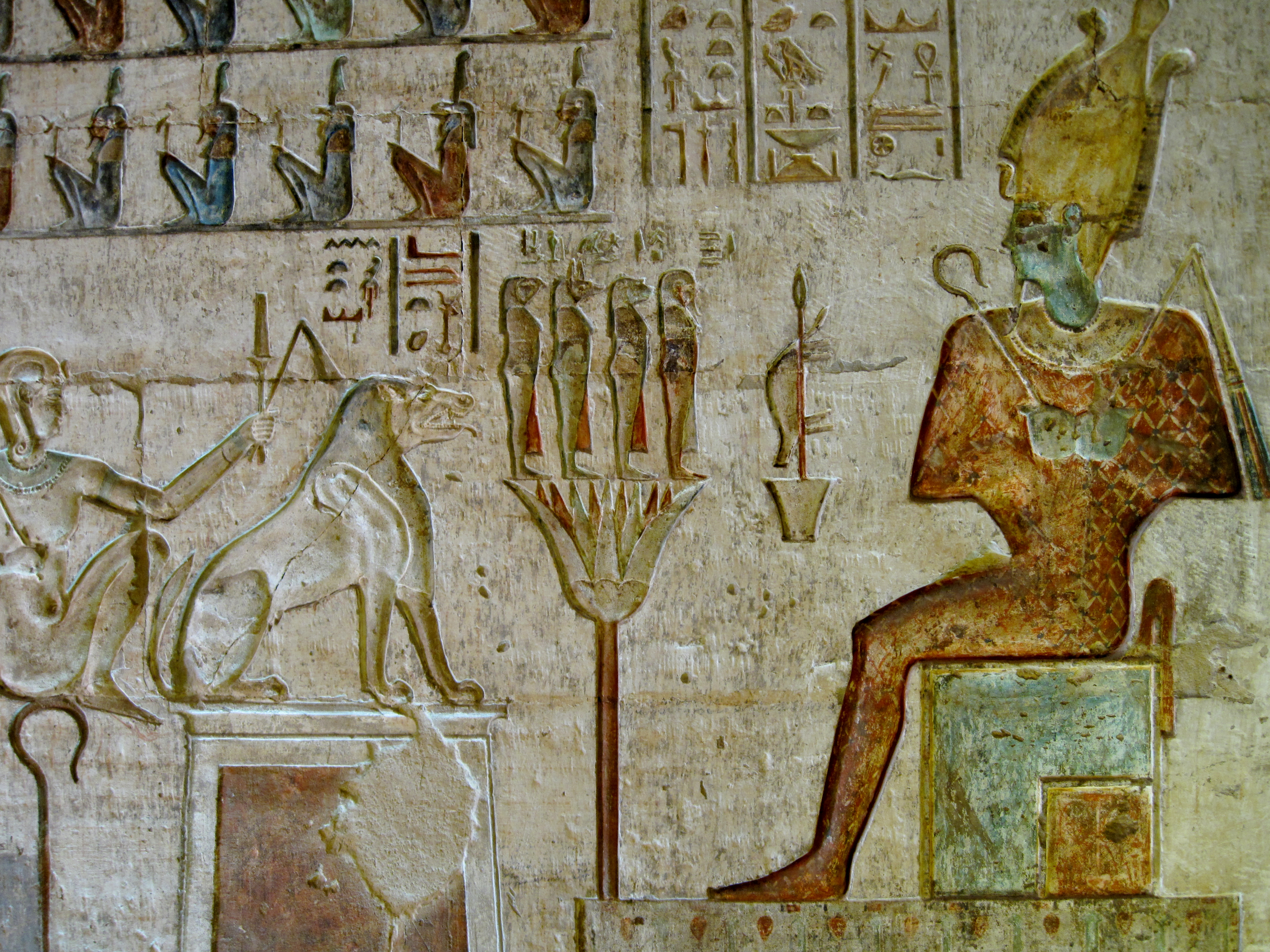
The sons of Horus portrayed on a lotus flower before the throne of Osiris, from the Ptolemaic temple at Deir el-Medina, third century BC

The four sons did not receive the regular cultic worship that major Egyptian deities did, and they appeared exclusively in funerary contexts. They play a minor role in the ritual from the Dramatic Ramesseum Papyrus, whose purpose is uncertain but has commonalities with funerary rites, but they were found most commonly in the tomb itself. From the Middle Kingdom onward, they were almost always portrayed or invoked in the decoration of coffins, sarcophagi, and canopic equipment. During the late New Kingdom, jars that contained shabtis, a common type of funerary figurine, were given lids shaped like the heads of the sons of Horus, similar to the lids of canopic jars.

In the Twentieth Dynasty of the New Kingdom (1189–1077 BC), embalmers began placing wax figurines of the sons of Horus inside the body cavity. Soon afterward, at the beginning of the Third Intermediate Period, Egyptians ceased to store organs in canopic jars and instead embalmed each organ separately, wrapping them together with the corresponding wax figurines and returning them to the body cavity. Wealthy burials continued to include canopic jars with no organs inside. Toward the end of this period, the four sons were also portrayed in faience amulets attached to the exterior wrappings of the mummy. During this period, the decoration of human-shaped coffins placed the four sons near the abdomen of the mummy rather than distributing them around the coffin, a sign that their connection with the internal organs was overshadowing their other roles.

The use of canopic jars ceased in the early Ptolemaic Period (303–30 BC), and the use of canopic chests died out in the middle of that period. Yet in Ptolemaic and Roman times, the sons of Horus continued to appear on other burial goods, such as decorated stucco casings on wrapped mummies. A set of instructions for the embalming process, dating to the first or second century AD, calls for four officiants to take on the role of the sons of Horus as the deceased person's hand is wrapped. The last references to the sons of Horus in burial goods date to the fourth century AD, near the end of the ancient Egyptian funerary tradition.

== Works cited ==
- Allen, James P. (2015). The Ancient Egyptian Pyramid Texts, Second Edition. Society of Biblical Literature. ISBN 978-1-62837-114-7.
- Dodson, Aidan (2001). "Four Sons of Horus". In Redford, Donald B. (ed.). The Oxford Encyclopedia of Ancient Egypt. Vol. 1. Oxford University Press. pp. 561–563. ISBN 978-0-19-510234-5.
- Faulkner, Raymond O. (1973). The Ancient Egyptian Coffin Texts, Volume I: Spells 1–354. Aris & Phillips. ISBN 978-0-85668-005-2.
- Geisen, Christina (2018). A Commemoration Ritual for Senwosret I: P. BM EA 10610.1–5/P. Ramesseum B (Ramesseum Dramatic Papyrus). Yale Egyptological Institute. ISBN 978-0-9740025-9-0.
- Goelet, Ogden; Faulkner, Raymond O.; Andrews, Carol A. R.; Gunther, J. Daniel; Wasserman, James (2015). The Egyptian Book of the Dead: The Book of Going forth by Day, Twentieth Anniversary Edition. Chronicle Books. ISBN 978-1-4521-4438-2.
- Hart, George (2005). The Routledge Dictionary of Egyptian Gods and Goddesses, Second Edition. Routledge. ISBN 978-0-203-02362-4.
- Ikram, Salima; Dodson, Aidan (1998). The Mummy in Ancient Egypt: Equipping the Dead for Eternity. Thames & Hudson. ISBN 978-0-500-05088-0.
- Mathieu, Bernard (2008). "Les Enfants d'Horus, théologie et astronomie" (PDF). Égypte Nilotique et Méditerranéenne (in French). 1: 7–14.
- Pinch, Geraldine (2002). Egyptian Mythology: A Guide to the Gods, Goddesses, and Traditions of Ancient Egypt. Oxford University Press. ISBN 978-0-19-517024-5.
- Raven, Maarten (2005). "Egyptian Concepts on the Orientation of the Human Body". The Journal of Egyptian Archaeology. 91: 37–53. doi:10.1177/030751330509100103. JSTOR 3822392. S2CID 162109010.
- Roberson, Joshua Aaron (2013). The Awakening of Osiris and the Transit of the Solar Barques: Royal Apotheosis in a Most Concise Book of the Underworld and Sky. Editions Universitaires Friborg Suisse / Vandenhoeck & Ruprecht Göttingen. ISBN 978-3-7278-1746-5 / ISBN 978-3-525-54387-0
- Smith, Mark (2009). Traversing Eternity: Texts for the Afterlife from Ptolemaic and Roman Egypt. Oxford University Press. ISBN 978-0-19-815464-8.
- Taylor, John (2001). Death and the Afterlife in Ancient Egypt. University of Chicago Press. ISBN 978-0-226-79164-7.
- "Amset". The Global Egyptian Museum.
- Wilkinson, Richard H. (2003). The Complete Gods and Goddesses of Ancient Egypt. Thames & Hudson. ISBN 978-0500051207.
