= Senetsenebtysy =

Ancient Egyptian king's daughter

Senetsenebtysy (fl. c. 1800 BC) was an ancient Egyptian king's daughter of the Twelfth Dynasty. She was most likely a daughter of king Senusret III.

== Pyramid of Senusret III ==
Senetsenebtysy is only known from her burial next to the Pyramid of Senusret III at Dahshur. On the North side of the pyramid were four smaller pyramids for wives of the king and several further burials for daughters of the king. The gallery with these burials was excavated in 1894 by Jacques de Morgan. Here were small chambers along the gallery containing the sarcophagi and stone canopic chest of the princesses. Only two of the sarcophagi were inscribed, naming the king's daughter Menet and the king's daughter Senetsenebtysy. From the position of her burial it seems likely that Senetsenebtysy was the daughter of Senusret III.
