= Alkali feldspar granite =

Type of igneous rock rich in alkali feldspar

- Igneous rock
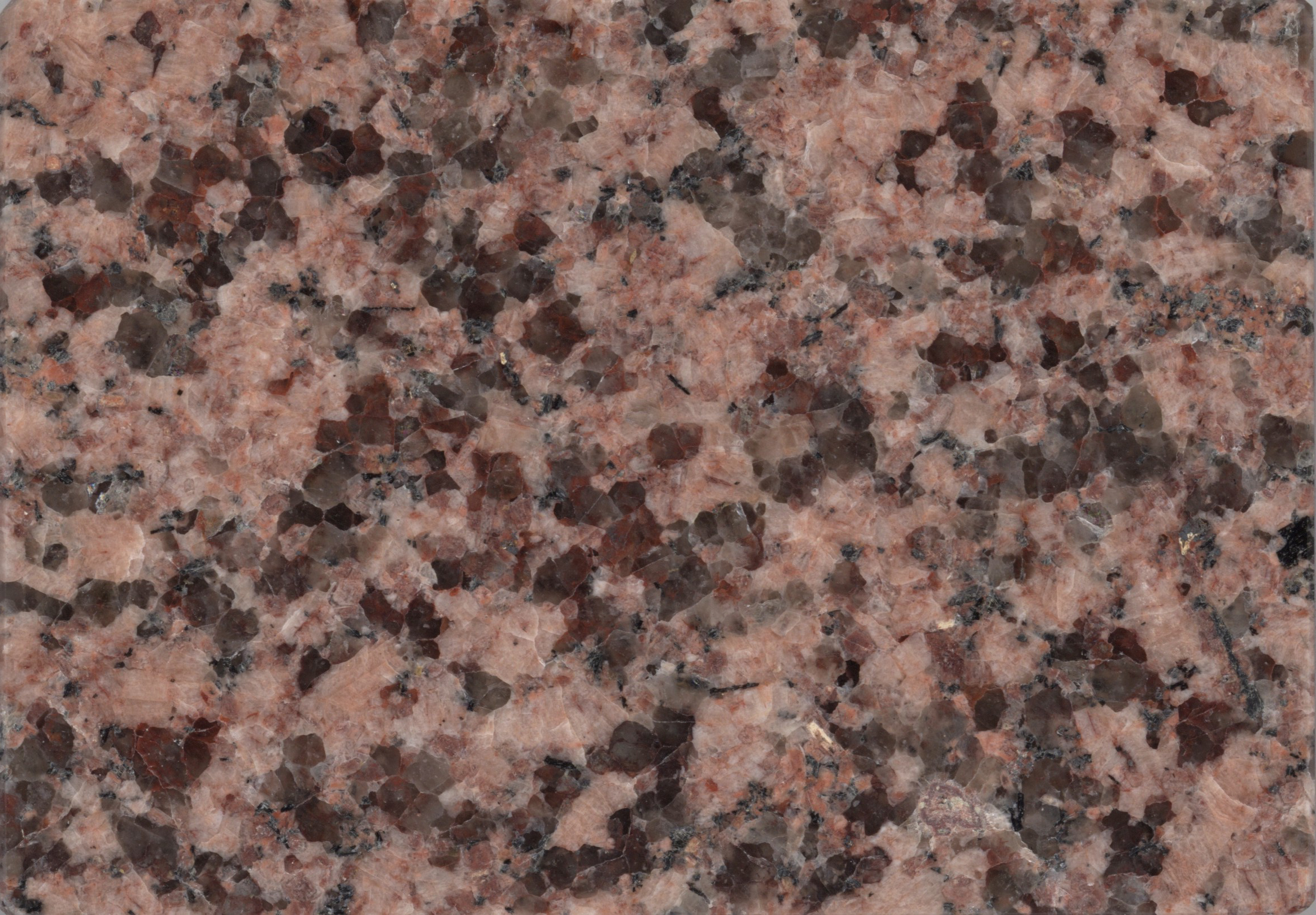
- Alkali feldspar granite. Holocrystalline texture, coarse-grained. Great amounts of potassium feldspar (orthoclase, pink-reddish in colour)

Composition
- Primary: Potassium feldspar, quartz
- Secondary: Plagioclase; dark minerals

Alkali feldspar granite, some varieties of which are called 'red granite', is a felsic igneous rock and a type of granite rich in the mineral potassium feldspar (K-spar). It is a dense rock with a phaneritic texture. The abundance of K-spar gives the rock a predominant pink to reddish hue peppered with minor amounts of black minerals.

QAPF diagram for classification of plutonic rocks

== Chemical composition ==
As shown in the QAPF diagram, alkali feldspar granite contains between 20% - 60% quartz. Less quartz content would lead to "quartz alkali feldspar syenite". More than 90% of the total feldspar content is in the form of alkali feldspar. Less than that amount would designate the rock as a granite.

Mineral assemblage of igneous rocks

Other incorporated silicate minerals may include, very minor amounts of plagioclase feldspar, mica in the form of muscovite and/or biotite, and amphibole (often hornblende). Oxide minerals such as magnetite, ilmenite, or ulvospinel. Some sulfides and phosphates (mainly apatite) may also be present.

== Occurrence ==
Alkali feldspar granites generally occur with other alkali-rich granitoids, such as monzogranite and syenogranite, forming part of the A-type granites. They are found in a wide range of tectonic settings and their origins remain uncertain.

== Uses ==
Granitic rocks in general are of interest to geologists, geochemists, etc., because they provide 'crystallized' telltale clues of their environment of formation.

Alkali feldspar granite is used as construction material in the form of dimension stones, and polished slabs or tiles for building facades, pavements, and kitchen countertops.
