= Maarten Raven =

Dutch Egyptologist (born 1953)

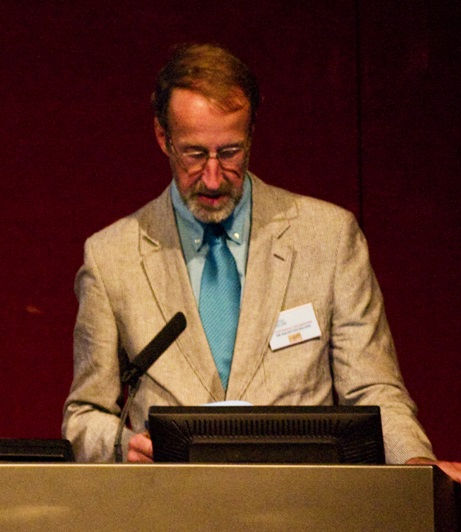
Maarten Raven in 2009

Maarten J. Raven (born 1953, Utrecht) is a Dutch Egyptologist.

Raven is the curator (since 1978) of the department of Egyptology at the Rijksmuseum van Oudheden in Leiden. In addition to his work at the museum, he has been active as an archeologist in Saqqara since 1975. In Saqqara, he has been working (as joint field director since 1999) on a New Kingdom archeological burial site, a cooperation of the Rijksmuseum van Oudheden and the Egypt Exploration Society (1975–1998) and Leiden University (1999-) In September 2012 he was also appointed as extraordinary professor 'Museology of Ancient Egypt' at Leiden University.

Raven studied Egyptian languages, art history and archeology at Leiden University, and wrote a PhD thesis ("Symbols of resurrection: three studies in ancient Egyptian iconography") in 1984. Raven published extensively on the collections of the Rijksmuseum van Oudheden and his field work at Saqqara.

== Publications ==
- The tomb of Iurudef, a Memphite official in the reign of Ramesses II (57th Excavation Memoir, Leiden/London, 1991)
- The tomb of Maya and Meryt, II: objects and skeletal remains (65th Excavation Memoir, Leiden/London 2001)
- J.H. Insinger (introduced and annotated by M.J. Raven), "In het land der Nijlcataracten" (1883), (MVEOL 34, Leuven/Leiden 2004)
- Egyptian mummies, radiological atlas of the collections in the National Museum of Antiquities at Leiden (PALMA Egyptology 1, Turnhout, 2005)
- The tomb of Pay and Raia at Saqqara (74th Excavation Memoir, Leiden/London, 2005)
- Egyptische Magie, het toverboek van Thot (Walburg Pers, Leiden, 2010)
- The Memphite tomb of Horemheb, commander in chief of Tutankhamun, V: the forecourt and the area south of the tomb, with some notes on the tomb of Tia (PALMA Egyptology 6, Turnhout: Brepols, 2011)
