= Menet (princess) =

Menet (Egyptian: mnt) was an ancient Egyptian king's daughter living in the Twelfth Dynasty most likely under the kings Senusret III and Amenemhat III.

== Biography ==
Menet had the titles king's daughter and the one united with the white crown (Khenemetneferhedjet). She is only known from her sarcophagus and burial in a gallery tomb buried with other members of the royal family next to the pyramid of Senusret III at Dahshur. From the position of the tomb it seems likely that she was the daughter of the latter king. There are several tomb equipments.

- Tomb equipment Cairo CG 4005 | At Dahshur, a calcite canopic jar.
- Tomb equipment Cairo CG 4006 | At Dahshur, a calcite canopic jar.
- Tomb equipment de Morgan, Dahchour I, 56 fig. 122 | At Dahshur, a stone sarcophagus.
