= Canopic jar =

Jar in which organs are kept

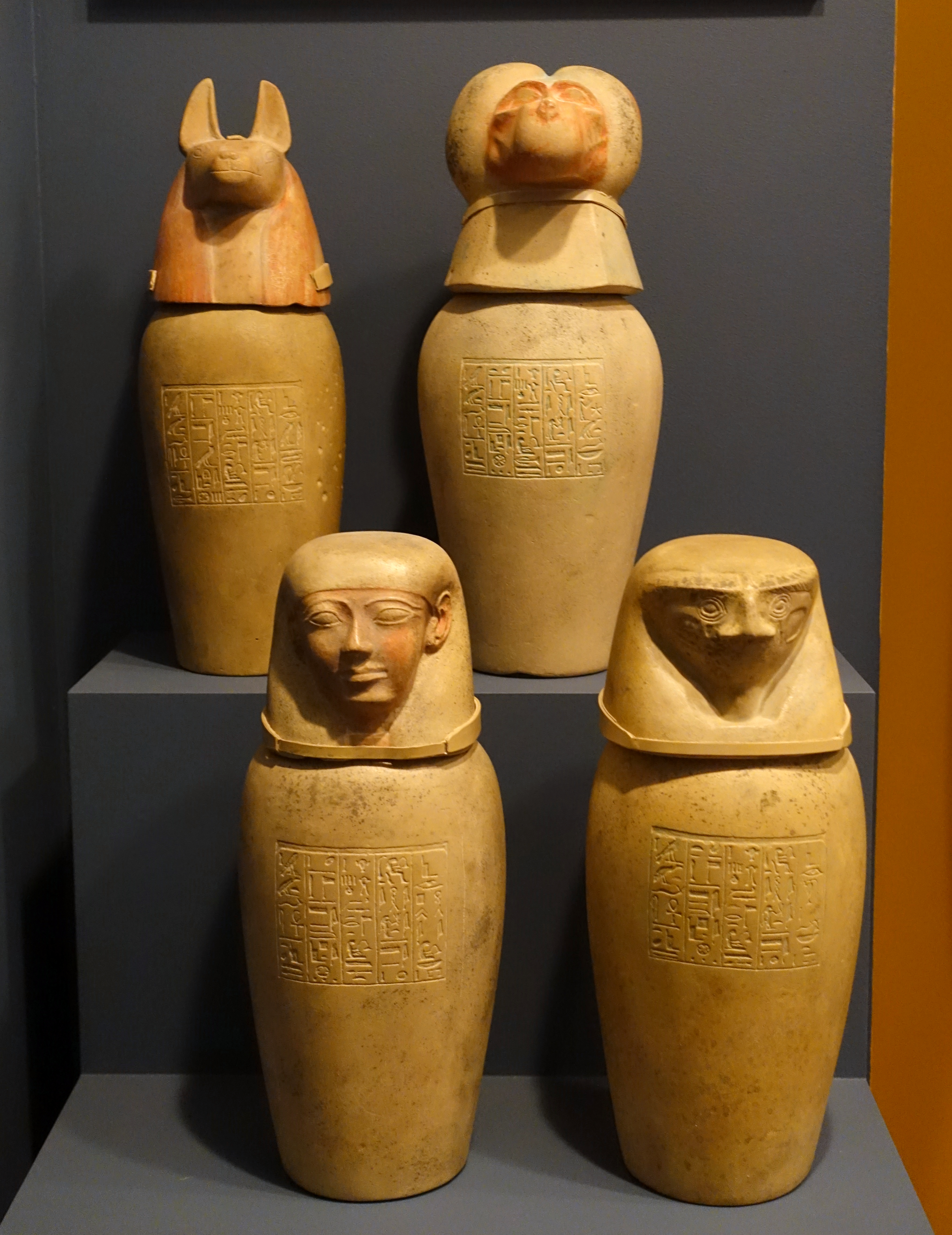
Egyptian canopic jars

Canopic jars are funerary vessels that were used by the ancient Egyptians to house embalmed organs that were removed during the mummification process. They also served to store and preserve the viscera for the afterlife.

Use of the jars dates back to the Old Kingdom and continued until the Late Period and the Ptolemaic Period, after which time the viscera were simply wrapped and placed with the body.

Over the course of ancient Egyptian history, various changes occurred in the design and style of canopic jars. Contemporaneously, canopic jars are of interest for scientific and medical research.

Cinerary urns – for holding the ashes of cremated persons – with a head-shaped lid, also sometimes called "canopic", were used by the Etruscan civilization. Though these vessels are sometimes referred to as "canopic urns" or "canopic jars", their purpose and use differ from the ancient Egyptian use.

== Etymology ==
The term canopic reflects the mistaken association by early Egyptologists with the Greek legend of Canopus – the boat captain of Menelaus on the voyage to Troy – "who was buried at Canopus in the Delta where he was worshipped in the form of a jar". In alternative versions, the name derives from the location Canopus (now Abu Qir) in the western Nile Delta near Alexandria, where human-headed jars were worshipped as personifications of the god Osiris.

== Purpose and Use ==
The practice of evisceration began early in the Old Kingdom, but the use of canopic jars as storage for the organs was not well established until the First Intermediate Period.

During mummification, the lungs, liver, stomach, and intestines were removed from the corpse to prevent putrefaction of the body. Each organ was salted in natron and placed respectively into one of four canopic jars. Since the ancient Egyptians believed it to be the seat of the soul, the heart was notably not removed in the process of mummification and no canopic jars were made for it. (Note: In the afterlife, it was believed, the heart would be weighed against the feather of Ma'at (truth) by the god Anubis. If it was too heavy from bad deeds it would be fed to a monster, Ammit, that was believed to be part lion, part hippopotamus, and part crocodile.)

Some canopic jars from the Old Kingdom were found empty and damaged, even in undisturbed tombs, suggesting that canopic jars may have been used symbolically in the burial ritual rather than physically being used to hold the organs.

Ancient Egyptians in the Third Intermediate Period and beyond adopted a similar symbolic practice. Improved embalming techniques made it unnecessary to remove viscera from the body. Although the inclusion of canopic jars remained an important aspect of ancient Egyptian burial practices, they were no longer hollowed out for storing the organs. Instead of using the traditional, full-sized, canopic jars, much smaller dummy jars were placed in the tombs.

== Design ==
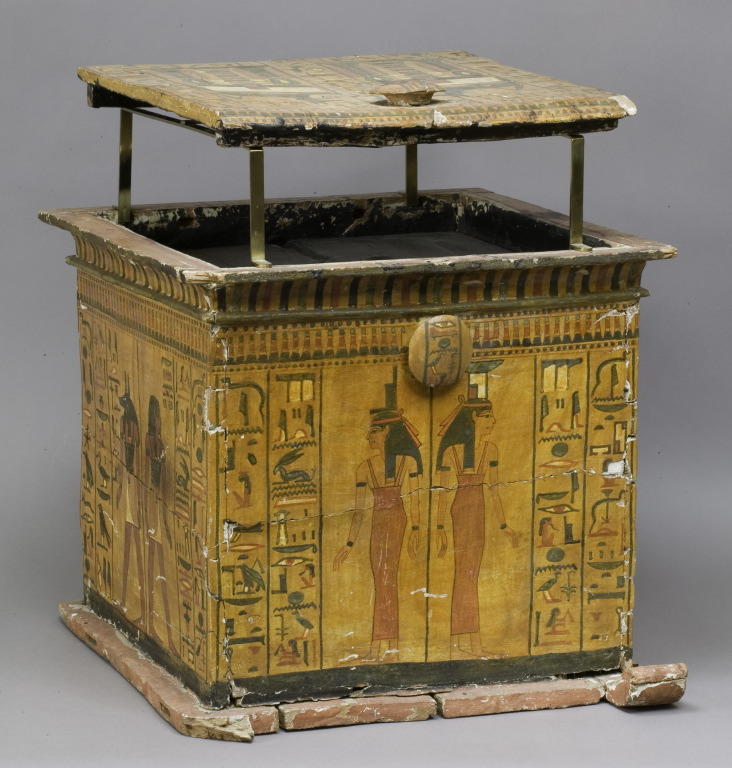
Canopic chest of Khonsu, 19th Dynasty, New Kingdom

Canopic jars are "V"-shaped vessels that have been hollowed out in the middle and topped with either plain or iconographic stoppers. They range in height from about 14 to 50 cm (5.5 to 20 in), including the lid, and in diameters of anywhere from 6 to 20 cm (2.4 to 7.9 in). The most common materials used to make the jars include wood, limestone, faience, and clay, and the design was occasionally accompanied by painted-on facial features, names of the deceased or the gods, and/or burial spells. Early canopic jars were placed inside a canopic chest and buried in tombs together with the sarcophagus of the dead. Later, they were sometimes arranged in rows beneath the bier, or at the four corners of the chamber.

The earliest and most common versions of canopic jars were made of stone, but later styles were carved from wood. Old Kingdom canopic jars were rarely inscribed and had a plain lid. By the Middle Kingdom inscriptions became more common, and the lids were often in the form of human heads. By the Nineteenth Dynasty, each of the four lids depicted one of the four sons of Horus, who acted as guardians for the respective organs in each jar.

=== Old Kingdom Canopic jars ===
The original style of the jars from the Old Kingdom was carved from smooth stone materials, usually limestone, and was paired with an equally smooth and unadorned round stopper. Towards the end of the Old Kingdom period, the use of canopic jars became more widespread, and the variety in design and style of the funerary vessels became more common, including some canopic jars made of pottery, rather than stone.

=== Human-headed Canopic jars ===
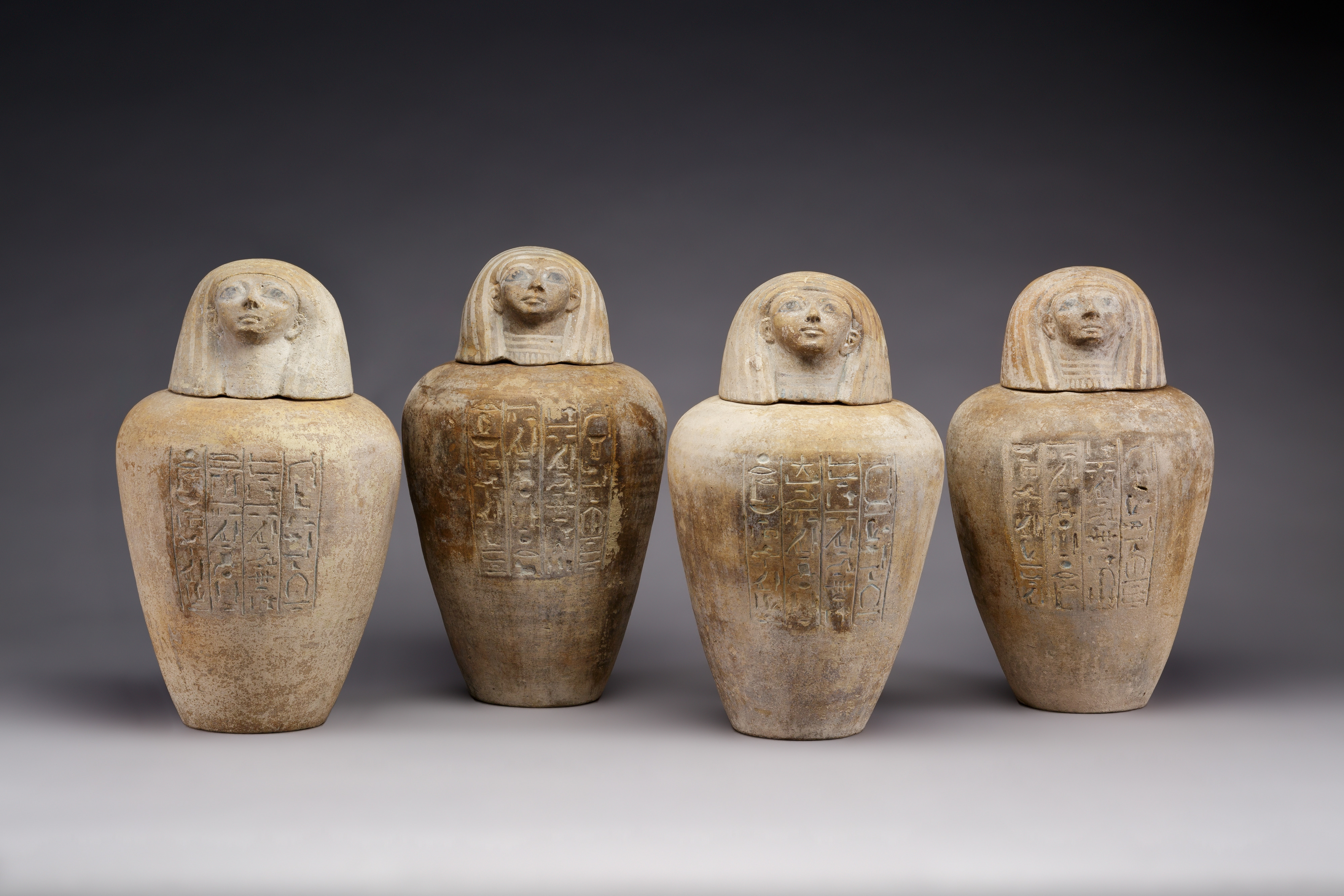
Canopic jars with human heads

It was not until the First Intermediate Period that stoppers in the shape of human heads became prevalent. The human heads represented the iconized embodiments of the four sons of Horus in their human form and were the predominant styling for the jars through ancient Egypt until the New Kingdom in the Nineteenth Dynasty.

=== New Kingdom Canopic jars ===
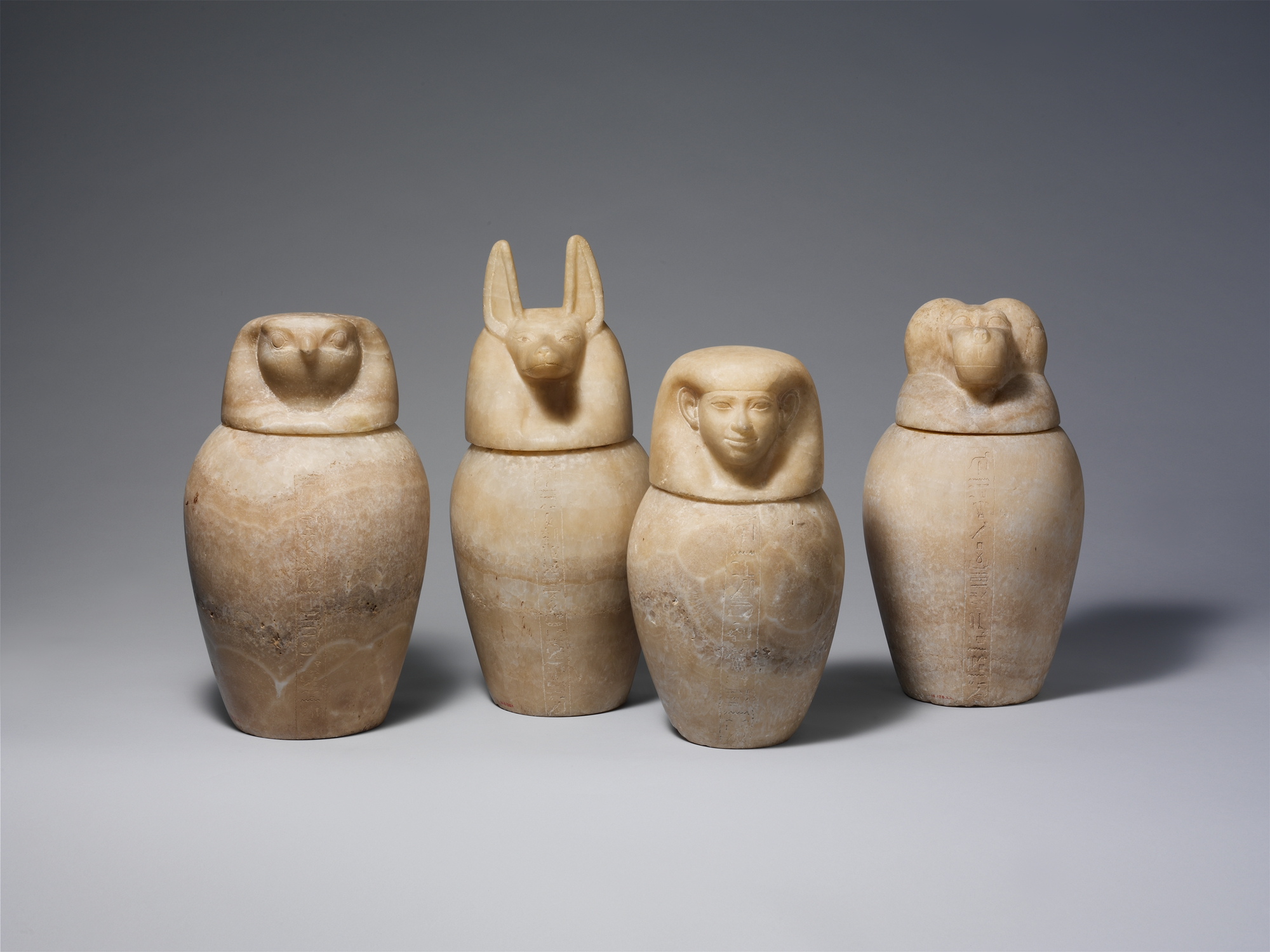
Late Period canopic jars

During the New Kingdom period, the style of canopic jars transitioned to the more well-known depiction of animal heads. Many higher-quality sets from this period were crafted from minerals such as alabaster, aragonite, calcareous stone, and blue or green glazed porcelain.

== Religious significance ==
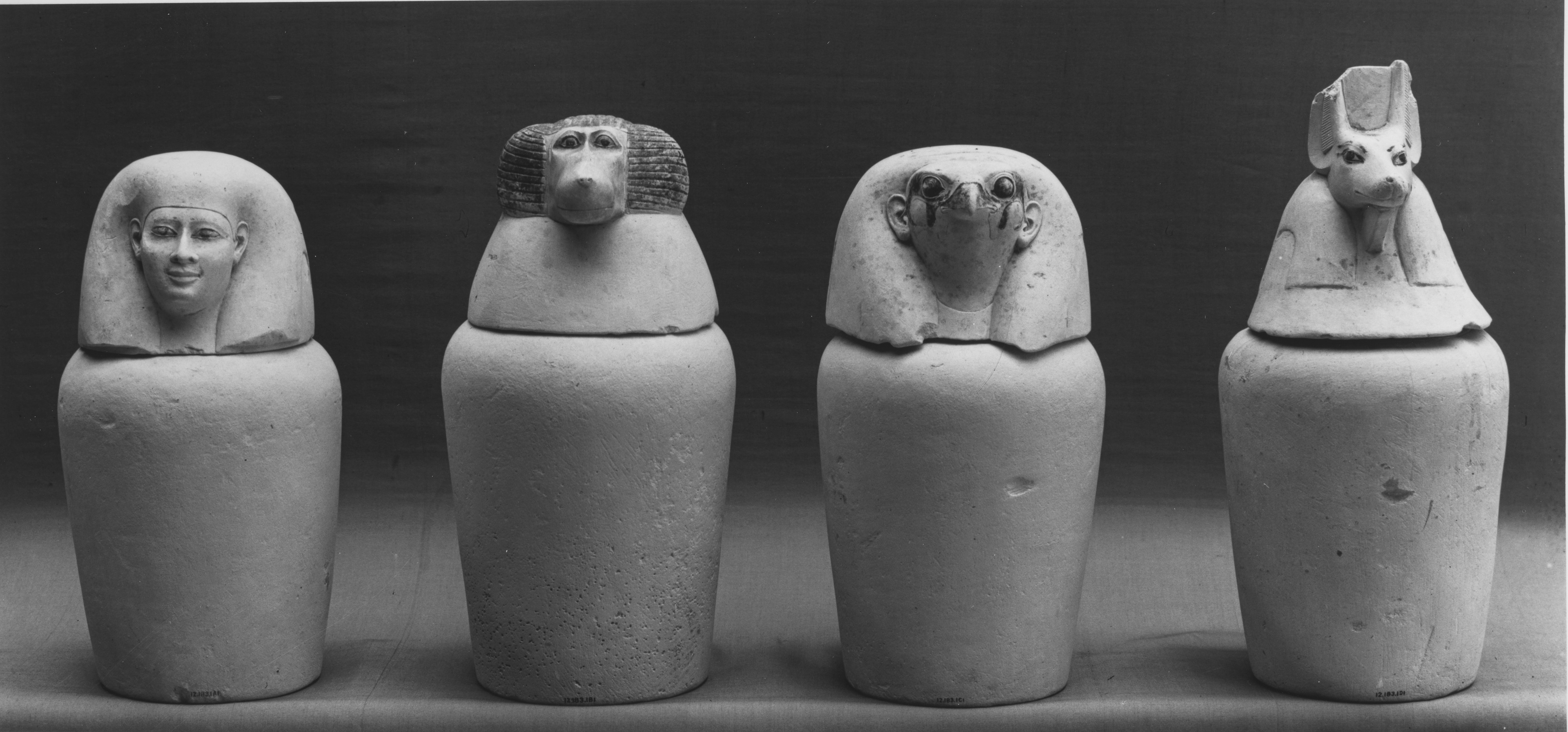
Canopic jars

Following the Nineteenth Dynasty, canopic jars were stylistically carved to represent the four sons of Horus. Each of Horus's sons, along with a companion goddess, was responsible for protecting a particular organ and represented a cardinal direction:

- Hapi: the baboon-headed god representing the North was protected by the goddess Nephthys and was assigned to the lungs;
- Duamutef: the jackal-headed god representing the East was protected by the goddess Neith and was assigned to the stomach;
- Imseti: the human-headed god representing the South was protected by the goddess Isis and was assigned to the liver;
- Qebehsenuef: the falcon-headed god representing the West was protected by the goddess Serket and was assigned to the intestines.

== Variations in archaeological evidence ==
=== Didibastet ===
In 2020, various news articles announced that excavations at Saqqara showed that a woman called Didibastet, whose 2,600-year-old undisturbed tomb was discovered behind a stone wall, was entombed with six canopic jars instead of the traditional four. A CT scan revealed that the jars contain human tissue, suggesting that the addition of extra canopic jars during Didibastet's mummification was possibly the result of a specific request.

=== Canopic jar repairs ===
Old Kingdom canopic jars from the fifth dynasty showed evidence of damage, and subsequent repairs were made to the structure of the vessels at some point in antiquity. Gypsum or plaster materials were used to mend the damage and patch breaks. Despite showing obvious signs of wear and repair, these canopic jars were still entombed with the mummy.

== Research and study ==
Because of the uniqueness of their contents, canopic jars are of particular interest to scientists and bioarchaeologists. They present a unique opportunity to study the biology of ancient Egyptians. Particular interest has focused on the possibility of pathogen research from visceral remains, although many challenges exist, making extensive research difficult to pursue.

=== DNA analysis ===
Research has been conducted into the feasibility of DNA analysis of visceral contents of canopic jars. Researchers have hoped to find more information on pathogens or diseases that may have been prevalent in ancient Egypt. Such studies have generally been unsuccessful due to a substantial lack of viable DNA.

=== Imaging studies ===
Imaging studies have been conducted on canopic jars, including CT scans, MRI, and X-ray scans to better view and understand the process of mummification in relation to the organs removed and the possible medical information to be learned from the viscera stored in canopic jars.

== Etruscan cinerary urns ==
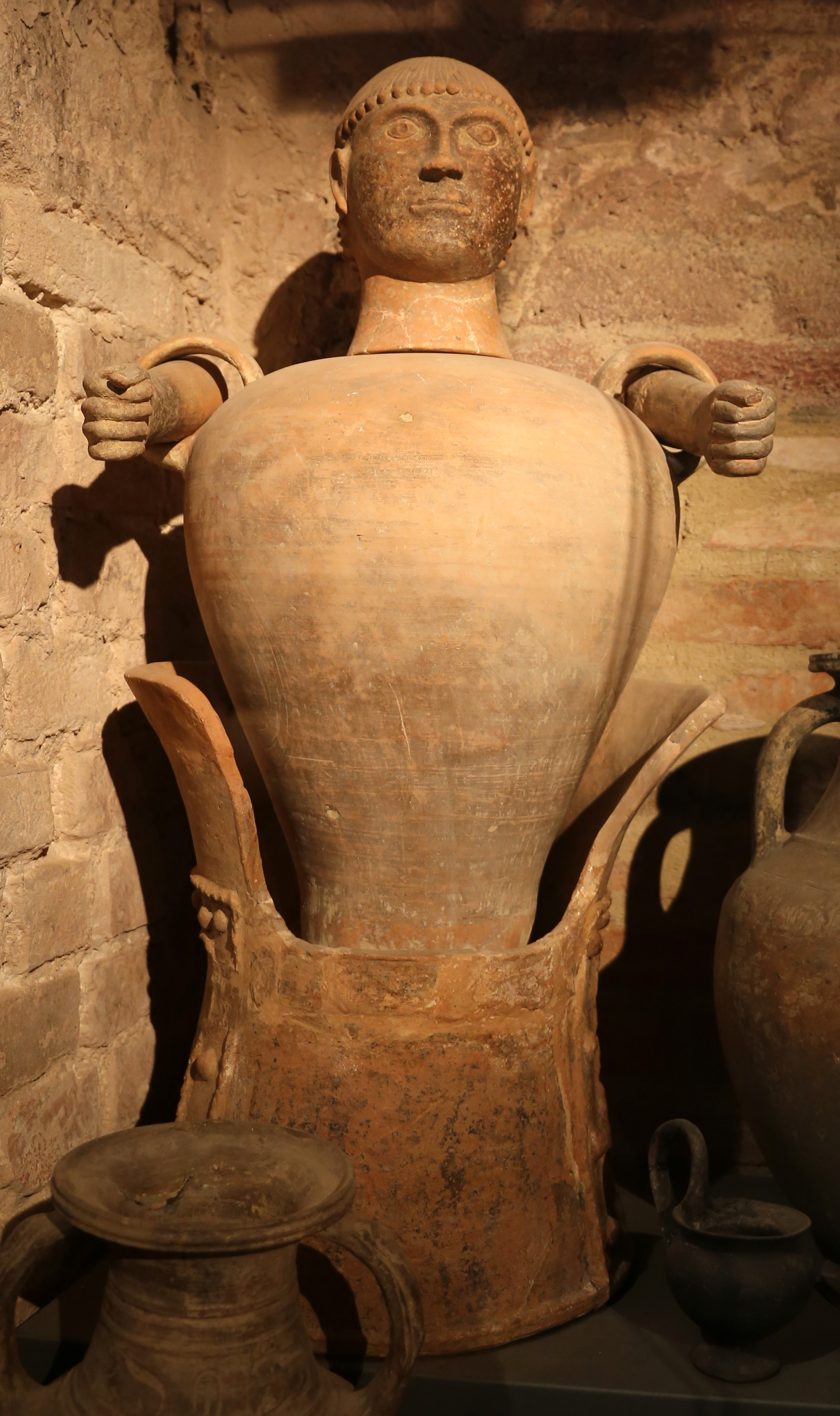
Etruscan cinerary urn

Since the Villanovan era, the ashes of some high-ranking Etruscan deceased were placed into urns which, almost as if to evoke physical integrity after cremation, were covered with a helmet. This also helped distinguish one burial from another.

During the 7th century BCE, this practice developed in Chiusi and its surrounding territory with the creation of ossuaries made from a globular bronze vase, placed on a throne and in front of a symbolic table (trapeza), as if to depict the deceased during a banquet, surrounded by symbols of power and social status. The earliest examples had a hemispherical dome-shaped lid, known as a "champagne cork" type, which in some cases featured rudimentary facial features.

Towards the end of the century, this representation became even more explicit, with the lid taking the shape of a face and, in more advanced examples, evolving into a fully sculpted head, sometimes featuring holes where hair, beards, and earrings could be inserted. Etruscologists later referred to this form as "canopic jars" due to its resemblance to Egyptian ones, though its function was entirely different—not for holding viscera but for containing cremated remains. This burial style remained in use until the 6th century BCE.

In the most elaborate examples, the funerary urns included additional anthropomorphic elements such as arms (sometimes attached separately) and breasts in the case of female canopic urns. However, it would be inaccurate to consider them true portraits, as their physical features were fairly standardized and reduced to a few typologies. Their purpose was to provide a general identification of the deceased rather than a faithful reproduction of their appearance.

== See also ==
- Jar burial
- Art of ancient Egypt § Funerary art
- Ushabti

== Bibliography ==
- Budge, Sir Edward Wallis (2010) [1925]. The mummy; a handbook of Egyptian funerary archaeology. New York: Cambridge University Press. ISBN 978-1-108-01825-8.
- David, A. Rosalie (1999). Handbook to Life in Ancient Egypt. Oxford: Oxford University Press. ISBN 0-8160-3312-9.
- Gadalla, Moustafa (2001). Egyptian Divinities – The All who are The One. Greensboro, N.C.: Tehuti Research Foundation. ISBN 1-931446-04-0.
- Murray, Margaret A. (2004) [1963]. The Splendor that was Egypt. Mineola, N.Y: Dover. ISBN 978-0-486-43100-0.
- Shaw, Ian; Paul Nicholson (1995). The Dictionary of Ancient Egypt. New York: Harry N. Abrams. ISBN 0-8109-9096-2.
- Spencer, A. Jeffrey, ed. (2007). The British Museum Book of Ancient Egypt. London: British Museum Press. ISBN 978-0-7141-1975-5.
- Laemmel, Sabine. "Clay Canopic Jars: An Example from TT23 and Its Typological and Historical Context." And the Earth ıs Joyous, Essays in Honour of Galina A. Belova, (Eds. SV Ivanov-EG Tolmacheva), CES RAS (2015): 153-175.
- Elkrim, Abd; Gamil, Ehab (January 1, 2024). "Three Canopic Jars from El-Matariya in the Grand Egyptian Museum (GEM 4964, 4967, 19335)". Shedet. 12 (12): 213–243. doi:10.21608/shedet.2023.174603.1153. ISSN 2356-8704.
