= Dramatic Ramesseum Papyrus =

Twelfth Dynasty Egyptian papyrus with text and drawings for the Senusret I Coronation

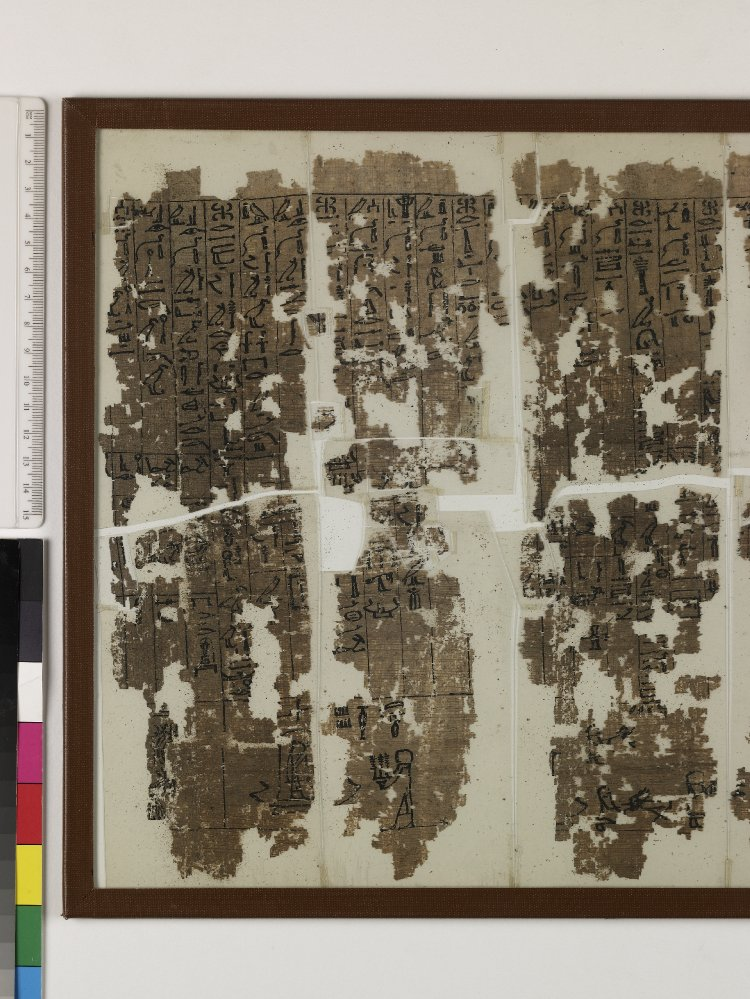
- Created: c. 1980 BC
- Discovered: Luxor, Luxor Governorate, Egypt
- Present location: British Museum, England, United Kingdom

The Dramatic Ramesseum Papyrus (also known simply as the Ramesseum Papyrus) is the oldest known surviving illustrated papyrus roll. It contains a ceremonial play celebrating the coronation or the Sed festival performed for Senusret I of the 12th Dynasty. It is dated to around 1980 BC. It was discovered in the Ramesseum, from which it gets its name. The text of the roll is in linear hieroglyphs written in narrow, vertical columns. The text occupies the top four-fifths of the scroll and the illustrations the bottom. The scenes are arranged in a manner similar to a modern comic strip with the King, in the role of Horus, appearing multiple times. Scenes are divided from each other by vertical lines. The papyrus is now preserved at the British Museum.
