= Syenogranite =

Intrusive igneous rock

- Igneous rock

Syenogranite is a fine to coarse grained intrusive rock of the same general composition as granite. For example, the syenogranite in the Salmon Mountains in Idaho is pink to tan and composed of 45–55% alkali feldspar, 15–20% plagioclase, 15–20% quartz, 5–8% biotite, 3–5% hornblende, and accessory magnetite (Evans and Green, 2003).

Syenogranite is similar to syenite. Some syenogranite contain hornblende, while also contain biotite, plagioclase (An_{3}), and quartz. (Mafti, 2001). It is in the Sao Jose do Campestre Massif in Brazil (Benjamin et al., 1998).

== See also ==
- syenite
- monzogranite
- granite
