= Canopic chest =

Ancient Egyptian case for internal organs

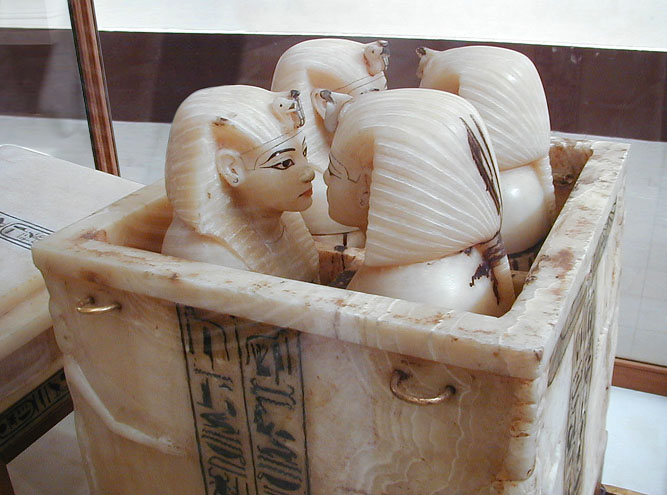
Tutankhamun's canopic chest. Egyptian Museum, Cairo.

Canopic chests are cases used by ancient Egyptians to contain the internal organs removed during the process of mummification. Once canopic jars began to be used in the late Fourth Dynasty, the jars were placed within canopic chests. Although the first proven canopic burials date from the Fourth Dynasty reign of Sneferu, there is evidence to suggest that there were canopic installations at Saqqara dating from the Second Dynasty.

== Connections to Ancient Egyptian culture ==
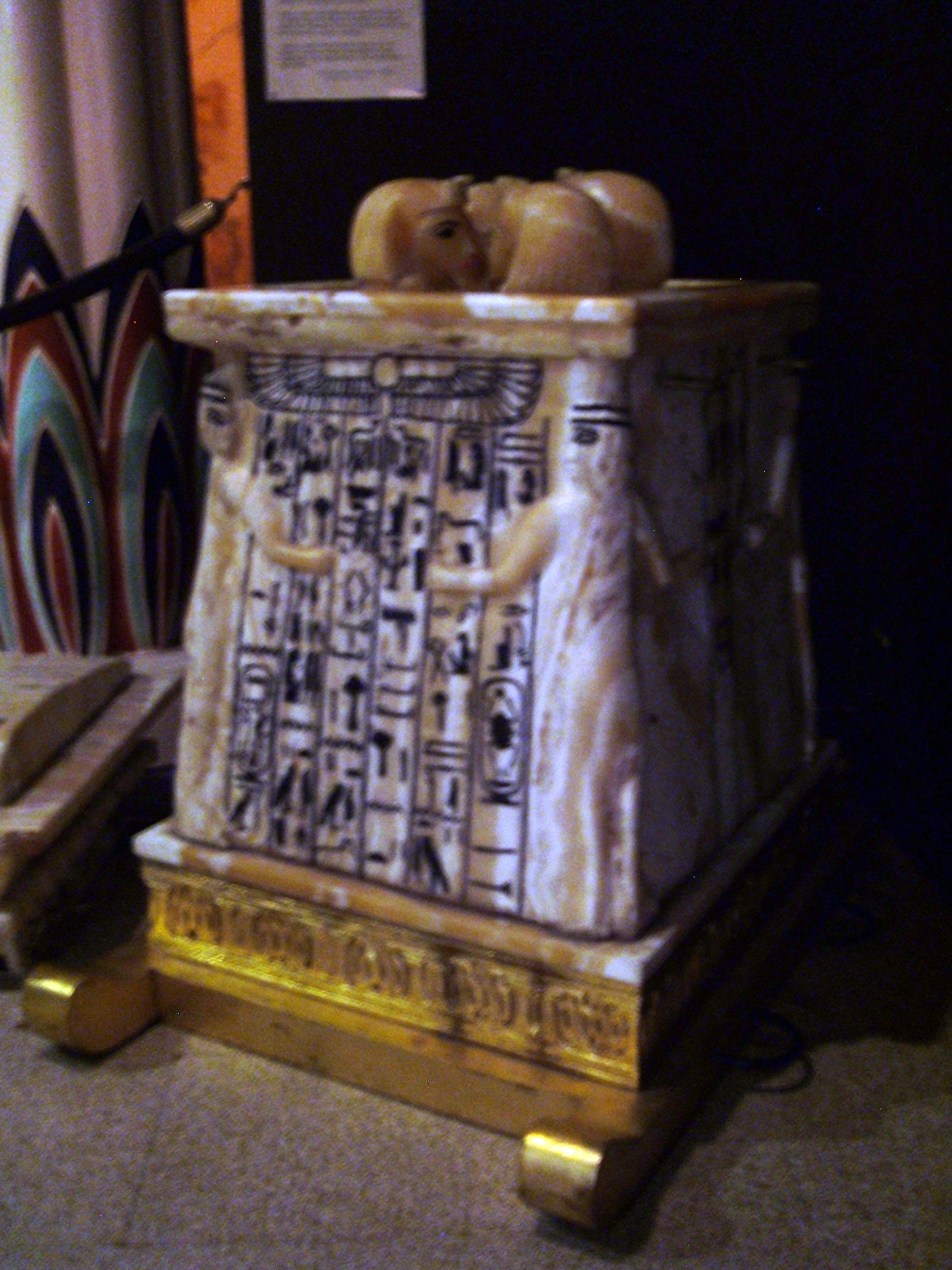
Replica of Tutankhamun's canopic chest on display at the Rosicrucian Egyptian Museum

The canopic chest personified as seen in the Papyrus of Ani

Canopic chests had an important place in Egyptian culture. Canopic chests contained the internal organs (viscera) of mummies, so they relate to the Egyptian belief that the afterlife is just as important as life on earth. Egyptians believed that everything had to be perfectly preserved to journey into the land after life and as part of the mummification process they removed viscera from the body.

== Changes through history ==
The first canopic chests were simple and wooden, but as time went on they became more elaborate. Then, around the 21st Dynasty (1069–945 BCE), the Egyptians decided to leave the viscera inside mummies. But because they had been using canopic chests for thousands of years they kept putting them in tombs, just without anything in them. Canopic chests fell out of use during the Ptolemaic Kingdom.

== Style and materials ==
Painted canopic chest and stela in the Grand Egyptian Museum

The style and materials were different at different times, though always reflected the Egyptian ideal of perfectly measured and precise beauty.

=== Ptolemaic period ===
The tall wooden shrine-like chests had bright paintings on their sides and a falcon crouching on top. Craftsmen coated the wood with gesso to prepare it for the pigment they later painted it with. The decorations are derived from ancient Egyptian religion. The falcon on top represents Sokar, a funerary god. The sides depict the chest’s owner worshipping Osiris, god of the afterlife; Ra-Horakhty, a combination of the gods Horus and Ra; four sons of Horus, each of whom guards one of the viscera traditionally removed during mummification; the dyed pillar, which represents Osiris, and the tyet, which represents Isis. The painting is not as perfectly measured and precise as earlier Egyptian art, because Egyptian civilization was decaying when it was made.

== Bibliography ==
- Shaw, Ian (2003). The Oxford History of Ancient Egypt. Oxford University Press. ISBN 978-0-19-280458-7.
- Green, Roger Lancelyn (1964). Ancient Egypt. J. Day Co.
- Grimal, Nicholas (1992). A History of Ancient Egypt. Blackwell Publishing. ISBN 978-0-631-19396-8.
