= Amenherkhepshef (disambiguation) =

Amenherkhepshef ("Amun is with His Strong Arm") or variant spellings may refer to:

- Amun-her-khepeshef (died c. 1254 BC), also known by distinguishing name Amun-her-khepeshef A, son of Pharaoh Ramesses II and Queen Nefertari, buried in KV5 in the Valley of the Kings
- Amun-her-khepeshef (20th dynasty), also known by distinguishing name Amun-her-khepeshef B, eldest son and heir of Pharaoh Ramesses III, buried in QV55 in the Valley of the Queens
- Ramesses VI, princely name Amenherkhepshef, or distinguishing name Amenherkhepshef C, the fifth pharaoh of the 20th Dynasty of Egypt
- Amenherkhepshef (mid 12th century BC during the 20th Dynasty), also known by distinguishing name Amenherkhepshef D, son of Ramesses VI with Queen Nubkhesbed, buried in KV13 in the Valley of the Kings
- Amun-Her-Khepesh-Ef (c. 1885 BC – c. 1883 BC), the supposed son of Pharaoh Senusret III and Hathorhotep, interred in Egypt and cremated in the U.S. in 1950. His final resting place is in Middlebury, Vermont
