= Sobekneferu =

Earliest confirmed female Egyptian pharaoh c. 1800 BC

- Neferusobek; Greek: Σκεμίοφρις, romanized: Skemiophris
- Statue of Sobekneferu (Berlin ÄM 14475) which was lost during World War II

Pharaoh
- Reign: 3 years, 10 months, and 24 days according to the Turin Canon in the 18th century BC (Note: Proposed dates for the reign of Sobekeneferu: c. 1812–1809 BC, c. 1805–1802 BC, c. 1805–1801 BC, c. 1799–1795 BC, c. 11/12 March 1798/1797–29 January 1794/1793 BC, c. 1790–1786 BC, c. 1790–1785 BC, c. 1789–1786 BC (HC), c. 1787–1783 BC, c. 1785–1782 BC, c. 1785–1781 BC, c. 1782–1778 BC, c. 1777–1773 BC, c. 1763–1760 BC, c. 1763–1759 BC (LC), c. 1760–1755 BC.)
- Predecessor: Amenemhat IV
- Successor: Sobekhotep I or Wegaf
Royal titulary
Horus name
mryt-rꜥ
Meryt-re
Beloved of Re
G5 X1	N5 U6 M17 M17 X1
G5 X1	N5 Z1 U6 X1
Nebty name
sꜣt-sḫm-nbt-tꜣwy
Sat-sekhem-nebet-tawy
The daughter of the powerful one is Mistress of the Two Lands
G16	X1 G39 S42 V30 X1 N16 N16
Golden Horus
ḏdt-ḫꜥw
Djedet-khau
Stable of appearances
G8	X1 R11 N28 G43 S12
Prenomen
kꜣ-sbk-rꜥ / sbk-kꜣ-rꜥ
Ka-sobek-re / Sobek-ka-re
The ka of Sobek-Re
or
Sobek is the ka of Re

M23 X1 L2 X1	N5 I4 D28
Nomen
sbk-nfrw
Sobek-neferu / Neferu-sobek
Beauty of Sobek

H_SPACE X1 G39 N5	F35 F35 F35 I5A
sbk-šdt-nfrw
Sobek-shedet-neferu
Beauty of Sobek, lord of Shedyt

H_SPACE X1 G39 N5	I5A F30 X1 F35 F35 F35
- Consort: Amenemhat IV?
- Children: Sobekhotep I (possibly)
- Father: Amenemhat III?
- Mother: Unknown
- Burial: See Burial
- Dynasty: Twelfth Dynasty

Sobekneferu or Neferusobek (Egyptian: 𓄤𓄤𓄤𓆍, romanized: Sbk-nfrw, lit. 'Beauty of Sobek') was the first confirmed queen regnant (or 'female king') of ancient Egypt and the last pharaoh of the Twelfth Dynasty and of the Middle Kingdom. Her reign was brief, lasting three years, 10 months, and 24 days according to the Turin Canon in the 18th century BC. She distinguished herself from any potential prior female rulers by adopting the full royal titulary which was often modified to acknowledge her womanhood such as by the titles 'daughter of Re' and 'female Horus'. She was also the first ruler to associate with the crocodile god Sobek in her nomen and prenomen.

Sobekneferu ascended to the throne following the death of Amenemhat IV, her presumed brother and husband, albeit the relationship is unsubstantiated. The reasons for her accession are debated. One possibility is that her predecessor had no male heir to bestow the throne to, thus leaving his sister to take the mantle of king. Yet, there are two candidate sons and Thirteenth Dynasty kings, Sobekhotep I and Sonbef, that may have filiative nomina stating that they are 'Amenemhat's son'. If Amenemhat IV is meant, then it may be that she usurped the throne from them, perhaps because she perceived them to be illegitimate. She also never associated herself with Amenemhat IV, instead asserting her legitimacy through their presumptive father, Amenemhat III. It appears though, that Sokebhotep I modelled his prenomen after Sobekneferu's Nebty name, indicating that he may have sought legitimacy from his predecessor and also demonstrating the esteem she was held in.

Contemporary evidence from her reign is scant. There are a few partial statues – one with her face, now lost – and a small corpus of seals and inscriptions that have been preserved. These mainly originate from Faiyum where she is credited with the completion of 'the Labyrinth' – the mortuary temple of Amenemhat III's pyramid at Hawara. One important inscription is a graffito recording the level of the Nile inundation at the fortress at Kumma in her third regnal year indicating that she maintained authority across Egypt. Her funerary monument remains unidentified, though a papyrus discovered in Harageh mentions a site called Sekhem Sobekneferu which may refer to it, and there is a storeroom administrator attested to on a stela providing evidence of an active funerary cult. Her rule is also attested to on several later king lists from the Thutmosid and Ramesside periods and in Manetho's Aegyptiaca.

== Family ==
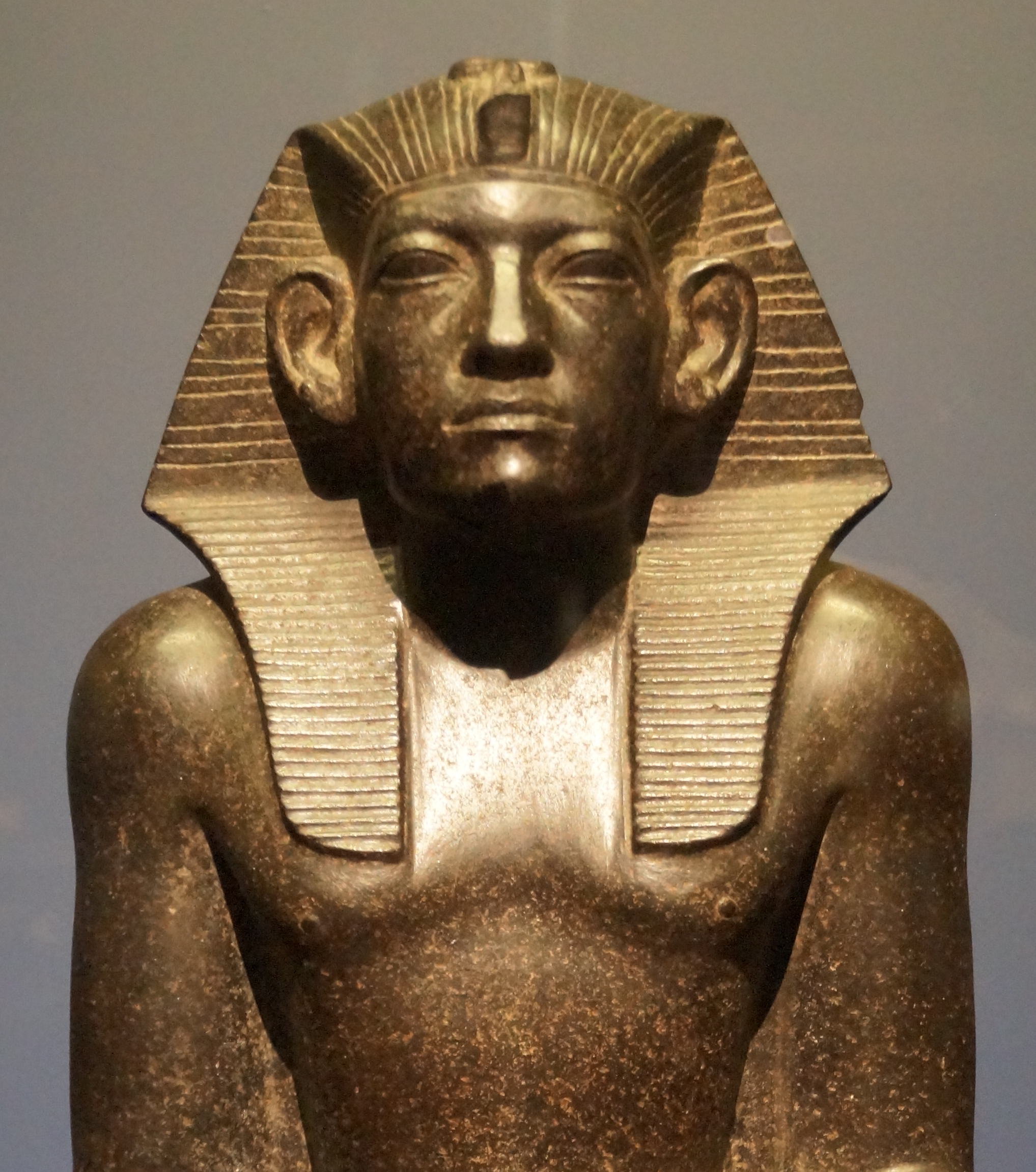
Statue of Amenemhat III (Pushkin 4757), presumed father of Sobekneferu

The link between Amenemhat III and his two successors, Amenemhat IV and Sobekneferu, is uncertain, though they are usually presumed to be his son and daughter. Amenemhat III had two known wives, Aat and Khenemetneferhedjet III, who died early in his reign and were buried in his first pyramid at Dahshur. (Note: The burials of three other princesses – Hathorhotep, Nubhotepet, and Sithathor – were found at the Dahshur complex, but it is unclear whether these princesses were his daughters as the complex was used for royal burials throughout the Thirteenth Dynasty.) He had a daughter, Neferuptah, who was provided a burial at his second pyramid at Hawara, but was actually interred in her own pyramid. She bore only one filiative title of sꜣ.t-nsw (Note: king's daughter) and no indicator of royal marriage of ḥm.t-nsw. (Note: king's wife) The enclosure of Neferuptah's name in a cartouche is significant and may indicate that she was groomed for the throne. (Note: Neferutah was the very first woman to have her name enclosed like this.) The mother of Amenemhat IV, Hetepti, is attested in an inscription from Medinet Madi and is presumed to be a wife of Amenemhat III. The identity of Sobekneferu's mother is unknown, though either Aat or Khenemetneferhedjet III are candidates.

The identification of Amenemhat IV as progeny has been contested. Kim Ryholt has proposed that Amenemhat IV is of non-royal lineage because his mother, Hetepti, only has the title of mw.t-nsw (Note: king's mother) and not of ḥm.t-nsw as well. Aidan Dodson and Dyan Hilton note that while Amenemhat IV does refer to Amenemhat III as his father in inscriptions, this may simply be referring to him as a predecessor, and also note the lack of the ḥm.t-nsw title for Hetepti. It is also possible that Amenemhat IV was a grandson instead. The relationship between Amenemhat IV and Sobekneferu is also unclear. The ancient historian Manetho in Aegyptiaca states that they were brother and sister. This filial identification is the norm and there is speculation on a potential marriage between them. There is no contemporary evidence for this as neither sn.t-nsw (Note: king's sister) nor ḥm.t-nsw are attested for Sobekneferu.

Sobekneferu's accession may have been motivated by a lack of a male heir for Amenemhat IV; though there are two kings of the Thirteenth Dynasty, Amenemhat [Sa] Sobekhotep (Sobekhotep I) and Amenemhat [Sa] Senebef (Sonbef), that may bear filiative nomen of ỉmn-m-hꜣt [sꜣ] (Note: Amenemhat's son) indicating they may be his sons. (Note: Ryholt's filial interpretation does not have universal acceptance. Stephen Quirke proposes that these should be read as 'double names', a feature common to the period.) Ryholt suggests that Sobekneferu may have taken the throne following Amenemhat IV's death because she perceived them to be illegitimate. Barbara Bell proposes that Sobekhotep I may have been a son of Amenemhat III from a secondary queen that legitimately ascended the throne following Sobekneferu. Julien Siesse and Robyn Gillam note that Sobekhotep I's prenomen sḫm-rꜥ-ḫw-tꜣwy (Note: The powerful one of Re is Protector of the Two Lands) bears a distinct resemblance to Sobekneferu's Nebty name sꜣt-sḫm-nbt-tꜣwy (Note: Siesse also noted a similarity between the Horus name of Sekhemrekhutawy Khabaw (whom Siesse identifies with Sobekhotep I) ḫꜥ-bꜣw with that of Amenemhat III's ꜥꜣ-bꜣw.) (Note: The daughter of the powerful one is Mistress of the Two Lands) which Gillam additionally notes indicates that he sought legitimacy through his predecessor and simultaneously reflects the esteem she held.

== History ==
=== Late Twelfth Dynasty ===
The Middle Kingdom attained its military and economic zenithon during the reigns of Senusret III and Amenemhat III respectively. Senusret III's reign was an inflection point in the domestic and foreign policy of Egypt. On the domestic front, he reorganized the administration displacing authority away from the nomarchs and condensing it into the hands of his appointed viziers and their councils. (Note: There is debate as to whether this was a conscious effort by Senusret III to wrest power away from local governors, or moreso a consequence of centralization that occurred as officials moved to the capital and into the court of the regnant for work.) Yet, it is his foreign policy that forms the most significant component of his legacy and is defined by the military campaigns he led into Nubia and Syria–Palestine. These contributed the basis of the Greek legendary figure of Sesostris described by Manetho and Herodotus. Following 19 years of sole reign, he passed the throne to his son, Amenemhat III, with whom he seems to have shared it for a further 20 years. (Note: The topic of co-regencies during the Middle Kingdom remains fraught. Some Egyptologists obstinately refuse to entertain the idea of them, while others treat their existence as settled fact. The issue has thus occupied a substantial fraction of academic discourse on chronological issues for the period.) In turn, Amenemhat III presided over a peaceful Egypt enabling him to direct his attention to the economic development of the nation. His building programme spanned all of Egypt, but its nexus was at Faiyum to which he contributed two colossi of himself at Biahmu, temples to Sobek and Renenutet, a pyramid at Dahshur and another at Hawara which is most noted for its mortuary temple known by the epithet 'the Labyrinth', and expanded the agricultural potential of Lake Moeris. To provide the materials for these projects, the natural deposits of Egypt from the Sinai Peninsula to Nubia were extensively exploited. His reign lasted for at least 45 years, possibly longer, and may have ended with a coregency with his successor. Amenemhat IV ruled for nine or ten years, but there is scant information regarding his reign, and by the end of it the dynasty was in decline.

=== Accession ===
Sobekneferu ascended to the throne following Amenemhat IV. (Note: The proposition of a coregency between Sobekneferu and Amenemhat III, put forth by Percy Newberry and later Alan Gardiner, is generally rejected. Similarly, a coregency period between Sobekenefru and Amenehat IV is also unevidenced. There is no basis to assume that Sobekenferu was intended for the throne that would justify a coregency.) The reasons for the accession of a 'female king' are obscure, but may have been motivated by the lack of a male heir for Amenemhat IV or a dispute over their legitimacy. She is the earliest confirmed woman to rule over Egypt as a king and the first to adopt the full royal titulary. (Note: There is some evidence for other earlier female rulers. As early as the First Dynasty, Neithhotep has been proposed as a possible regent on the basis of a palace seal with royal insignia. In the same dynasty, Merneith may have ruled as regent for her son. In the Fifth Dynasty, Setibhor has been proposed to have been a female king based on the manner her monuments appeared to have been targeted for destruction. In the Sixth Dynasty, Nitocris is generally considered as a king, though there is little proof of her historicity and she is not mentioned prior to the Eighteenth Dynasty. The recounting of Nitocris's reign may be a Greek legend and the name may originate from an incorrect rendering of Neitiqerty Siptah.) The traditional titles preceding her names were modified to note Sobekneferu's womanhood by appending the feminine marker t to them: sꜣ.t-rꜥ; (Note: daughter of Re) ḥr.t. (Note: female Horus) Though this was an inconsistent practice that was not done to all names bỉk-nbw (Note: Golden Falcon; or ḥr-nbw Golden Horus) or even in all cases sꜣ-rꜥ. (Note: son of Re)

She was the first ruler to have a theophoric association with the crocodile god Sobek, whose identity appears in both her given nomen Sobekneferu and her chosen prenomen Sobekkare. The cult of Sobek had risen to prominence during the Twelfth Dynasty, particularly as successive kings directed their energy towards the development of Faiyum where Sobek was revered. This culminated in the incorporation of Sobek into the sun deity from whence he became a manifestation of that god as Sobek-Re in a process beginning in the Middle Kingdom and lasting through to the New Kingdom. Many of Sobekneferu's successors in the Second Intermediate Period also bore nomina invoking the god, further testifying to his elevated status. (Note: In the Thirteenth Dynasty, seven kings bore nomina invoking Sobek: Sobekhotep I, Sobekhotep II, Sobekhotep III, Sobekhotep IV, Sobekhotep V, Sobekhotep VI, and Sobekhotep VII. In the Sixteenth Dynasty a further king bore such a nomen: Sobekhotep VIII. Finally in the Seventeenth Dynasty two more kings bore such nomina: Sobekemsaf I and Sobekemsaf II.)

=== Reign ===
Her comparatively brief reign of about four years has left, much as with her predecessor, a paucity of surviving contemporary records. Her efforts were concentrated on the Faiyum region – much like Amenemhat III earlier – indicating its retained import. In Faiyum, she is credited with the completion of 'the Labyrinth' of Amenemhat III's pyramid at Hawara. A group of statues of Sobekneferu found at Tell el-Dab'a, but bearing the epithet sbk-šdt, (Note: Sobek of Shedyt) also suggest a Faiyum origin. Further south, she is attested in inscriptions from 'the temple of Kom el-Akareb' in Heracleopolis Magna. That a graffito was left at Kumma in her third year indicates that she was able to effect her authority across Egypt. No contemporary evidence has been recovered between Heracleopolis Magna and Kumma. Her funerary monument has not been positively identified. The two pyramids at Mazghuna have been proposed as potential candidates, but there is no evidence to support this assignment and they may date to the Thirteenth Dynasty. Sobekneferu's death brought a close to the Twelfth Dynasty and began the Second Intermediate Period. (Note: There is no firm consensus across Egyptologists as to whether the Middle Kingdom period concludes with the Twelfth or Thirteenth Dynasty. There is a continuation in the arts and culture following the transition between the two dynasties, but an immediate political change as the longevity of individual suzerains dissipates from decades-long to years- or months-long. Thus, academics focussing on the former subject tend to include the Thirteenth Dynasty in the Middle Kingdom, whereas those focussed on the latter subject identify it with the Second Intermediate Period.) This transition appears to have been smooth as there is no evidence to suggest a violent collapse.

=== Early Thirteenth Dynasty ===
The Second Intermediate Period is poorly understood owing to the paucity of attestations for individual rulers of the time. The early Thirteenth Dynasty was characterised by a rapid succession of ephemeral rulers, the first of whom remains debated, though the principal candidates are Khutawyre Wegaf (Wegaf) and Sekhemre Khutawy Sobekhotep (Sobekhotep I). The sheer numerosity of kingships and the brevity of their rule suggests that the throne may have been held by a rotating succession of appointees from the most influential families. This initial phase was brief owing to the exceptionally short reigns of the kings and was followed by a more stable succession with better attested rulers.

== Attestations ==
=== Contemporary ===
==== Graffiti and seals ====
Only a small collection of sources attest to Sobekneferu's rule as king of Egypt. In Nubia, a graffito (SNM 34390 / RIK 11 / No. 382) in the fortress of Kumma records the height of the Nile inundation at +1.83 m (6.0 ft) (Note: The value here is as compared against the lowest recorded level of the inundation in a graffito (SNM 34405 / RIK 8 / No. 379) during the reign of Amenemhat III in his 40th regnal year which was marked at 155.07 m (508.8 ft) above mean sea level.) during her third regnal year. Another inscription discovered in the Eastern Desert records 'year 4, second month of the Season of the Emergence'.

The British Museum has a fine cylinder seal (EA 16581) bearing her name and royal titulary in its collection. The glazed steatite seal measures 4.42 cm (1.74 in) long with a diameter of 1.55 cm (0.61 in). There is a 4.5 cm (1.8 in) long faded green faience cylinder from Faiyum in the collection of Farouk I carrying two columns of inscriptions. The first bears her name and titles and the second contains formulaic writing. There is another cylinder seal (JE 72663) from the collection of Fuad I, now in the Cairo Museum, which curiously places nsw-bỉty (Note: He of the Sedge and Bee; King of Upper and Lower Egypt) before Sobekneferu's nomen sbk-šdt-nfrw (Note: Beauty of Sobek of Shedyt) instead of her prenomen kꜣ-sbk-rꜥ. (Note: The ka of Sobek-Re; Sobek is the ka of Re) Sydney Aufrère notes that by the reign of Senusret II the kingly title had rigidified in presentation before the prenomen and proposes that Sobekneferu's may rather have been sbk-šdt-nfrw considering that there are several instances of that pairing. There is record of a further partial cylinder seal with Sobekneferu's titles in the private collection of a 'Mr. Nash from Margate'.

The British Museum also possesses an inscribed scarab (EA 66159) bearing Sobekneferu's name. The glazed steatite scarab measures 2.03 cm (0.80 in) by 1.32 cm (0.52 in) and 0.86 cm (0.34 in) in height. There is also a second scarab from the Grant Collection recorded in Historical scarabs and History by Flinders Petrie.

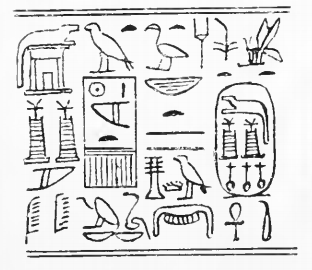
Drawing by Flinders Petrie of the cylinder seal (EA 16581) of Sobekneferu in the British Museum

==== Statuary ====
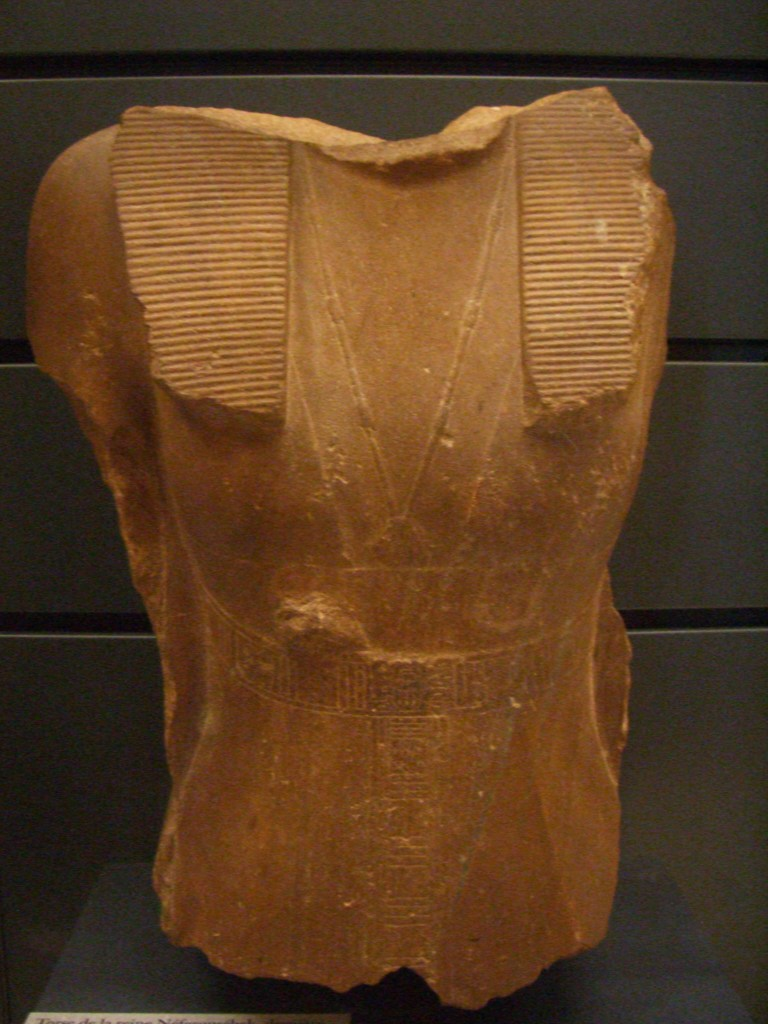
Quartzite statue of Sobekneferu (E 27135) in the Louvre

Several headless statues of Sobekneferu have been identified. One is a quartzite torso (E 27135) of an originally life-size statue, held by the Louvre in Paris. It was purchased by the Louvre Museum in 1973, but its provenance is unknown. The remnant – which is missing the head, arms, and lower body – measures 0.48 m (1 ft 7 in) vertically, 0.33 m (1 ft 1 in) frontally, and 0.215 m (8.5 in) sagitally. In its iconography it blends feminine and masculine dress: She wears the typical female sheath dress, with straps attached reaching over the shoulders and covering her breasts, over which she has a šnḏwt kilt held by an inscribed belt and a strip of apron covering the genital region usually worn by men. On her chest rests a bivalve shell pendant like those that appear on statues of Senusret III and Amenemhat III. Finally, the statue bears the royal nms, of which only the striated lappets survive, identifying the subject as a ruler. Owing to the condition of the statue it is impossible to determine the depicted pose, though it may have been the subject in prayer with her hands laid flat upon the kilt.

Three apparently life-sized basalt or greywacke statues of Sobekneferu were found in Tell el-Dab'a: Two depict her in a seated posture trampling the Nine Bows, representing the subjugation of Egypt's enemies, while the third depicts her kneeling. The two seated statues were probably originally identical, though they were severely damaged by the time of their discovery. The better preserved 0.73 m (2 ft 5 in) tall statue retains the lower half, while the less preserved 0.64 m (2 ft 1 in) tall statue has additionally lost the subject's feet and pedestal. The surviving inscriptions commend her to Sobek of Shedyt, an important centre since Amenemhat III and an indicator that they might originate from Faiyum. The kneeling statue is also partial, retaining the lower 0.85 m (2 ft 9 in) of the whole, but displays the great ability of the work's executor to capture the motion of subject: She is planted firmly upon the plinth in the ball of her feet and knees, her mass resting on her heels and hands in her lap, before an inscription run right-to-left commending her to 'Sobek of Shedyt' and 'Horus residing in Shedyt, foremost of the Palace Lake', and wishing that she, the King of the Two Lands, may live. These statues were probably moved to Tell el-Dab'a by the Hyksos during their rule. Their current location is unknown. There is also a headless black basalt, granite, or granodiorite sphinx originally discovered by Édouard Naville in Qantir bearing a damaged inscription determined to be kꜣ-sbk-rꜥ the prenomen of Sobekneferu. The sphinx's current location is also unknown.

One statuette (Berlin ÄM 14475) of Sobekneferu with her visage is known. It was bequeathed to the Egyptian Museum of Berlin by 'Dr. Deibel' in 1899 but lost during World War II, yet its existence is assured by photographs and a plaster cast made in 1905. The fragment is made of greywacke (Note: It is alternatively described as being steatite or slate.) and measures 0.09 m (3.5 in) wide by 0.062 m (2.4 in) deep and is 0.14 m (5.5 in) tall. It depicts a woman wearing a Hathor wig with a hole in her skull apparently there to receive a headdress, possibly a crown. It is uninscribed, and thus unidentifiable alone, but can be dated to the late Twelfth to Thirteenth Dynasty by its style. Biri Fay proposed the possible identification with Sobekneferu in 1988 writing '[o]ne such example, the bust of a queen of the late Middle Kingdom ... with the features of Amenemhat III, is perhaps a representation of Nofrusobek'. The upper fragment connects with the lower part of a seated statuette (MFA 24.742), discovered by George Andrew Reisner in the temple of Taharqa, of the Twenty-Fifth Dynasty, at Semna and held at the Museum of Fine Arts, Boston. The greywacke (Note: This too is described as being either steatite or slate.) lower fragment measures 0.085 m (3.3 in) wide by 0.175 m (6.9 in) deep and rising 0.214 m (8.4 in) high. It depicts a woman with her hands on her lap seated upon a throne bearing the royal symbol smꜣ tꜣwy (Note: union of the Two Lands) flanked by plants representing Upper and Lower Egypt on each side. The identity of the subject was confirmed on connecting the two pieces. The upper half depicts a woman of the Twelfth to Thirteenth Dynasty, whilst the lower half with its smꜣ tꜣwy inscription designates a seated pharaoh, which in combination leaves a single potential candidate: Sobekneferu.

==== Architecture ====
Sobekneferu invariably related herself to Amenemhat III, suggesting that she was a royal daughter, whilst never mentioning her predecessor Amenemhat IV, indicating they may have only been step-siblings and that his mother may not have been a member of the royal family. One such association comes from a limestone block (LDUCE-UC 14337) from 'the Labyrinth' of the pyramid at Hawara bearing both Amenemhat III and Sobekneferu's names that also contains the only known reference to a goddess Dḥdḥt. Further inscriptions from Hawara include: Three blocks (including Berlin 1164) found by Karl Richard Lepsius containing fragmentary cartouches reconstructed with Sobekneferu's name, a granite block discovered by Flinders Petrie bearing no name, but connected to Sobekneferu by its content which reads '... her monument to her father forever', (Note: It is open to interpretation whether 'her father' refers to Amenemhat III or to a god.) and a 0.4 m (1 ft 4 in) section of an up to 7 m (23 ft 0 in) tall red granite column bearing the serekhs of Amenemhat III and Sobekneferu with a Horus falcon atop each. The Horus of Amenemhat III carries a composite of an ꜥnḫ sign and ḏd pillar, representing life and stability respectively, that it presents to the Horus of Sobekneferu. This imagery indicates that Amenemhat III was deified before the column was built and reflects Sobekneferu's intent to legitimise her reign by securing his favour. The evidence from Hawara suggests that 'the Labyrinth' was completed during Sobekneferu's reign. By contrast, Amenemhat IV's name does not appear at Hawara and with the exception of the temple of Renenutet at Medinet Madi he is unattested in the Faiyum region.

The Staatliche Museen zu Berlin possesses an alabaster fragment (Berlin 38/66) acquired in 1966 that bears the names of Amenemhat III and Sobekneferu enclosed in rectangles and in association with Sobek. The provenance of this item is unknown, but it too may originally have come from Hawara. Marco Zecchi comments that the contents of the inscription suggest a dual purpose to draw a connection between Sobekneferu and Amenemhat III via Sobek and then to employ the god's authority over Egypt, shown by his title ḥqꜣ idbwy, (Note: ruler of the Two Banks) to grant legitimacy to Sobekneferu as Amenemat III's successor.

There is evidence that she built in Heracleopolis Magna from a destroyed 'temple of Kom el-Akareb', south of the temple of Haryshef, which remains unidentified. It appears to be oriented towards the pyramid of Senusret II which may indicate a Middle Kingdom origin. The portico of this temple is partially preserved. In 1915, Georges Daressy discovered a pair of colossi that Ramesses II – and later Merneptah – had appropriated from an earlier Twelfth Dynasty pharaoh – potentially Senusret III, based on a third colossus from this king that was found in 2011, or Amenemhat IV. Whilst excavating, Daressy found a red granite architrave bearing Sobekneferu's names reused in the temple's pillars. Four more granite papyriform columns bear Sobekneferu's inscriptions, while a further ten granite beams may originate from the same source.

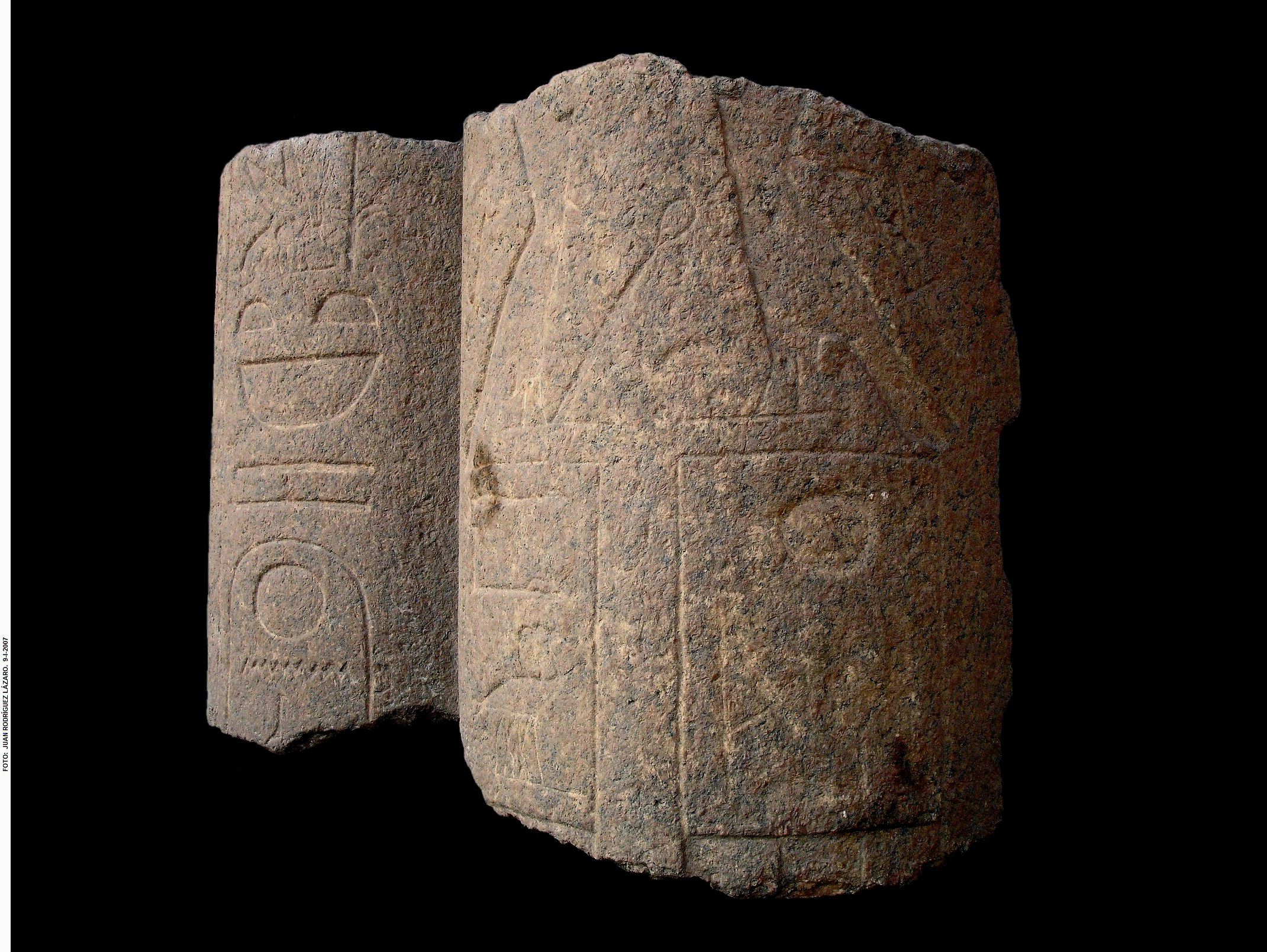
Fragmentary column from Hawara inscribed with the names of Amenemhat III and Sobekneferu, in the Egyptian Museum, Cairo

==== Uncertain ====
A possible reference to Sobekneferu before her accession was found on a statue base discovered in Gezer in 1971, but its current whereabouts is unknown. The statue fragment made of granite gneiss measured 0.117 m (4.6 in) wide by 0.102 m (4.0 in) deep and rose to a height of 0.056 m (2.2 in). It is partial, preserving only the pedestal and feet of the subject with identical, albeit very fragmentary, inscriptions on either side. These bear Sobekneferu's nomen and identify her as a sꜣ.t-nsw. Nevertheless, there are multiple candidate subjects available: Sobekneferu, daughter of Senusret I; (Note: This daughter is attested to on an inscribed syenite offering stand (MET 34.1.11) found in a rubbish pile at the pyramid of Senusret I at El-Lisht and thought to bear sꜣt-nsw sbk-nfrw. In the vicinity an ivory wand (Cairo CG 9438 or JE 31046) inscribed for sꜣt-nsw nfrw-ptḥ (Neferuptah) was also found. Ryholt notes that the pyramid complex was regularly visited well into the Thirteenth Dynasty and argues therefore that there is 'nothing to indicate' that this attestation refers to a contemporary of Senusret I. Dodson and Hilton consider that the woman referred to is probably the daughter of Senusret I, but acknowledge the possibility of it being Sobekneferu. The fragment is very partial preserving only sꜣt-n... sbk-... which might even be ...-n sꜣt-sbk (Sat-Sobek) thus further complicating identification.) Sobekneferu, presumed daughter of Amenemhat III; or even a third as yet unknown Sobekneferu.

A damaged statuette (MET 65.59.1) of a woman in the Metropolitan Museum of Art (The Met) in New York has been suggested to represent Sobekneferu. The schist statuette measures 0.163 m (6.4 in) vertically, 0.11 m (4.3 in) frontally, and 0.75 m (30 in) sagitally. The woman's face is badly damaged, retaining only the features of her brow, left eye, cheek, and traces of her nose. She wears a shoulder-length globular wig which frames her ears, and a crown composed of a uraeus – now headless – flanked by two vultures with outstretched wings which is of unknown iconography. She was probably seated, her arms were crossed across her chest with the left hand alone protruding from beneath her ḥb-sd cloak pulled taught revealing her chest and shoulders. This posture and garb are known from a handful of Third and Fourth Dynasty images of royal women. The omission of the symbols of royal authority – the wꜣs scepter and ḥḏt crown – suggests the subject may be a royal mother rather than a pharaoh. It proves equally difficult to place in context: The style of the ears and eyelids preclude a dating earlier than the reign of Senusret III; however, the presence of archaic features from the Old Kingdom is unattested in the late Middle Kingdom suggesting a later date when both Old and Middle Kingdom styles were in vogue, particularly between the Twenty-Second and Twenty-Sixth Dynasties. It has a companion in a granite statuette head (ÆIN 595) found in the Ny Carlsberg Glyptotek in Copenhagen that, though substantially worn, bears the same style globular wig and uraeus – whether it also shares the vulture iconography is indeterminable – placing the two statuettes as contemporaneous which is easier to explain with a late Middle Kingdom date.

A statue-head (MET 08.200.2) of a Twelfth Dynasty king (Note: The head bears the royal nemes and uraeus, establishing the subject as a ruler.) in The Met discovered in a burial shaft south of the causeway of the pyramid of Amenemhat I at El Lisht remains unassigned, though candidates include Amenemhat I, III, IV, Senusret III, and Sobekneferu. The 0.14 m (5.5 in) tall limestone head's style is akin to those from late in Amenemhat III's reign. It may belong to a shrine from the same pyramid of which a partial limestone lintel (MET 22.1.12a, b), measuring 0.25 m (9.8 in) high by 0.65 m (2 ft 2 in) wide, bearing Amenemhat IV's name and titles has been recovered. (Note: The lintel bears an inscription reading 'long live the good god, Mꜣꜥ-ḫrw-rꜥ (Maa-kheru-re), given life forever'. Maa-kheru-re, meaning 'the righteous one of Ra' or 'the true of voice of Ra' is Amenemhat IV's prenomen.) The image bears a striking resemblance to Amenemhat IV, but has softer, more feminine features and is free of the wrinkles and depressions that characterise the bridge of Amenemhat IV's nose, leading Simon Connor to propose that it might be Sobekneferu.

A king's face from a statue (MET 29.100.150) of unknown provenance may speculatively represent Sobekneferu. It was bequeathed to The Met by Louisine W. Havemeyer in 1929 at which time it was identified as bearing the likeness of Amenemhat III, an attribution which remains the norm. The statue is 1:3 scale with a height of 0.089 m (3.5 in) carved into a grey marble. Its face is remarkably intact though only small fragments of the royal nms headdress are present and nothing below the neckline. It is wrinkle-free, with a defined bone structure and slight traces of loose skin; the nose has a slight characteristic arch with a bulbous tip; the lower lip bears a distinct depression; and the eyes are formed into the hooded almond shape recognisable in late Twelfth Dynasty portraiture. William Hayes assigned it to the 'expressive style' of Amenemhat III's sculptural tradition for its idealistic presentation of the young subject and contrasted it against a much later statue-head in black granite that portrayed him with 'utter and unrelenting realism'. Dorothea Arnold writes that the face displays 'an unmistakable femine character' making it 'tempting to identify the pharaoh represented as Queen Sobekneferu'.

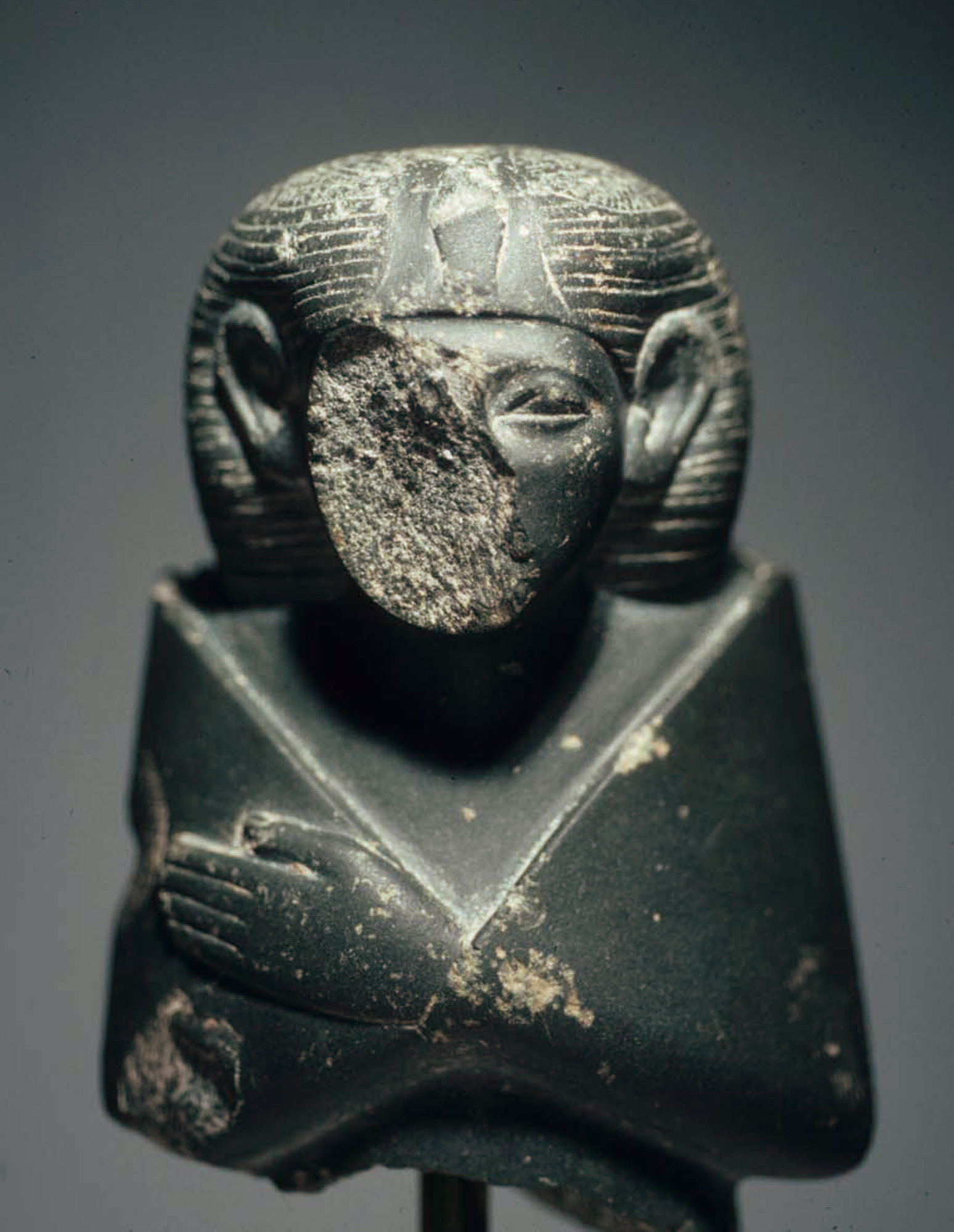
Damaged statuette of a late Middle Kingdom queen (MET 65.59.1) in The Met, possibly Sobekneferu

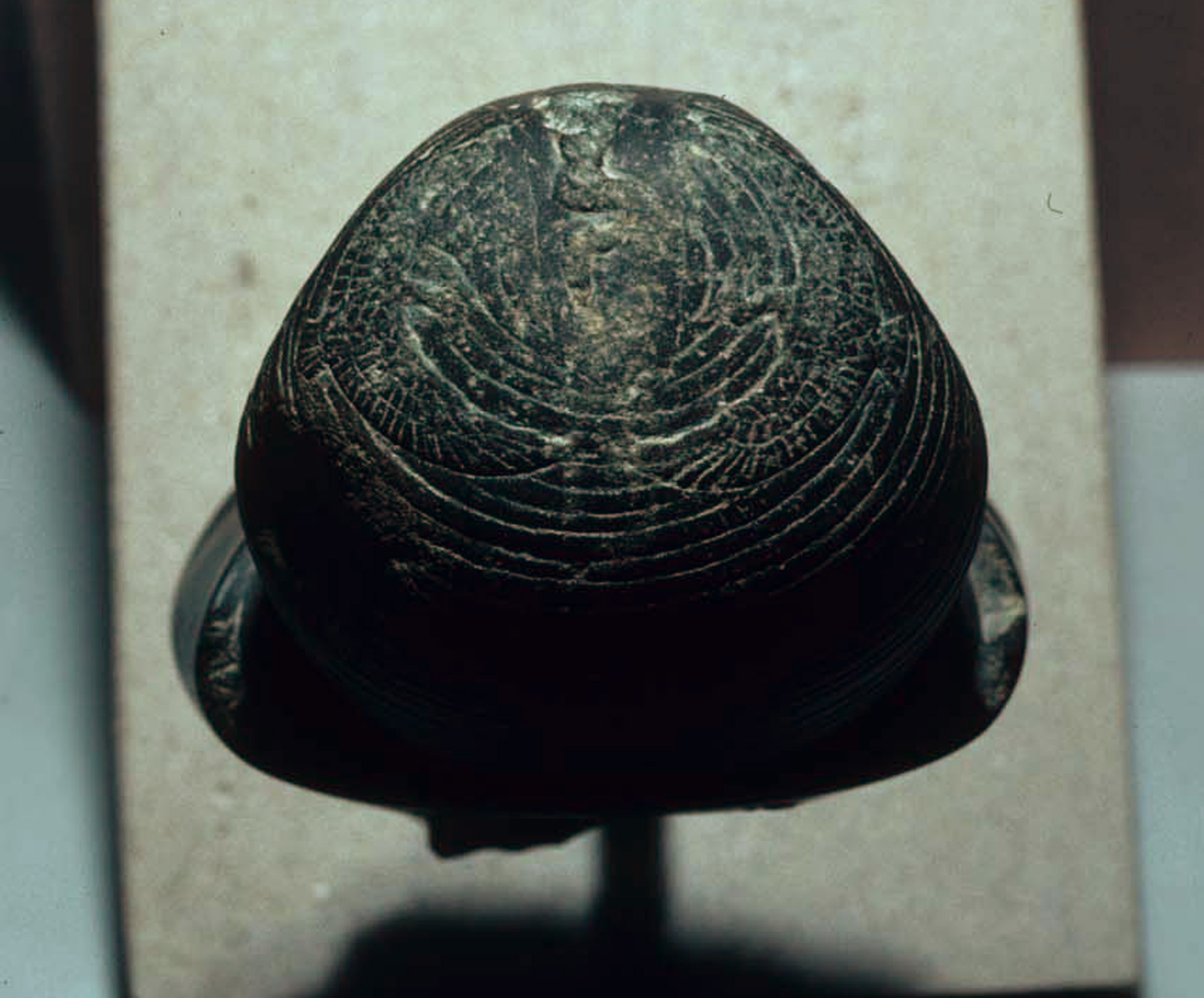
The unique twin vultures with wings outstretched either side of a uraeus wound through the centre of the subject's head

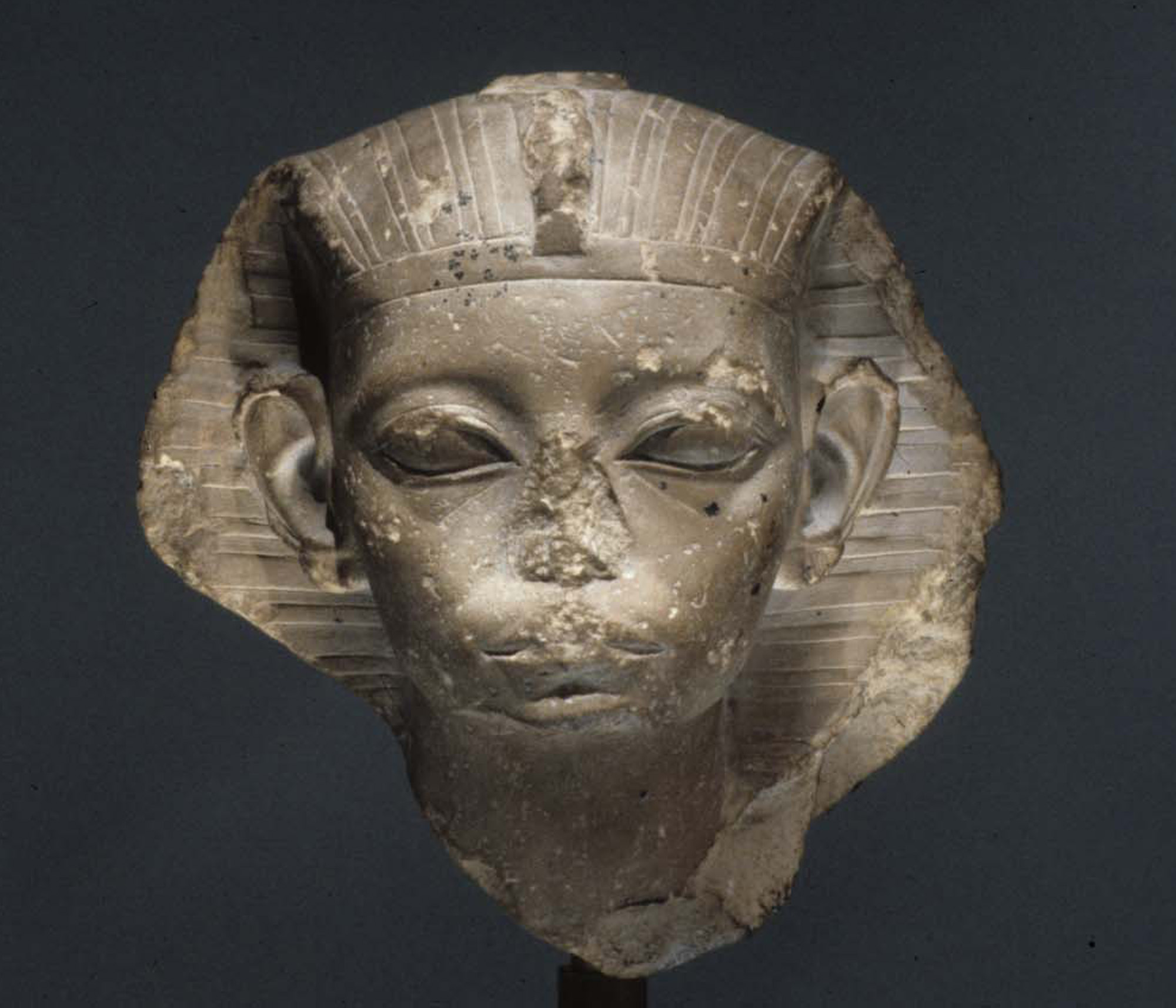
The head of an undetermined Twelfth Dynasty king (MET 08.200.2) in The Met, perhaps Amenemhat IV or Sobekneferu

=== Historical ===
In the Thutmosid period, she is listed on the Karnak list of early Egyptian kings in the twenty-second entry. In the Ramesside period, she is conspicuously excluded from the Abydos King List, but mentioned in the Saqqara Tablet, and Turin Canon. The Saqqara Tablet records her praenomen in the twenty-second entry. The Turin Canon – seventh column, second line (Note: Note that the reconstruction by Alan Gardiner published in the Royal Canon of Turin (1959) differs from the present reconstruction outlined in Kim Ryholt's The Turin King-list (2004) published in the journal Ägypten und Levante in the position of certain fragments of Gardiner's Col. IX and Col. X, some of which have been moved to the newly created Column 2. As a result, Gardiner Col. VI equates to Column 7 in the later restoration.) – credits her with a reign of 3 years, 10 months, and 24 days. Her exclusion at Abydos – along with all other female kings, pharaohs of the First and Second Intermediate Periods, and of the Amarna Period – indicates who Seti I and Ramesses II viewed as legitimate rulers of Egypt. In the Hellenistic period, Manetho gives her the name Σκεμιoφρις ('Skemiophris') and credits her with a reign of four years.

In the opening half of the Eighteenth Dynasty, a visiting scribe(s) left a pair of inscriptions referencing Sobekneferu in TT60 belonging to Senet, mother or wife of Intefiqer, vizier under Senusret I. The tomb contains the largest corpus of graffito amongst those in the Theban necropolis, indicating a pronounced interest in site driven by some combination of its prominent siting atop the hill at Sheikh Abd el-Qurna, impeccable state of preservation, contemporaneously perceived ancientness – few monuments in the area originate from the period –, and/or assumed affiliation with the royal house of the Twelfth Dynasty – perhaps inferred from the unique depiction of a seated king (Senusret I) by its entrance which do not otherwise appear in private tombs before the New Kingdom. The two inscriptions appear to erroneously identify the tomb as either belonging to or belonging to the time of Sobekneferu – a portion of the first inscription is now illegible casting doubt on its precise reading.

== Burial ==
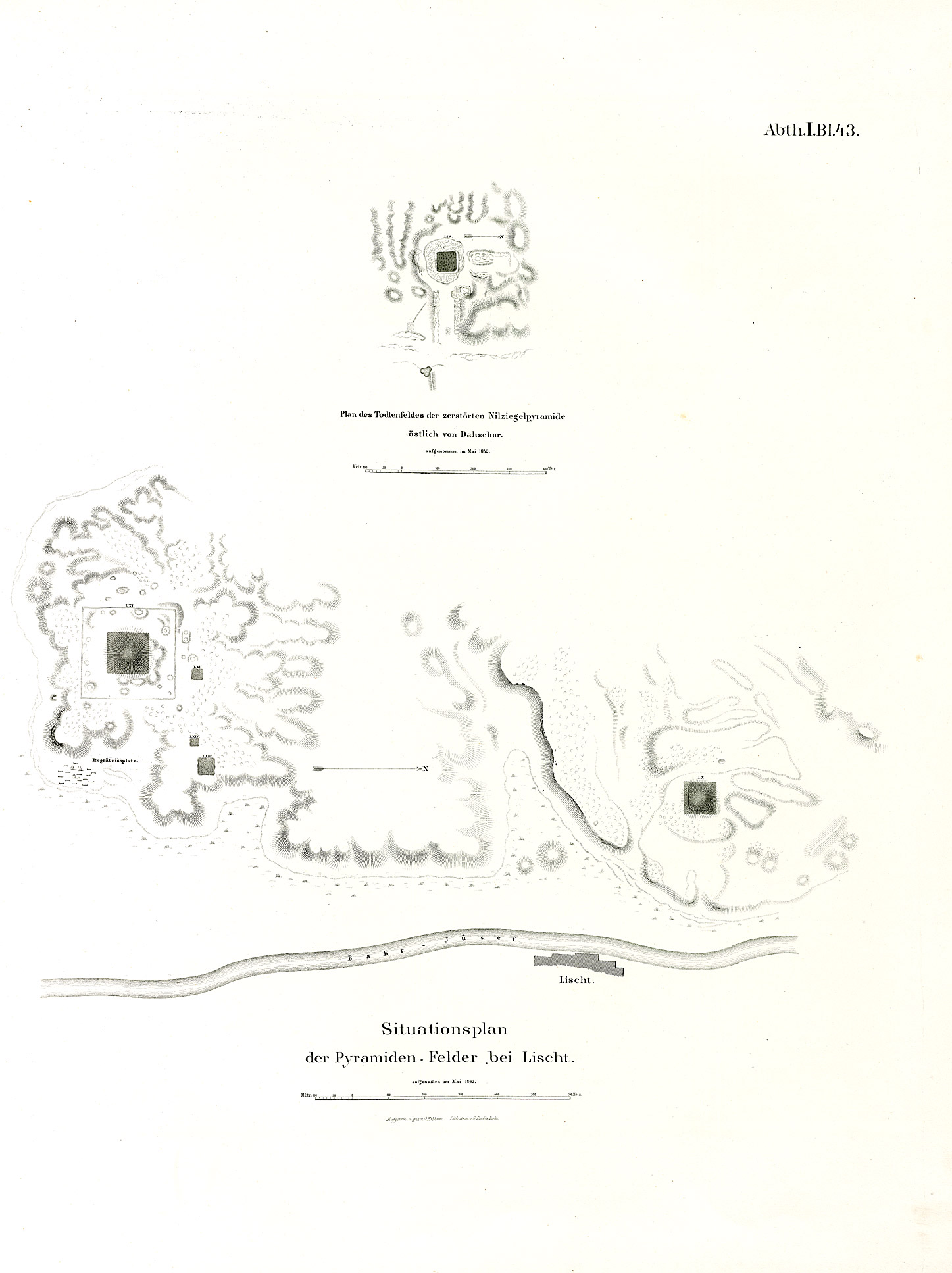
Map of the El Lisht pyramid field by Karl Richard Lepsius. Northern Mazghuna pyramid (middle, top).

Sobekneferu's tomb has not yet been positively identified. There is a Sekhem Sobekneferu mentioned on a papyrus (LDUCE-UC 32778) found at Harageh which may identify her monument. On a Thirteenth Dynasty funerary stela (Marseille 223) from Abydos, now in Marseille, there is mention of a ỉr.y-ꜥ.t (Note: storeroom administrator) of Sobekneferu named Heby attesting to an ongoing funerary cult.

=== Mazghuna ===
Two pyramids at Mazghuna were cleared and excavated by Ernest Mackay in 1910–1911 who attributed them to the final two suzerains of the Twelfth Dynasty: Amenemhat IV and Sobekneferu. (Note: The Northern Mazghuna pyramid, known previously, was apparently entered by Jacques de Morgan in the late 19th century, but the results of his work were evidently never published. The Southern Mazghuna pyramid was discovered and cleared during that excavation season.) No name was recovered from either site, so Mackay based his assignment on its similarity to the Hawara pyramid, proposing that '[t]he northern pyramid, being the largest, was probably intended for the former ruler, but it is practically certain that he must have been buried elsewhere, for the tomb had never been used'. (Note: The two pyramids are discussed in chapters xiii (southern) and xiv (northern). On attributing the southern pyramid: 'For whom was the southern pyramid of Mazghuneh built? The reply must be either Amenemhat IV, or his sister and successor Queen Sebek-neferu ... [t]he former king followed his father Amenemhat III ... [whose] tomb agrees in many important respects with the tomb I have just described, but is ... the earlier'. On the northern: 'We cannot say for whom this tomb was intended, for no trace of a name was found in the building, but, as we have noted, the presumption is that it was for Amenemhat IV or his immediate successor. It is also difficult to decide whether the tomb was ever in use ... yet the fact that the wall ... was broken would suggest that plunderers found [the chamber] blocked up when they entered it ...'.) Since then, scholars have frequently designated them to Amenemhat IV and Sobekneferu, with the North Mazghuna pyramid typically assigned to Sobekneferu.

Only the substructure of the pyramid was completed; construction of the superstructure and wider temple complex was never begun. The substructure passages had a complex plan: A stairway descended south from the east side of the pyramid leading to a square chamber connecting to a sloping westward passage up to a portcullis – consisting of a 42,000 kg (93,000 lb) quartzite block intended to slide into and block the passage – beyond which it wound through several more turns and a second, smaller portcullis before terminating at the antechamber. South of it lay the burial chamber which was near wholly occupied by a quartzite monolith vessel for the sarcophagus. In a deep recess lay a quartzite lid which was to be slid over the coffin and locked into place with a stone block. All of the exposed surfaces were painted red with additional lines of black paint. Though the burial place had been constructed, no burial was interred there. Outside lay a mudbrick causeway leading to the pyramid built to serve the workforce.

Mackay's designation preceded the discoveries of the pyramids of Khendjer (Note: Discovered and excavated by Gustave Jéquier between 1929–1931.) and Ameny Qemau (Note: Discovered by Charles Arthur Musès in 1957; investigated by Vito Maragioglio and Celeste Rinaldi in 1968.) of the Thirteenth Dynasty which have been noted to resemble those in Mazghuna causing some scholars to attribute them to the Thirteenth Dynasty instead.

=== Other proposals ===
Nabil Swelim and Aidan Dodson propose a chronological order of Hawara, Ameny-Qemau, North Mazghuna, South Mazghuna, and Khendjer. (Note: Dodson proposes that the Mazghuna pyramids belong to two rulers from Sekhemre Khutawy Sobekhotep, Hotepibre, Sewadjkare, Nedjemibre, Khaankhre Sobekhotep, and Amenemhat VII.) For either Amenemhat IV or Sobekneferu, Dodson suggests the South Dahshur A pyramid noting that it 'should probably be placed within the twenty-five years following the death of [Amenemhat] III'. Christoffer Theis revises Dodson's chronology, shifting the South Mazghuna pyramid much earlier in the chronology and provisionally assigns it to Sobekneferu on the basis of its architectural style and the evidence it was used for a burial, whilst for Amenemhat IV he suggests an as yet undiscovered tomb near Neferuptah's pyramid. (Note: Theis's proposed chronology is South Mazghuna, Central Dahshur, Hor Awibre, Khendjer, Ameny-Qemau, North Mazghuna, Merneferre Ay, and Southern South Saqqara.) Stefania Pignattari suggests that Sobekneferu's tomb may reside in Hawara owing to her connections with the site, and that Amenemhat IV's may be in Dahshur.

== See also ==
- Hatshepsut
- Merneith
- Neithhotep

== Notes ==
General

Titles, names, and epithets

== Bibliography ==
=== Books ===
- Almásy, Adrienn; Kiss, Enikő (2010). "Catalogue by Adrienn Almásy and Enikő Kiss". In Luft, Ulrich; Adrienn, Almásy (eds.). Bi'r Minayh, Report on the Survey 1998-2004. Studia Aegyptiaca. Budapest: Archaeolingua. pp. 173–193. ISBN 978-9639911116.
- Arnold, Dieter (1992). The South Cemeteries of Lisht Volume III: The Pyramid Complex of Senwosret I. Publications of The Metropolitan Museum of Art Egyptian Expedition. Vol. XXV. New York: The Metropolitan Museum of Art. ISBN 0-87099-612-6.
- Arnold, Dieter (1996). "Hypostyle Halls of the Old and Middle Kingdoms". In Der Manuelian, Peter (ed.). Studies in Honor of William Kelly Simpson. Vol. 1. Boston, MA: Museum of Fine Arts. pp. 38–54. ISBN 0-87846-390-9.
- Arnold, Dieter (2003). The Encyclopaedia of Ancient Egyptian Architecture. London: I.B. Tauris. ISBN 978-1-86064-465-8.
- Badawy, Alexander (1966). A History of Egyptian Architecture: The First Intermediate Period, the Middle Kingdom, and the Second Intermediate Period. Berkeley & Los Angeles: University of California Press.
- Berman, Lawrence; Letellier, Bernadette (1996). Pharaohs : Treasures of Egyptian Art from the Louvre. Oxford: Oxford University Press. ISBN 0-19-521235-5.
- Bietak, Manfred (1999). "Tell ed-Dab'a, Second Intermediate Period". In Bard, Kathryn (ed.). Encyclopedia of the archaeology of ancient Egypt. London; New York: Routledge. pp. 949–953. ISBN 978-0-203-98283-9.
- Callender, Gae (1998). "Materials for the Reign of Sobekneferu". In Eyre, Christopher J. (ed.). Proceedings of the Seventh International Congress of Egyptologists, Cambridge, 3-9 September 1995. Orientalia Lovaniensia analecta. Vol. 82. Leuven: Peeters. pp. 227–236. ISBN 9042900148. ISSN 0777-978X.
- Callender, Gae (2003). "The Middle Kingdom Renaissance (c. 2055–1650 BC)". In Shaw, Ian (ed.). The Oxford History of Ancient Egypt. Oxford: Oxford University Press. pp. 137–171. ISBN 978-0-19-815034-3.
- Clayton, Peter A. (1994). Chronicle of the Pharaohs. London: Thames & Hudson. ISBN 978-0-500-05074-3.
- Connor, Simon (2020). Être et paraître, Statues royales et privées de la fin du Moyen Empire et de la Deuxième Période intermédiaire (1850-1550 av. J.-C.). Middle Kingdom Studies (in French). Vol. 10. London: Golden House Publications. ISBN 978-1-906137-66-3. ISSN 2515-0944.
- Cooney, Kara (2018). When Women Ruled the World: Six Queens of Egypt. Washington, DC: National Geographic. ISBN 978-1-4262-1977-1.
- Davies, Norman de Garis; Gardiner, Alan H. (1920). The tomb of Antefoḳer, vizier of Sesostris I, and of his wife, Senet (no. 60). London: George Allen & Unwin.
- Delia, Robert D. (2001). "Senwosret III". In Redford, Donald B. (ed.). The Oxford Encyclopedia of Ancient Egypt. Vol. 3. Oxford: Oxford University Press. pp. 268–269. ISBN 0-19-510234-7.
- Dodson, Aidan (2012). "Second Intermediate Period". In Bagnall, R. S.; Broderson, K.; Champion, C.B.; Erskine, A.; Huebner, S. R. (eds.). The Encyclopedia of Ancient History. West Sussex, UK: Wiley. pp. 1–3. doi:10.1002/9781444338386.wbeah15135. ISBN 9781444338386.
- Dodson, Aidan (2013) [1994]. The Canopic Equipment Of The Kings of Egypt. London: Routledge. ISBN 9781136158148.
- Dodson, Aidan; Hilton, Dyan (2004). The Complete Royal Families of Ancient Egypt. London: Thames & Hudson. ISBN 0-500-05128-3.
- Doncker, Alexis Den (2012). "Theban Tomb Graffiti during the New Kingdom. Research on the Reception of Ancient Egyptians Images by Ancient Egyptians". In Kóthay, Katalin Anna (ed.). Art and Society: Ancient and Modern Contexts of Egyptian Art. Proceedings of the International Conference held at the Museum of Fine Arts, Budapest, 13–15 May 2010. Budapest: Museum of Fine Arts. pp. 23–34. ISBN 978-963-7063-91-6.
- Doxey, Denise M. (2001). "Sobek". In Redford, Donald B. (ed.). The Oxford Encyclopedia of Ancient Egypt. Vol. 3. Oxford: Oxford University Press. pp. 300–301. ISBN 0-19-510234-7.
- Dunham, Dows; Janssen, Jozef Marie Antoon (1960). Semna Kumma. Second Cataract Forts. Vol. 1. Boston: Museum of Fine Arts. OCLC 1419130756.
- Edwards, Iorwerth Eiddon Stephen (1947). The Pyramids of Egypt. Harmondsworth, Middlesex: Penguin Books.
- Fakhry, Ahmed (1969) [1961]. The Pyramids. Chicago: University of Chicago Press.
- Fay, Biri; Freed, Rita; Schelper, Thomas; Seyfried, Friederike (2015). "Neferusobek Project: Part I". In Miniaci, Gianluci; Grajetzki, Wolfram (eds.). The World of Middle Kingdom Egypt (2000-1550 BC). Vol. I. London: Golden House Publications. pp. 89–91. ISBN 978-1906137434.
- Firchow, Otto (1942). Studien zu den Pyramidenanlagen der 12. Dynastie. Hamburg: Buchdruckerei Broschek & Company.
- Franke, Detlef (1995). "The Middle Kingdom in Egypt". In Sasson, Jack M. (ed.). Civilizations of the Ancient Near East. Vol. 2. New York: Simon & Schuster MacMillan. pp. 735–748. ISBN 0-684-19721-9.
- Fechheimer, Hedwig (1914). Die Plastik Der Ägypter. Die Kunst Des Ostens (in German). Vol. I. Berlin: Bruno Cassirer Verlag. OCLC 838068961.
- Fischer, Henry George (1996). Varia Nova. Egyptian Studies. Vol. III. New York: The Metropolitan Museum of Art. ISBN 0-87099-755-6.
- Fischer-Elfert, Hans W. (2003). "Representations of the Past in New Kingdom Literature". In Tait, John (ed.). 'Never Had the Like Occurred': Egypt's view of its past. Encounters with Ancient Egypt. London: UCL Press Institute of Archaeology. pp. 119–138. ISBN 1-84472-007-1.
- Frelinghuysen, Alice Cooney; Tinterow, Gary; Stein, Susan Alyson; Wold, Gretchen; Meech, Julia (1993). Splendid Legacy: The Havemeyer Collection. New York: The Metropolitan Museum of Art. ISBN 0-87099-664-9.
- Gardiner, Alan H. (1961). Egypt of the Pharaohs: An Introduction. Oxford: Oxford University Press.
- Gautier, Joseph Étienne; Jéquier, Gustave (1902). Mémoire sur les Fouilles de Licht (in French). Le Caire: l'Institut Français d'Archéologie Orientale.
- Gauthier, Henri (1907–1917). Le Livre Des Rois d'Égypte: Recueil de Titres et Protocoles Royaux, Suivi d'Un Index Alphabetique. Mémoires publiés par les membres de l'Institut Français d'Archéologie Orientale du Caire (in French). Vol. 17–21. Le Caire: l'Institut Français d’Archéologie Orientale. OCLC 2712785.
- Gillam, Robyn (2001). "Sobekneferu". In Redford, Donald B. (ed.). The Oxford Encyclopedia of Ancient Egypt. Vol. 3. Oxford: Oxford University Press. p. 301. ISBN 0-19-510234-7.
- Gillam, Robyn (2018). "Sobekneferu". In Bagnall, R. S.; Broderson, K.; Champion, C.B.; Erskine, A.; Huebner, S. R. (eds.). The Encyclopedia of Ancient History. West Sussex, UK: Wiley. pp. 1–2. doi:10.1002/9781444338386.wbeah15135. ISBN 9781444338386.
- Grajetzki, Wolfram (2001). Two Treasurers of the Middle Kingdom. Oxford: BAR Publishing. ISBN 9781841712864.
- Grajetzki, Wolfram (2006). The Middle Kingdom of Ancient Egypt: History, Archaeology and Society. London: Duckworth. ISBN 0-7156-3435-6.
- Grimal, Nicolas (1992). A History of Ancient Egypt. Translated by Ian Shaw. Oxford: Blackwell Publishing. ISBN 978-0-631-19396-8.
- Habachi, Labib (1954). "Khatâ'na-Qantîr : Importance". Annales du Service des Antiquités de l'Égypte. Vol. 52. Le Caire: l'Institut Français d'Archéologie Orientale. pp. 443–559. OCLC 851266710.
- Haney, Lisa Saladino (2020). Visualising Coregency: An Exploration of the Link between Royal Image and Co-Rule during the Reign of Senwosret III and Amenemhet III. Harvard Egyptological Studies. Vol. 8. Boston: Brill. ISBN 9789004422155. ISSN 2352-7501.
- Hawass, Zahi (2010). Inside the Egyptian Museum with Zahi Hawass. Cairo: American University in Cairo Press. ISBN 978-977-416-364-7.
- Hayes, William (1978) [1946]. The Scepter of Egypt: A Background for the Study of the Egyptian Antiquities in the Metropolitan Museum of Art, Part 1. From the Earliest Times to the End of the Middle Kingdom. New York: Metropolitan Museum of Art. ISBN 0-87099-190-6.
- Hayes, William (2006) [1973]. "II. The Decline and Fall of the Middle Kingdom: The Thirteenth and Fourteenth Dynasties". In Edwards, Iorwerth Eiddon Stephen; Gadd, C. J.; Hammond, N. G. L.; Sollberger, E. (eds.). Cambridge Ancient History. Vol. 2.1. Cambridge: Cambridge University Press. pp. 42–74. ISBN 0-521-082307.
- Heffernan, Gabrielle Mary (2017). Remembering Royalty in ancient Egypt: Shared Memories of 'Royal Ancestors' by Private Individuals in the Eighteenth Dynasty (Doctor of Philosophy thesis). Birmingham: University of Birmingham.
- Hintze, Fritz; Reineke, Walter F. (1989). Felsinschriften aus dem sudanesischen Nubien. Publikation der Nubien-Expedition 1961—1963 (in German). Vol. 1 & 2. Berlin: Akademie-Verlag Berlin. ISBN 3-05-000370-7.
- Hölzl, Christian (2005) [1999]. "Mazghuna". In Bard, Kathryn A. (ed.). Encyclopedia of the Archaeology of Ancient Egypt. London: Routledge. pp. 570–571. ISBN 0-203-98283-5.
- Jéquier, Gustave (1933). Fouilles à Saqqarah: Deux Pyramides du Moyen Empire (in French). Le Caire: l'Institut Français d'Archéologie Orientale.
- Kaiser, Werner (1967). Ägyptisches Museum Berlin : östlicher Stülerbau am Schloss Charlottenburg (in German). Berlin: Staatliche Museen Preussischer Kulturbesitz. OCLC 17144805.
- Keller, Cathleen (2005). "Hatshepsut's Reputation in History". In Roehrig, Catharine (ed.). Hatshepsut From Queen to Pharaoh. New York: Metropolitan Museum of Art. pp. 294–298. ISBN 1-58839-173-6.
- Kitchen, Kenneth A. (1975–1990). Ramesside Inscriptions: Historical and Biographical. Oxford: Blackwell. ISBN 0-903563-08-8. OCLC 1340684401.
- Krauss, Rolf; Warburton, David (2006). "Conclusions and Chronological Tables". In Hornung, Erik; Krauss, Rolf; Warburton, David (eds.). Ancient Egyptian Chronology. Leiden: Brill. pp. 473–498. ISBN 978-90-04-11385-5.
- Landua-McCormack, Dawn (2008). Dynasty XIII Kingship in Ancient Egypt: A Study of Political Power and Administration through an Investigation of the Royal Tombs of the Late Middle Kingdom (Doctor of Philosophy thesis). Ann Arbor, MI: UMI Dissertation Services.
- Lehner, Mark (2008) [1997]. The Complete Pyramids. New York: Thames & Hudson. ISBN 978-0-500-28547-3.
- Leprohon, Ronald J. (2001). "Amenemhat III". In Redford, Donald B. (ed.). The Oxford Encyclopedia of Ancient Egypt. Vol. 1. Oxford: Oxford University Press. pp. 69–70. ISBN 0-19-510234-7.
- Lepsius, Karl Richard (n.d.) [1849]. Denkmaeler aus Aegypten und Aethiopien : Nach den Zeichnungen der von Seiner Majestät dem Koenige von Preussen Friedrich Wilhelm IV Nach Diesen Ländern Gesendeten und in den Jahren 1842–1845 Ausgeführten Wissenschaftlichen Expedition (in German). Berlin: Nicolaische Buchhandlung. OCLC 1284732397.
- Murnane, William (1977). Ancient Egyptian Coregencies. Studies in Ancient Oriental Civilization. Vol. 40. Chicago, IL: The Oriental Institute. OCLC 462126791.
- Murnane, William (2001). "Coregency". In Redford, Donald B. (ed.). The Oxford Encyclopedia of Ancient Egypt. Vol. 1. Oxford: Oxford University Press. pp. 307–311. ISBN 0-19-510234-7.
- Naville, Édouard (1887). Goshen and The Shrine of Saft El-Henneh (1885). Memoir of the Egypt Exploration Fund. Vol. 5. London: Trübner & Co. OCLC 3737680.
- Oppenheim, Adela; Arnold, Dorothea; Arnold, Dieter; Yamamoto, Kumiko, eds. (2015). Ancient Egypt Transformed: the Middle Kingdom. New York: Metropolitan Museum of Art. ISBN 9781588395641.
- Petrie, William Matthew Flinders (1889a). Hawara, Biahmu, and Arsinoe. London: Field & Tuer : "The Leadenhall Press" : E.C. Trübner & Co. OCLC 37010618.
- Petrie, William Matthew Flinders (1889b). Historical scarabs: A Series of Drawings from the Principal Collections: Arranged Chronologically. London: D. Nutt, 270. OCLC 3969698.
- Petrie, William Matthew Flinders (1890). Kahun, Gurob, and Hawara. London: Kegan Paul, Trench, Trübner, and Co. OCLC 247721143.
- Petrie, William Matthew Flinders (1894). A History of Egypt: From the Earliest Times to the XVIth Dynasty. London: Methuen & Co. OCLC 697791485.
- Petrie, William Matthew Flinders; Wainwright, Gerald Avery; Mackay, Ernest (1912). The Labyrinth, Gerzeh and Mazghuneh. Oxford: Bernard Quaritch.
- Pignattari, Stefania (2018). Amenemhat IV and the End of the Twelfth Dynasty: Between the End and the Beginning. BAR International Series 2906. Oxford: BAR Publishing. doi:10.30861/9781407316352. ISBN 9781407316352.
- Porter, Barbara A. (2001). "Neithhotep". In Redford, Donald B. (ed.). The Oxford Encyclopedia of Ancient Egypt. Vol. 2. Oxford: Oxford University Press. pp. 517–518. ISBN 0-19-510234-7.
- Porter, Bertha; Moss, Rosalind (1968) [1934]. The Topographical Bibliography of Ancient Egyptian Hieroglyphic Texts, Reliefs, and Paintings. Vol. IV (2nd ed.). Oxford: Griffith Institute, Ashmolean Museum. OCLC 503005977.
- Quirke, Stephen (1991). "Royal Power in the 13th Dynasty". In Quirke, Stephen (ed.). Middle Kingdom Studies. Vol. I. London: Whitstable. pp. 123–140. ISBN 1-872561-02-0.
- Quirke, Stephen (2001a). "Second Intermediate Period". In Redford, Donald B. (ed.). The Oxford Encyclopedia of Ancient Egypt. Vol. 3. Oxford: Oxford University Press. pp. 260–265. ISBN 0-19-510234-7.
- Quirke, Stephen (2001b). "Thirteenth Dynasty". In Redford, Donald B. (ed.). The Oxford Encyclopedia of Ancient Egypt. Vol. 3. Oxford: Oxford University Press. pp. 394–398. ISBN 0-19-510234-7.
- Quirke, Stephen (2006). "In the Name of the King: On Late Middle Kingdom Cylinders". In Czerny, Ernst; Hein, Irmgard; Hunger, Hermann; Melman, Dagmar; Schwab, Angela (eds.). Timelines: Studies in Honour of Manfred Bietak. Vol. I. Leuven: Peeters. pp. 263–274. ISBN 90-429-1730-X.
- Redford, Donald B., ed. (2001). "Egyptian King List". The Oxford Encyclopedia of Ancient Egypt. Vol. 3. Oxford: Oxford University Press. pp. 621–622. ISBN 0-19-510234-7.
- Robins, Gay (2001). "Queens". In Redford, Donald B. (ed.). The Oxford Encyclopedia of Ancient Egypt. Vol. 3. Oxford: Oxford University Press. pp. 105–109. ISBN 0-19-510234-7.
- Roth, Ann Macy (2005). "Models of Authority : Hatshepsut's Predecessors in Power". In Roehrig, Catharine (ed.). Hatshepsut From Queen to Pharaoh. New York: Metropolitan Museum of Art. ISBN 1-58839-173-6.
- Ryholt, Kim (1997). The Political Situation in Egypt during the Second Intermediate Period, c. 1800-1550 B.C. Copenhagen: Museum Tusculanum Press. ISBN 87-7289-421-0.
- Schneider, Thomas (2006). "The Relative Chronology of the Middle Kingdom and the Hyksos Period (Dyns. 12-17)". In Hornung, Erik; Krauss, Rolf; Warburton, David (eds.). Ancient Egyptian Chronology. Leiden: Brill. pp. 168–196. ISBN 978-90-04-11385-5.
- Shaw, Ian; Nicholson, Paul (1995). British Museum Dictionary of Ancient Egypt. London: British Museum. ISBN 0-7141-0982-7.
- Shaw, Ian, ed. (2003). The Oxford History of Ancient Egypt. Oxford: Oxford University Press. ISBN 978-0-19-815034-3.
- Siesse, Julie (2019). La XIIIe Dynastie (in French). Paris: Sorbonne Université Presses. ISBN 979-10-231-0567-4.
- Simpson, William Kelly (1980). "Masghuna". In Helck, Wolfgang; Westendorf, Wolfhart (eds.). Lexikon der Ägyptologie. Vol. III. Wiesbaden: Otto Harrassowitz. p. 1196. ISBN 3-447-02100-4.
- Simpson, William Kelly (2001). "Twelfth Dynasty". In Redford, Donald B. (ed.). The Oxford Encyclopedia of Ancient Egypt. Vol. 3. Oxford: Oxford University Press. pp. 453–457. ISBN 0-19-510234-7.
- Tyldesley, Joyce (2009). The Pharaohs. London: Quercus. ISBN 978-1-84724-495-6.
- Uphill, Eric (2010). Pharaoh's Gateway to Eternity : The Hawara Labyrinth of Amenemhat III. London: Routledge. ISBN 978-0-7103-0627-2.
- van der Mieroop, Marc (2011). A history of ancient Egypt. West Sussex: Wiley-Blackwell. ISBN 978-1-4051-6070-4.
- Verner, Miroslav (2001) [1999]. The Pyramids: The Mystery, Culture and Science of Egypt's Great Monuments. New York: Grove Press. ISBN 978-0-8021-1703-8.
- Vernus, Pascal (1986). Le surnom au Moyen Empire : Répertoire. procédés d'expression et structures de la double identité du début de la XIIe dynastie à la finde la XVIIe dynastie. Rome: Biblical Institute Press. ISBN 88-7653-583-7.
- von Beckerath, Jürgen (1984b). "Sobeknofru". In Helck, Wolfgang; Westendorf, Wolfhart (eds.). Lexikon der Ägyptologie (in German). Vol. V. Wiesbaden: Otto Harrassowitz. ISBN 3-447-02489-5.
- Waddell, William Gillan; Manetho (1964) [1940]. Page, Thomas Ethelbert; Capps, Edward; Rouse, William Henry Denham; Post, Levi Arnold; Warmington, Eric Herbert (eds.). Manetho with an English Translation. Cambridge, MA: Harvard University Press. OCLC 610359927.
- Wildung, Dietrich (1984). Sesostris und Amenemhat: Ägypten im Mittleren Reich (in German). München: Hirmer. ISBN 9783777437200.
- Wilfong, Terry G. (2001). "Faiyum". In Redford, Donald B. (ed.). The Oxford Encyclopedia of Ancient Egypt. Vol. 1. Oxford: Oxford University Press. pp. 496–498. ISBN 0-19-510234-7.
- Wilkinson, Toby (2011). The Rise and Fall of Ancient Egypt. London: Bloomsbury. ISBN 978-1-4088-1002-6.
- Willems, Harco (2010). "The First Intermediate Period and the Middle Kingdom". In Lloyd, Alan B. (ed.). A Companion to Ancient Egypt. Vol. I. West Sussex, UK: Wiley-Blackwell. pp. 81–100. doi:10.1002/9781444320053. ISBN 978-1-4051-5598-4.
- Yvanez, Elsa (2010). Rock Inscriptions from Semna and Kumma: Epigraphic Study. Khartoum: Sudan National Museum & Section Français de la Direction des Antiquités du Soudan.
- Zecchi, Marco (2010). Sobek of Shedet : The Crocodile God in the Fayyum in the Dynastic Period. Studi sull'antico Egitto. Todi: Tau Editrice. ISBN 978-88-6244-115-5.

=== Journal articles ===
- Aldred, Cyril (1970). "Some Royal Portraits of the Middle Kingdom in Ancient Egypt". Metropolitan Museum Journal. 3: 27–50. doi:10.2307/1512597. ISSN 2169-3072. JSTOR 1512957.
- Aufrère, Sydney (1990). "Remarques sur la transmission des noms royaux par les traditions orale et écrite". Bulletin de l'Institut Français d'Archéologie Orientale (in French). 89. Le Caire: l'Institut Français d’Archéologie Orientale: 1–14. ISSN 2429-2869.
- Bács, Tamás A. (2006). "The Tip of a Horn: The Possible Origin of an Iconographic Theme in the Elite Tombs of New Kingdom Thebes" (PDF). Acta Antiqua: Academiae Scientarum Hungaricae. XLVI (1–2). Budapest: Akadémiai Kiadó: 3–16. doi:10.1556/AAnt.46.2006.1-2.2. ISSN 0044-5975.
- Bell, Barbara (1975). "Climate and the History of Egypt: The Middle Kingdom". American Journal of Archaeology. 79 (3): 223–269. doi:10.2307/503481. ISSN 0002-9114. JSTOR 503481.
- Canhão, Telo (2019). "The latter solution Neferusobek". Hapi (in Portuguese and English). 7. Lisboa: Revista da Associação Cultural de Amizade Portugal-Egipto: 26–53. ISSN 2183-0991.
- Daressy, Georges (1917). "Deux Grandes Statues de Ramsès II d'Héracléopolis". Annales du Service de Antiquités de l'Égypte (in French). 17. Le Caire: l'Institut Français d'Archéologie Orientale: 33–38.
- De Putter, Thierry (1993). "Les inscriptions de Semna et Koumma (Nubie): Niveaux de crues exceptionnelles ou d'un lac de retenue artificiel du Moyen Empire?". Studien zur Altägyptischen Kultur (in French). 20: 255–288. ISSN 0340-2215. JSTOR 25150203.
- Diamond, Kelly Anne (2020). "The Reign of King Sobekneferu and her Performance of Gender" (PDF). Birmingham Egyptology Journal. 7: 1–18. ISSN 2053-3586.
- Diamond, Kelly Anne (2022). "The Sartorial Choices of Sobekneferu: Louvre Statue E 27135". The Journal of Egyptian Archaeology. 108 (1–2): 213–229. doi:10.1177/03075133221138861. ISSN 0307-5133.
- Dodson, Aidan (1987). "The Tombs of the Kings of the Thirteenth Dynasty in the Memphite Necropolis". Zeitschrift für Ägyptische Sprache und Altertumskunde. 114 (1–2): 36–45. doi:10.1524/zaes.1987.114.12.36. ISSN 0044-216X.
- Donadoni, Sergio (1947). "Testi geroglifici di Madinet Madi". Orientalia. Nova (in Italian). 16 (3): 333–352. JSTOR 43078035.
- Fay, Biri (1988). "Amenemhat V – Vienna/Assuan". Mitteilungen des Deutschen Archäologischen Instituts Abteilung Kairo. 44. Mainz/Rhein: Philipp von Zabern: 67–78, Tafeln 18–29. ISBN 3-8053-1039-0. ISSN 0342-1279.
- Grajetzki, Wolfram (2013). Wendrich, Willeke (ed.). "Late Middle Kingdom". UCLA Encyclopedia of Egyptology: 1–14. ISSN 2693-7425.
- Grajetzki, Wolfram (2017). "The two burials of Neferuptah and other second burials for royal women". Cahiers Caribéens d’Egyptologie. 22: 33–42. ISSN 1626-2913.
- Lansing, Ambrose (1930). "The Exhibition of the H.O. Havemeyer Collection". Bulletin of the Metropolitan Museum of Art. 25 (3): 53–76. doi:10.2307/3255898. JSTOR 3255898.
- Lepsius, Karl Richard (1853). "über die 12. Ägyptische Königsdynastie". Abhandlungen der Königlichen Akademie der Wissenschaften zu Berlin aus dem Jahre 1852. Berlin: Königlichen Akademie der Wissenschaften: 425–454.
- Mace, Arthur Cruttenden (1908). "The Egyptian Expedition: III. The Pyramid of Amenemhat". The Metropolitan Museum of Art Bulletin. 3 (10): 184–188. doi:10.2307/3252551. ISSN 0026-1521. JSTOR 3252551.
- Málek, Jaromír (1982). "The Original Version of the Royal Canon of Turin". The Journal of Egyptian Archaeology. 68: 93–106. doi:10.2307/3821628. JSTOR 3821628.
- Newberry, Percy (1943). "Co-Regencies of Ammenemes III, IV, and Sebknofru". The Journal of Egyptian Archaeology. 29: 74–75. doi:10.2307/3855043. ISSN 0307-5133. JSTOR 3855043.
- Perez Die, Carmen (2016). "The Herakleopolis Magna Project (Ehnasya el Medina). Summary and Results of Work 2000-2015". Trabajos de Egiptología: Papers on Ancient Egypt. 7 (7): 131–160. doi:10.25145/j.TdE.2016.07.08. ISSN 1695-4750.
- Ragazzoli, Chloé C.D. (2013). "The social creation of a scribal place: The visitors' inscriptions in the tomb attributed to Antefiqer (TT 60) (With newly recorded graffiti)". Studien zur Altägyptischen Kultur. 42. Hamburg: Helmut Buske Verlag GmbH: 269–323. ISSN 0340-2215. JSTOR 44160213.
- Reisner, George (1925). "Excavations in Egypt and Ethiopia 1922-1925". Museum of Fine Arts Bulletin. XXIII (137): 17–29. JSTOR 4169946.
- Ryholt, Kim (2000). "The Late Old Kingdom in the Turin King-list and the Identity of Nitocris". Zeitschrift für Ägyptische Sprache und Altertumskunde. 127 (1): 87–119. doi:10.1524/zaes.2000.127.1.87. ISSN 0044-216X. S2CID 159962784.
- Ryholt, Kim (2004). "The Turin King-list". Ägypten und Levante. 14: 135–155. ISSN 1813-5145. JSTOR 23788139.
- Schiestl, Robert (2012). "Pottery from Pyramids of the 13th Dynasty in the Dahshur Region: Survey in Dahshur 2006". Bulletin de liaison de la céramique égyptienne. 23. Le Caire: l'Institut Français d’Archéologie Orientale: 51–62. ISBN 978-2-7247-0635-2. ISSN 0255-0903.
- Siesse, Julien (2016–2017). "L'identité du fondateur de la 13e dynastie : Amenemhat-Sobekhotep ou Ougaf?". Cahiers de Recherches de l'Institut de Papyrologie et d'Égyptologie de Lille (in French). 31. Lille: Université de Lille: 161–178. ISSN 0153-5021.
- Swelim, Nabil; Dodson, Aidan (1998). "On the Pyramid of Ameny-Qemau and its Canopic Equipment". Mitteilungen des Deutschen Archäologischen Instituts Abteilung Kairo. 54. Mainz/Rhein: Philipp von Zabern: 319–334, tafel 54–55. ISBN 9783805324175. ISSN 0342-1279.
- Theis, Christoffer (2009b). "Die Pyramiden der. 13. Dynastie". Studien zur Altägyptischen Kultur (in German). 38. Hamburg: Helmut Buske Verlag GmbH: 311–342. ISSN 0340-2215. JSTOR 27751379.
- von Beckerath, Jürgen (1995). "Nochmals zur Chronologie der XII. Dynastie". Orientalia. Nova Series (in German). 64 (4). Leuven: Peeters Publishing: 445–449. ISSN 0030-5367. JSTOR 43078102.
- Weinstein, James (1974). "A Statuette of the Princess Sobeknefru at Tell Gezer". Bulletin of the American Schools of Oriental Research. 213 (213): 49–57. doi:10.2307/1356083. ISSN 2161-8062. JSTOR 1356083. S2CID 164156906.
- Yoyotte, Jean (1957). "Le Soukhos de la Maréotide et d'autres cultes régionaux du Dieu-Crocodile d'après les cylindres du Moyen Empire". Bulletin de l'Institut Français d'Archéologie Orientale (in French). 56. Le Caire: l'Institut Français d’Archéologie Orientale: 81–95. doi:10.3406/bifao.1957.2152. ISSN 2429-2869.

=== Magazines ===
- Budka, Julia (2000). "Amen-em-hat IV, Neferu-Sobek und das Ende des Mittleren Reiches" [Amen-em-hat IV, Neferu-Sobek and the End of the Middle Kingdom]. Kemet (in German). Vol. 9, no. 3. Weaverville, NC: Kmt Communications. pp. 16–19.
- Theis, Christoffer (2009a). "Die chronologische Abfolge der Pyramiden der 13. Dynastie" [The chronological order of the Pyramids of the 13th Dynasty]. Sokar (in German). Berlin: Michael Haase. pp. 52–61.
- Wegner, Josef; Cahail, Kevin M. (2014). "Ancient Reuse: The Discovery of a Royal Sarchopagus Chamber". Expedition. Vol. 56, no. 1. Philadelphia, PA: Penn Museum. pp. 19–23.

=== Museum catalogues ===
Louvre

- "Chambre des Ancêtres". Louvre (in French). n.d.
- "E 27135". Louvre (in French). n.d.

Staatliche Museen zu Berlin

- General Administration (1969) [1913]. Aegyptische Inschriften aus den Staatlichen Museen zu Berlin (in German). Vol. I. Leipzig: J. C. Hinrichssche Buchhandlung. OCLC 84147744.

Metropolitan Museum of Art

- "Door lintel temple relief". The MET. The Metropolitan Museum of Art. n.d.
- "Head of a King, possibly Amememhat IV". The MET. The Metropolitan Museum of Art. n.d.
- "Statuette of a Late Middle Kingdom Queen". The MET. The Metropolitan Museum of Art. n.d.
- "Vessel fragment". The MET. The Metropolitan Museum of Art. n.d.

Museum of Fine Arts, Boston

- "Lower body fragment of a female statue seated on a throne". MFA. Museum of Fine Arts Boston. n.d.

The British Museum

- "EA16581". The British Museum. n.d.
- "EA117". The British Museum. n.d.
- "EA66159". The British Museum. n.d.

The Petrie Museum

- "LDUCE-UC14337". UCL Museums & Collections. The Petrie Museum. n.d.
- "LDUCE-UC32778". UCL Museums & Collections. The Petrie Museum. n.d.

=== Online ===
- Ilin-Tomich, Alexander (n.d.). "Persons and Names of the Middle Kingdom". Johannes Gutenberg Universität Mainz.

=== Royal titulary ===
- Burchardt, Max; Pieper, Max (1912). Handbuch der Aegyptischen Königsnamen (in German). Leipzig: J. C. Hindrichs. OCLC 1154955005.
- Gauthier, Henri (1907). Le livre des rois d'Égypte : recueil de titres et protocoles royaux, suivi d'un index alphabétique. Des origines à la fin de la XIIe dynastie (in French). Vol. 17. Cairo: l'Institut Français d'Archéologie Orientale. OCLC 600626180.
- Leprohon, Ronald J. (2013). The Great Name: Ancient Egyptian Royal Titulary. Writings from the ancient world. Vol. 33. Atlanta: Society of Biblical Literature. ISBN 978-1-58983-736-2.
- Newberry, Percy E. (1908). Scarabs : An Introduction to the Study of Egyptian Seals and Signet Rings. London: Archibald Constable and Co. Ltd. OCLC 1015423361.
- Petrie, Flinders (1917). Scarabs and Cylinders with names : illustrated by the Egyptian collection in University College, London. London: School of Archaeology in Egypt. OCLC 638808928.
- von Beckerath, Jürgen (1984a). Handbuch der ägyptischen Königsnamen (in German). München: Deutscher Kunstverlag. ISBN 9783422008328.
