= Statue of Sobekneferu =

Ancient Egyptian statue

- Bust of a woman, now identified as Sobekneferu; Berlin Egyptian Museum 14475
- Material: Greywacke
- Height: 14 cm (5.5 in)

The Statue of Sobekneferu was a sculpture of the ancient Egyptian queen Sobekneferu, who reigned during the 12th Dynasty.

The bust was bought in 1899 (inventory no. 14475). This bust is the first known statue of the queen with her face preserved. There are several statues known belonging to this ruling queen, however, all others are headless. The sculpture was kept in the Egyptian Museum of Berlin, but was lost during World War 2. The bust was around 14 cm high and made of greywacke. The identity of the woman shown was for a long time unknown, as the piece is uninscribed. The face of the woman shows clearly signs of age and dates therefore stylistically to the late Middle Kingdom, when most sculptures show people no longer ageless young as in other periods of Egyptian history. Today, the bust is known from photographic images, and also from preserved plaster casts.

The Egyptologist Biri Fay was able to locate the lower part of the statue. It is now in the Museum of Fine Arts in Boston (MFA 24.742, 21.4 cm high), but was once found in the temple of Taharqa in the Nubian fortress of Semna. The lower part of the statue is also uninscribed but shows on the throne the hieroglyphic signs uniting the two lands (zm3-t3wy). This is a royal symbol and only attested for kings. Therefore, this (now photographically united) statue shows a woman that ruled as king and must belong to Sobekneferu, the only ruling queen of the late Middle Kingdom.
