= Harageh =

Human settlement

Coordinates: 29°13′N 31°2′E

Harageh (also el-Harageh or Haraga) is a modern village in Egypt at the entrance to the river oasis of the Fayum, close to El Lahun.

== History ==
In archaeology, Harageh is mainly known for a series of cemeteries dating to several periods of Egyptian history. Reginald Engelbach excavated these cemeteries in 1913. The cemeteries belong to the Naqada period, the First Intermediate Period, the late Middle Kingdom, and the New Kingdom; a few Coptic stelae were also discovered here.

There is a small Naqada culture cemetery that also included pottery of the Maadi-Buto culture. To the end of the First Intermediate Period or early Middle KIngdom belong to decorated tomb chambers, one belonging to a man called Heryshefnakht and the other to a woman called Wadjet-hetep.

=== Middle Bronze Age ===
==== Middle Kingdom period ====
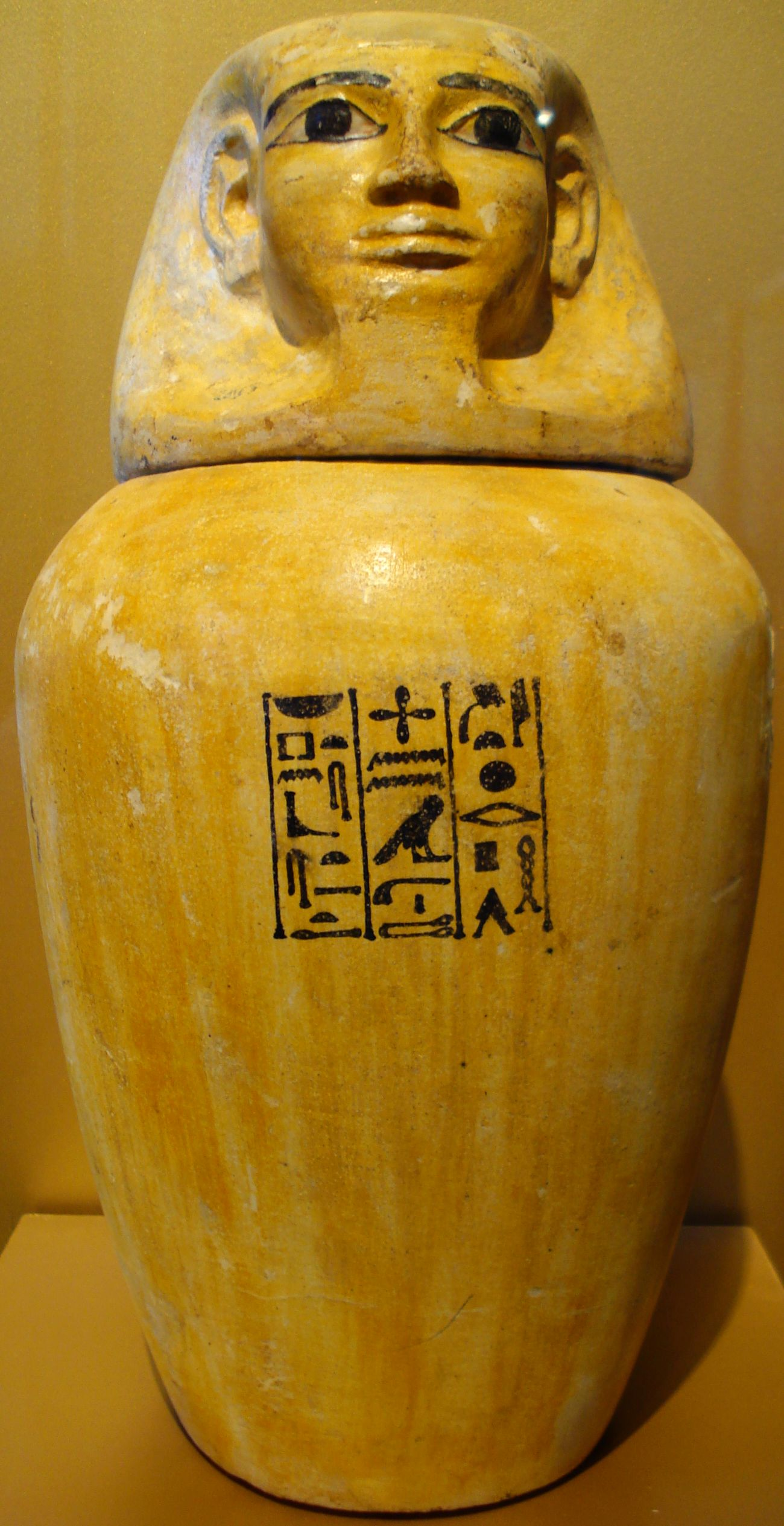
Canopic jar of Senebtisi, found at Harageh

The burials of the late Middle Kingdom appear to have belonged to wealthy individuals. The inhabitants of El Lahun may have been buried here. Engelbach found stelae, including the only one known to be dedicated to the god Hedjhotep, as well as inscribed coffins, canopic boxes and jars, and many statues.

- A limestone Canopic Jar of Senebtisi found at Harageh. Lady Senebtisi of Harageh is a different individual than Senebtisi buried at Lisht. Her limestone canopic jars were excavated by the British School of Archaeology in Egypt (under Reginald Engelbach) from Tomb 92 at Harageh during the 1913–1914 season, and subsequently acquired by the Brooklyn Museum.
- A papyrus discovered in Harageh mentions a site called Sekhem Sobekneferu, believed to be the burial place of Queen Sobekneferu.
- P. Harageh 3: A papyrus dated to Year 2 of an unnamed king.

== Literature ==
- R. Engelbach: Harageh, London 1923 online
