= Reginald Engelbach =

English Egyptologist and engineer

- Born: 9 July 1888; Moretonhampstead, England
- Died: 26 February 1946 (aged 57); Cairo, Egypt
- Occupation: Egyptologist
- Known for: Cairo Museum register
- Spouse: Nancy Lambert

Reginald "Rex" Engelbach (9 July 1888 – 26 February 1946) was an English Egyptologist and engineer. He is mainly known for his works in the Egyptian Museum of Cairo, above all the compilation of a register of artifacts belonging of the museum.

== Biography ==
Initially trained in engineering, Engelbach had to discontinue his studies in 1908 due to a long illness; in 1909-10 he went to convalesce in Egypt where he became fascinated by ancient Egyptian culture. In 1911 he started a collaboration with Sir Flinders Petrie as his assistant, excavating in various places such as Heliopolis, Riqqeh and Harageh. He later excavated in the Near East too.
He was married in 1915 and in 1920-21, 2 years after World War I, he resumed working with Petrie in his excavation at El-Lahun and Abu Gorab. He subsequently earned a remarkable number of charges and awards and began working at the Cairo Museum. His career, formed on both field and museum, culminated with the creation of the Register of the antiquities in the Cairo Museum. He died in Cairo on 26 February 1946.

== Significant works ==
- 1946. Introduction to Egyptian Archaeology. With special references to the Egyptian Museum, Cairo (ed)
- 1931. Index of Egyptian and Sudanese Sites from which the Cairo Museum contains Antiquities
- 1930. Ancient Egyptian Masonry, with Somers Clarke
- 1927. Gurob, with Guy Brunton
- 1924. A Supplement to the Topographical Catalogue of the Private Tombs of Thebes, nos. 253-254. With some notes on the Necropolis from 1913 to 1924
- 1923. Harageh, with Battiscombe Gunn
- 1923. The problem of the Obelisks, from a study of the unfinished Obelisk at Aswan
- 1922. The Aswân Obelisk, with some remarks on ancient engineering
- 1915. Riqqeh and Memphis VI, with chapters by M.A. Murray, H. Petrie and W.M.F. Petrie
