= Riqqeh =

- Location in Egypt
- Coordinates: 29°26′N 31°13′E
- Country: Egypt
- Governorate: Giza
- Time zone: UTC+2 (EET)
  - Summer (DST): UTC+3 (EEST)

Riqqeh (also known as ar-Riqqeh or Riqqa) is a modern village in Egypt. It is located about 80 km south of Cairo.

== Overview ==
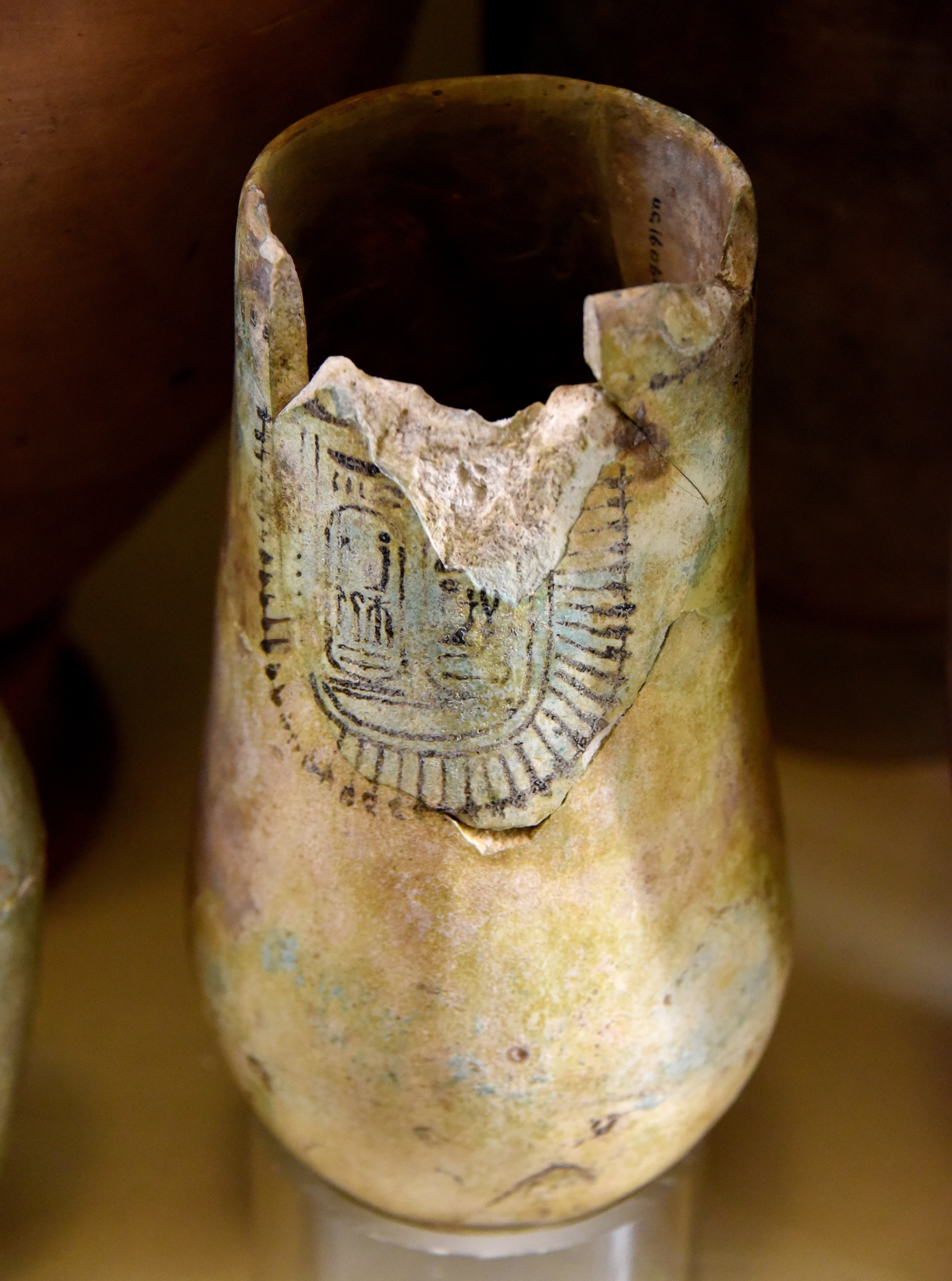
Jar inscribed with the prenomen and nomen of Amenmesse. Faience, cylindrical. 19th Dynasty. From Cemetery C at el-Riqqeh, Egypt. The Petrie Museum of Egyptian Archaeology, London

Close to the village, in the desert, was excavated a series of cemeteries. The cemeteries range in time from the Gerzeh culture to modern times. Most important are those tombs dating to the Gerzeh (named for the El Gerzeh cemetery) and those of the Middle and New Kingdoms. The cemeteries were excavated and published by Reginald Engelbach in 1912 to 1913.

Most of the tombs found were simple shafts, some with one or more chambers at the bottom. Finds include steles, statues and canopic jars. From the Middle Kingdom some well preserved and decorated coffins are preserved. Most remarkable was an undisturbed tomb containing two skeletons and golden jewellery. A closer look revealed that one of the skeletons was of the person buried here, while the other one was a tomb robber, killed when the roof of the tomb chamber collapsed while he was looting the mummy.

== Literature ==
- R. Engelbach, M. A. Murray, Flinders Petrie, W. M. Flinders Petrie: Riqqeh and Memphis VI, (British School of Archaeology in Egypt and Egyptian Research Account Nineteenth Year, 1913), London 1915, online as pdf
- J. Richards: Society and Death in Ancient Egypt, Cambridge 2005, S. 98–106, 118-124 ISBN 0-521-84033-3

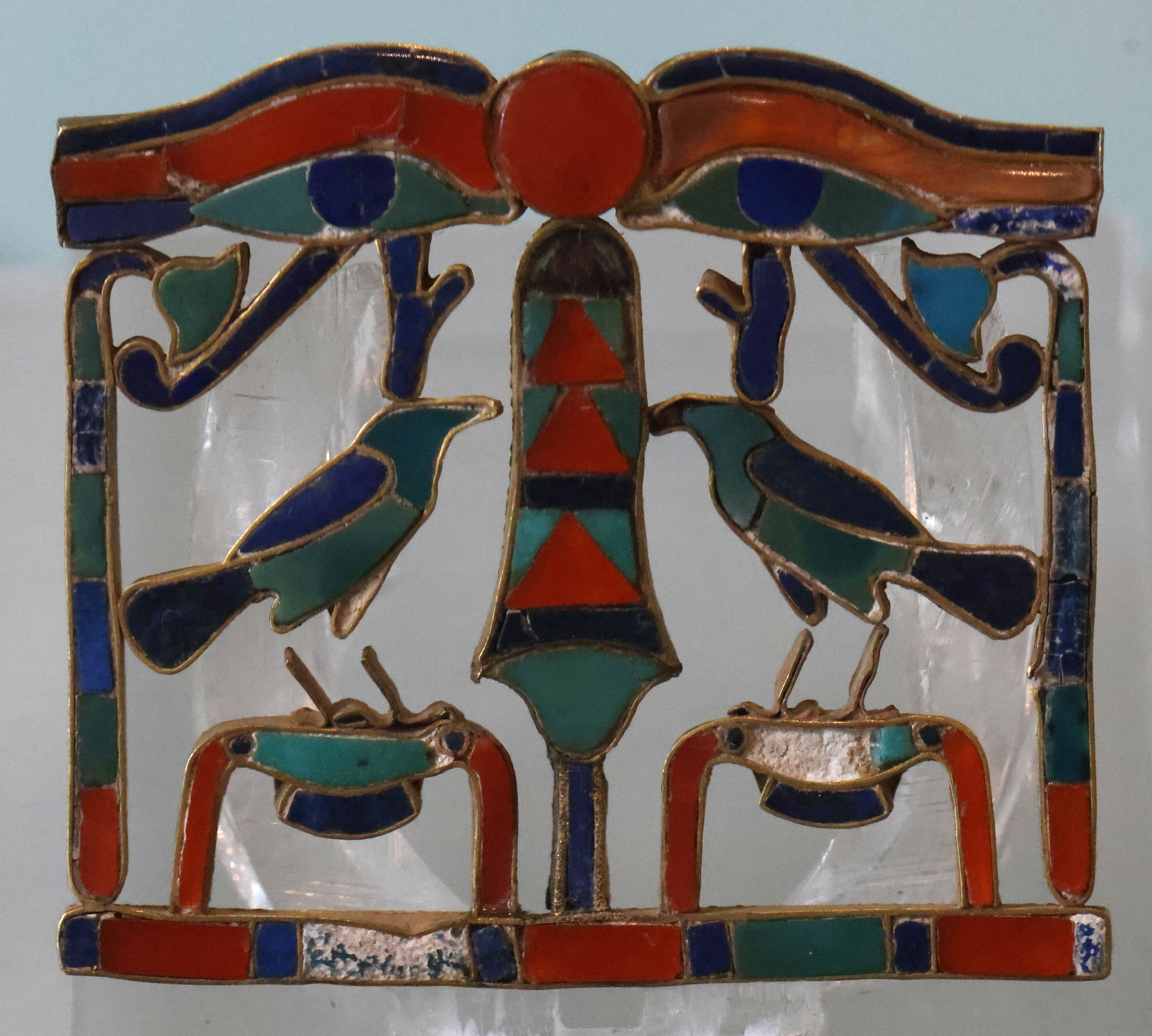
A 12th dynasty pectoral found in a Riqqeh tomb
