= Amun-Her-Khepesh-Ef (son of Senusret III) =

Ancient Egyptian prince

Egyptian name
i mn n D2 Z1 F23 A51jmn ḥr ḫpš.f
"Amun is with His Strong Arm"
- Born: c. 1885 BC
- Died: c. 1883 BC (aged c. 2)
- Burial: 1945; Middlebury Cemetery, Vermont, United States

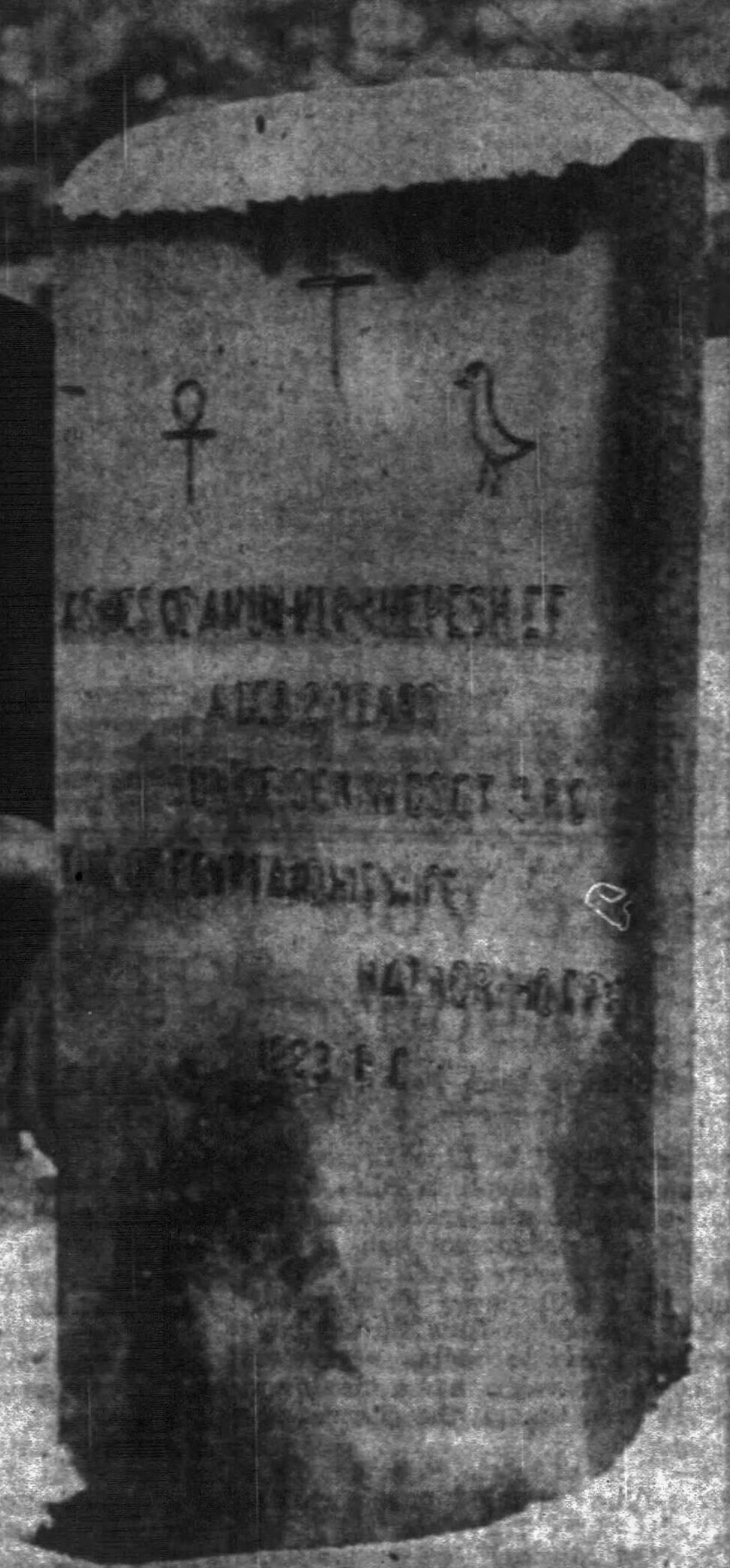
The original headstone of Amun-Her-Khepesh-Ef, in Middlebury Cemetery, in 1951

Amun-Her-Khepesh-Ef ("Amun Is with His Strong Arm") (c. 1885 BC – c. 1883 BC) was the supposed son of King Senusret III and Hathorhotep and is notable for being buried in Middlebury, Vermont, in the United States and is the earliest death date recorded on an American tombstone, and one of the very few with a death date in BC. However, his identity has never been confirmed, and the putrid state of his now cremated remains negates the possibility of any exhumation. Senusret III and Hathorhotep were not known to have married and it is possible that Hathorhotep was Senusret's own granddaughter.

Amun-Her-Khepesh-Ef was said to have died at the age of two and was interred in Egypt, likely Dahshur. His mummy was stolen by graverobbers and purchased by Henry Sheldon from some visiting Spanish sailors in New York City in 1886 for display in his museum, the Henry Sheldon Museum of Vermont History. However, the mummy arrived in such poor condition that it was relegated to the attic. Sheldon died in 1907, and it remained there until 1945, when a curator named George Mead came across it. It was suggested that the mummy should be thrown out, but Mead gave it a proper burial. Fearing that the mummy might be dug up by student pranksters if buried whole, he had it cremated in his neighbor's furnace and interred in his family plot, with a suitable headstone.

His original headstone read "ASHES OF AMUN-HER-KHEPESH-EF AGED 2 YEARS SON OF SEN WOSET 3 RD [sic] KING OF EGYPT AND HIS WIFE HATHOR-HOTPE [sic] 1883 BC". An ankh, Christian cross, and a quail chick hieroglyph (G43) are carved near the top of the stone.

In 2023, the original gravestone was replaced with a new one. Amun-Her-Khepesh-Ef's grave is next to that of Caroline Hawley, the first wife of George Mead and near that of Vermont Representative Daniel Chipman. Due to the sheer novelty of having an Ancient Egyptian buried in a charming but otherwise unremarkable Vermont town, the gravestone is a local landmark and the subject of frequent visits and offerings of gifts, often children's toys like die-cast cars and vinyl animal figurines.
