= Hathorhotep =

Twelfth Dynasty Ancient Egyptian princess

- Burial place: Black Pyramid, Giza, Egypt

Hathorhotep was an ancient Egyptian king's daughter at the end of the Twelfth Dynasty during the Middle Kingdom. Her father might have been Amenemhat III.

== Attestation ==
Hathorhotep (ḥwt-ḥr(w)-ḥtp; Hathor (goddess) + Hotep "pleased/satisfied/at peace") is only known from one object.

=== Canopic Vase ===
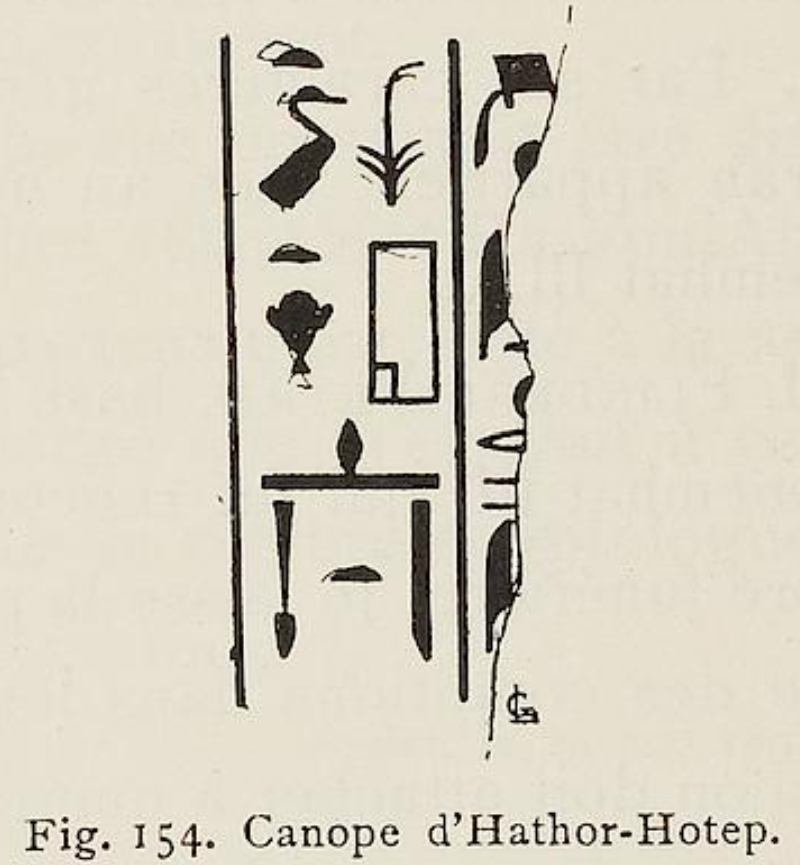
Inscription on a Fragmentary Canopic Vase belonging to Hathorhotep

At Dahshur, Hathorhotep is only known from a fragmentary canopic vase with her name and title found in Black Pyramid. The vase may indicate that she was buried in the pyramid, and thus might be a daughter of Amenemhat III.

==== Incomplete Hieroglyphs ====
The inscription on the fragment shows a special type of "incomplete hieroglyphs" (see Miniachi 2010). That means that animals are shown without legs, to stop the animals represented by the hieroglyphs from attacking the deceased. This type of writing was only used from the reign of Amenemhat III (late Twelfth Dynasty) onward into the Thirteenth Dynasty at the end of the Middle Kingdom. The key tomb for incomplete hieroglyphs is the tomb of king Awibre Hor in the 13th dynasty, buried next to the Pyramid of Amenemhat III. Therefore, it is also possible that Hathorhotep was the daughter of another, later king.

== Known children ==
- Amun-Her-Khepesh-Ef
