= Tomb of Sarenput I =

Ancient Egyptian tomb at Qubbet el-Hawa

- Burial site of Sarenput I
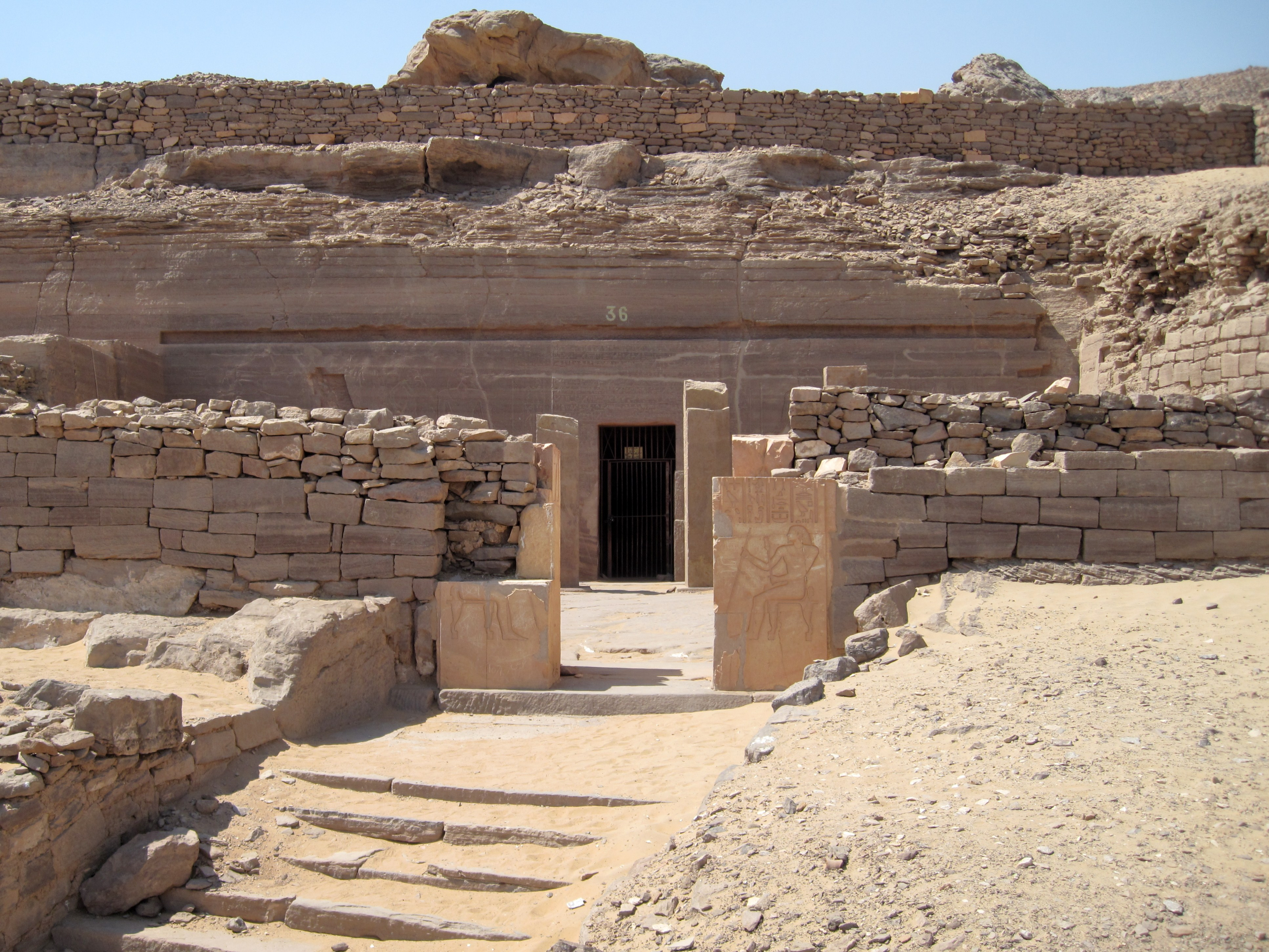
- Exterior of the tomb of Sarenput I at Qubbet el-Hawa.
- Location: Qubbet el-Hawa, near Aswan, Egypt
- Excavated by: Francis Grenfell, 1st Baron Grenfell; Italian Archaeological Mission directed by Ernesto Schiaparelli
- Decoration: Sunk reliefs outside and paintings inside
- Layout: Rock-cut funerary complex with courtyard, porticoed facade, funerary chapel, shafts and burial chambers

The tomb of Sarenput I, also identified as QH36, is an ancient Egyptian rock-cut tomb in the necropolis of Qubbet el-Hawa, on the west bank of the Nile, near Aswan, Egypt. The complex belonged to Sarenput I, governor of Elephantine and holder of the first nome of Upper Egypt during the reign of the pharaoh Senusret I. The tomb is considered one of the most important monuments of the necropolis for its size, reliefs, paintings and inscriptions.

== Owner ==
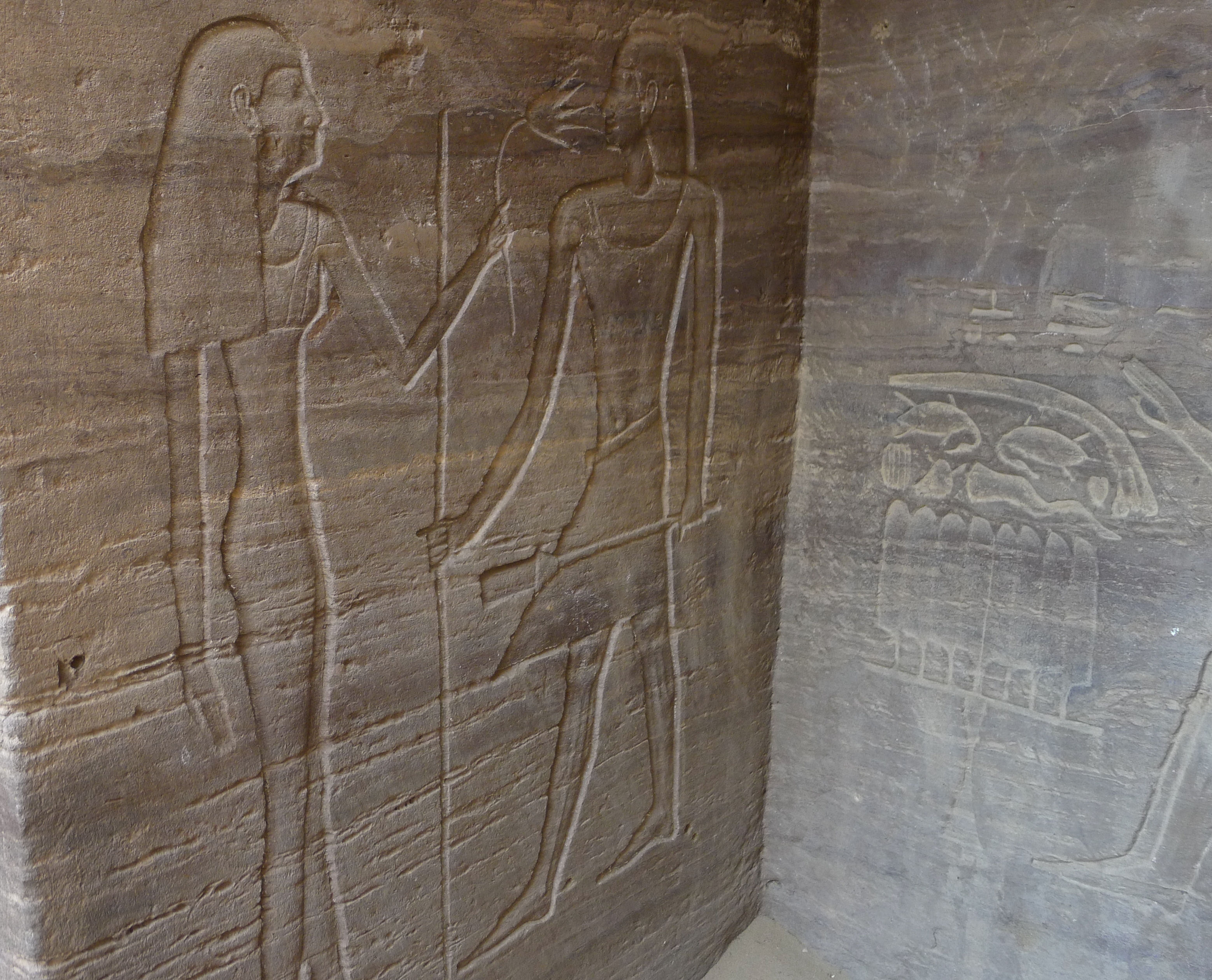
Sarenput I receives a flower in his tomb.

The tomb was intended for Sarenput I, a provincial official of the Twelfth Dynasty and governor of the first nome of Upper Egypt under Senusret I. Sarenput I held titles connected with local administration and the southern frontier, including nomarch, mayor of Elephantine, overseer of the priests of Satis, overseer of foreign lands and offices connected with Nubia. Among the most important duties of the governors of this nome were control of the trade routes of the Nubian frontier and supervision of the royal granite quarries of the region.

The biographical inscriptions of the tomb recall Sarenput I's role in the Nubian policy of Senusret I and the royal favour received by the owner. In the inner version of the inscription, the cartouche of Senusret I appears in the sentence in which the owner states that he built his tomb through royal favour, whereas the cartouche is absent from the version carved on the facade.

== History ==
=== Construction and original use ===
The construction of the funerary complex is placed in the Middle Kingdom, during the Twelfth Dynasty, the period in which Sarenput I was active under Senusret I. The ceramic material studied in shaft 9 is dated to the Middle Kingdom and mostly to the Twelfth Dynasty, a chronology that matches the construction phase of the funerary complex. The same shaft produced no material later than the Middle Kingdom, unlike other shafts in the necropolis of Qubbet el-Hawa.

The tomb is located in the northern part of the necropolis, on an upper terrace of the hill and not far from the tomb of Heqaib, a governor of the Sixth Dynasty who was deified after his death. The position of the tomb and the richness of its decoration reflect the rank of its owner within the elite of Elephantine. The inscriptions of the tomb mention craftsmen from the royal Residence employed in the construction of the complex; this evidence has been connected with the architectural planning of the tomb, the materials used and the archaeological data obtained during the 2022 excavations.

After its original use in the Middle Kingdom, the tomb went through phases of reoccupation, reuse and robbery in the New Kingdom and in the Late Period; the owners of the secondary burials are not currently known.

=== Excavation and documentation ===
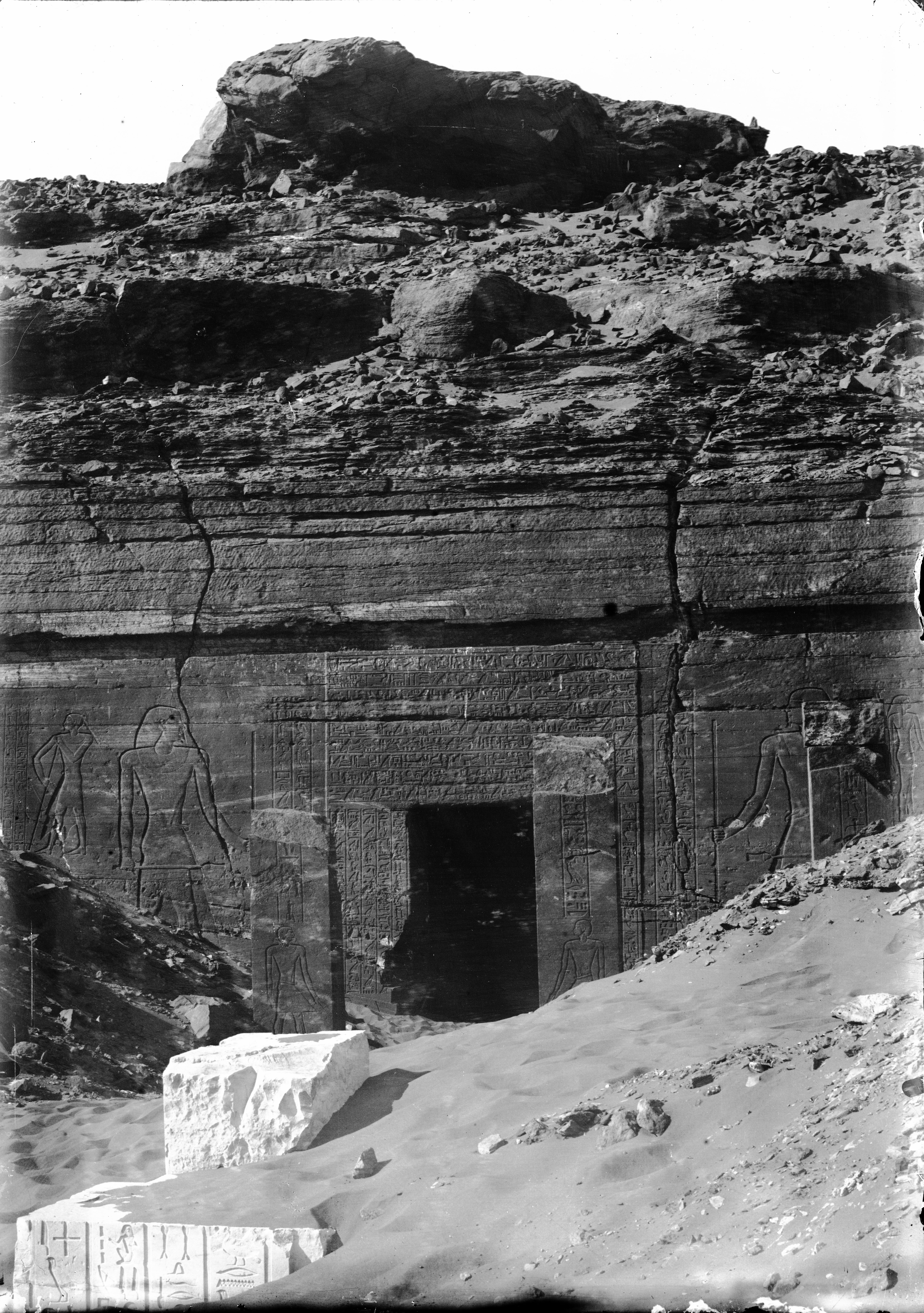
Entrance still partly covered by sand. Schiaparelli excavations, 1914 (C01557).

The first archaeological investigations on the hill of Qubbet el-Hawa are connected with Francis Grenfell, who began the first archaeological campaign in the necropolis in 1885. At that stage, tombs of the Sixth and Twelfth Dynasties were documented and numbered from QH25 to QH36, including the tomb of Sarenput I. Between 1886 and 1887 the tomb was cleared by Grenfell, after which its inscriptions became the subject of numerous publications and discussions.

In the twentieth century, Hans Wolfgang Müller studied several Middle Kingdom funerary complexes at Qubbet el-Hawa, including QH30, QH31, QH32 and QH36. For QH36 he described the access door, the outer courtyard, the portico of the facade and the niches at the ends of the space, also proposing a hypothetical reconstruction of the wall and entrance door.

In 1914 the Italian Archaeological Mission directed by Ernesto Schiaparelli documented the tomb through a series of photographs preserved in the Photographic Archive of the Museo Egizio in Turin. The series includes images of the entrance still partly covered by sand, the courtyard, the facade, the access to the rock-cut chambers, the pillared hall and an inscribed wall. The same archival record is also associated with a detailed photograph of an interior wall, dated to 1903-1913 and coming from the Museum of Anthropology of the University of Turin.

Since 2012 the Qubbet el-Hawa Project of the University of Jaén has resumed the study of tomb QH36. Modern research has documented the existence of nine funerary shafts in the complex, whereas Jacques de Morgan had recorded two and Müller seven. At the time of the publication of the 2023 study, only shafts 7 and 9 had been fully excavated, so the conclusions on the complex remained provisional until the completion of the investigations.

== Description ==
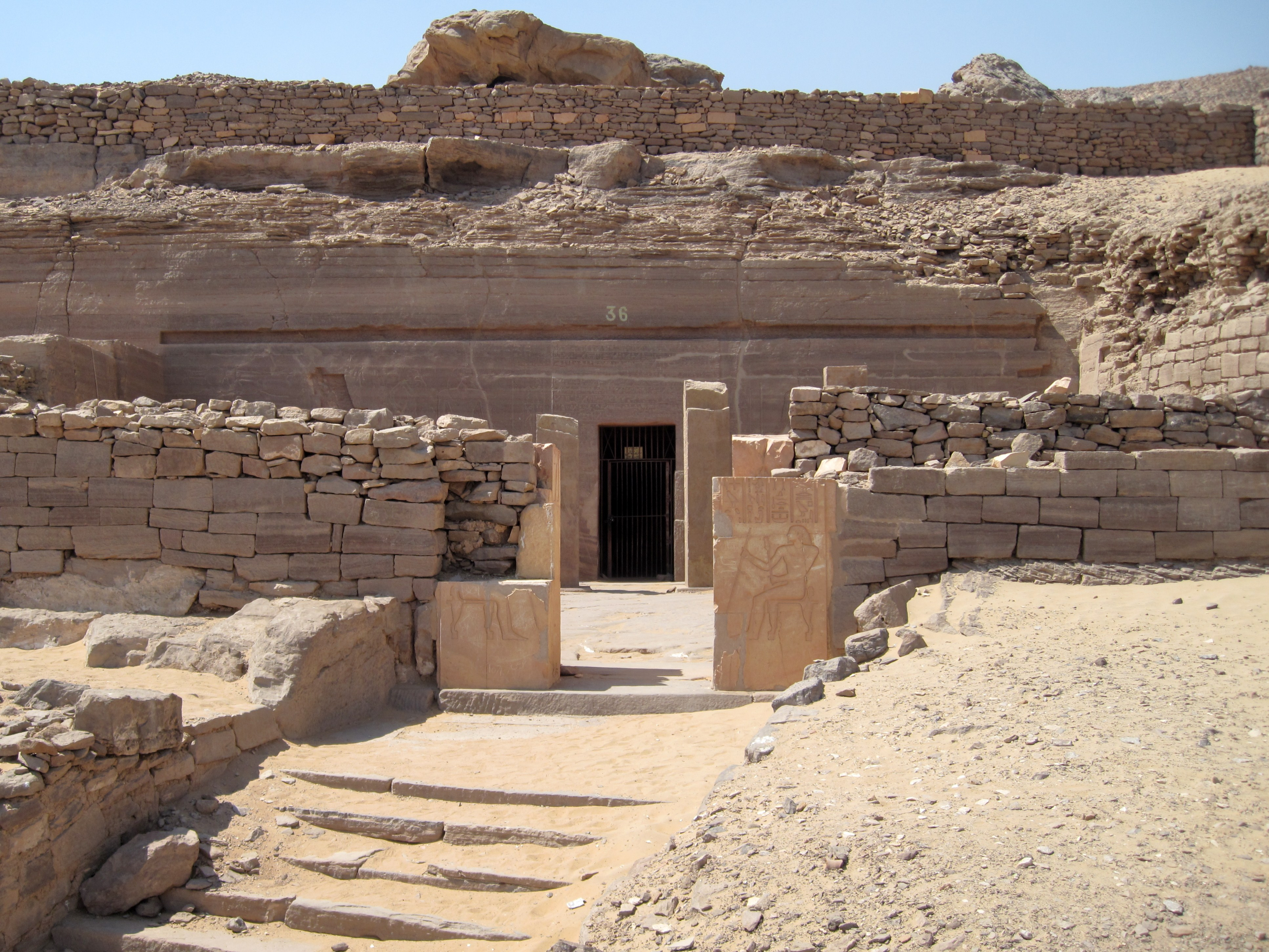
Exterior of the tomb of Sarenput I at Qubbet el-Hawa in 2011.

QH36 is a large rock-cut funerary complex dug into the hill of Qubbet el-Hawa. The complex includes three rooms connected by passages; the first two rooms have colonnades, while the innermost room had a niche intended to hold a statue of the owner.

Functionally, the complex was divided into a public area, consisting of an outer wall, monumental doorway, courtyard, porticoed facade and funerary chapel, and a private area, formed by shafts and underground chambers intended for burials. The public part included a pillared hall and a cult chamber connected by a vaulted corridor.

=== Exterior ===
The tomb is decorated outside with sunk reliefs and inside with paintings.

The exterior reliefs depict Sarenput I with members of his family and with his dogs. A difference in quality has been noted between the reliefs of the outer jambs, which are finer and may have been executed by a royal sculptor, and those of the facade, which are rougher and probably attributable to local production. The involvement of craftsmen connected with the royal Residence has also been argued from the architectural type of the tomb, the reliefs, the paintings and the materials used in its construction.

Exterior of tomb QH36 during the Schiaparelli excavations of 1914

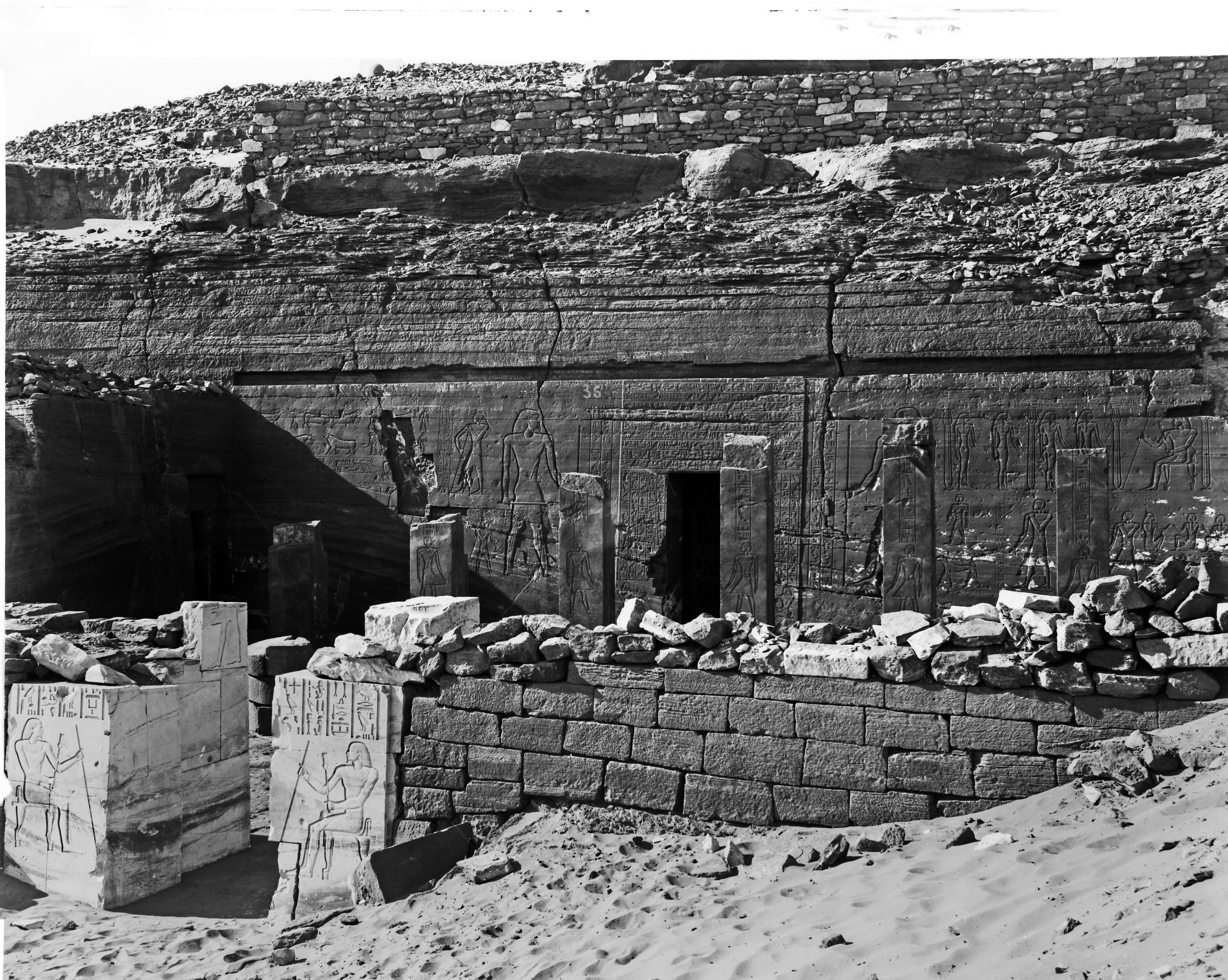
Courtyard and facade after the removal of the sand (E00346).

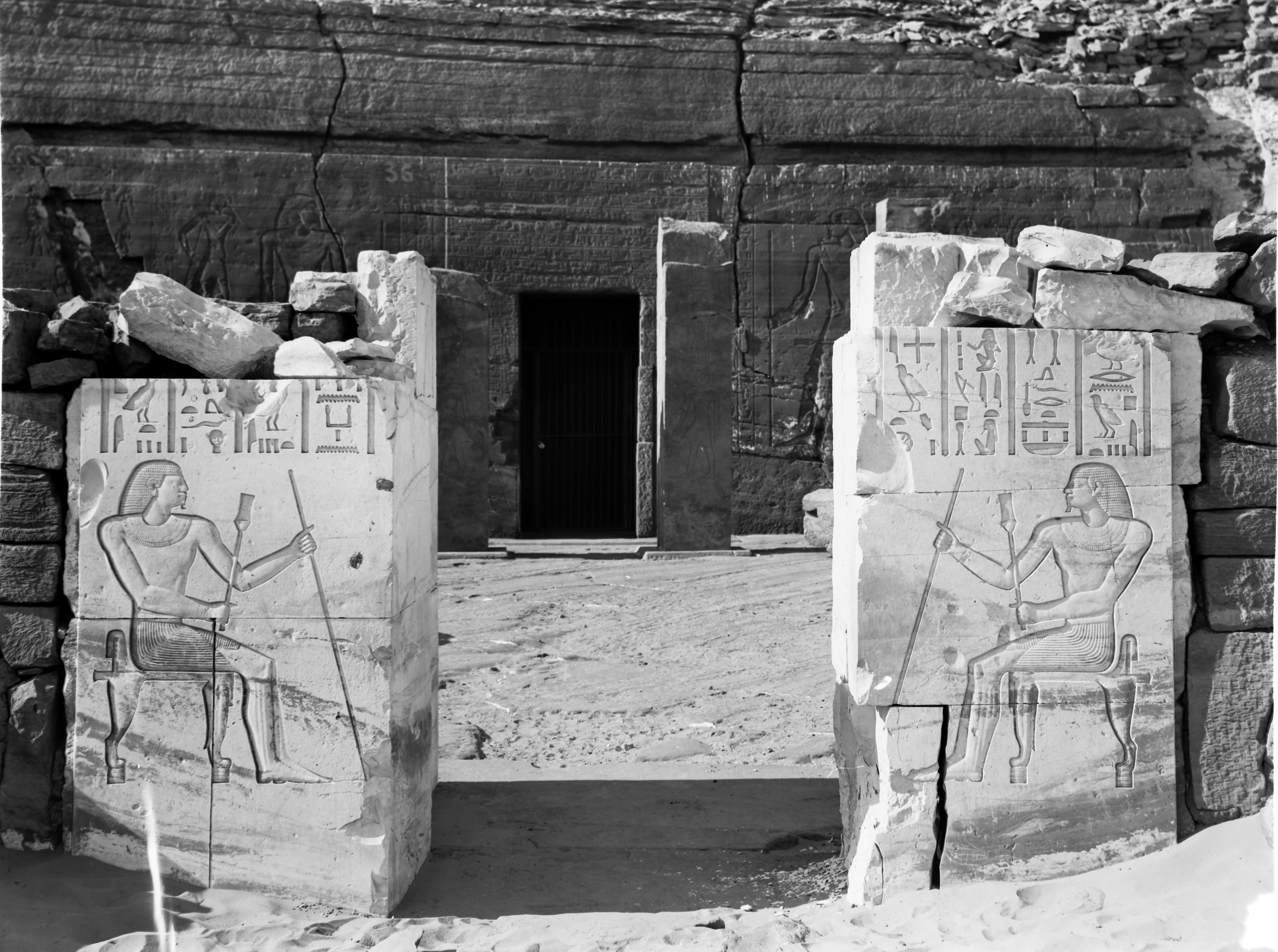
Access from the courtyard to the rock-cut chambers (E00342).

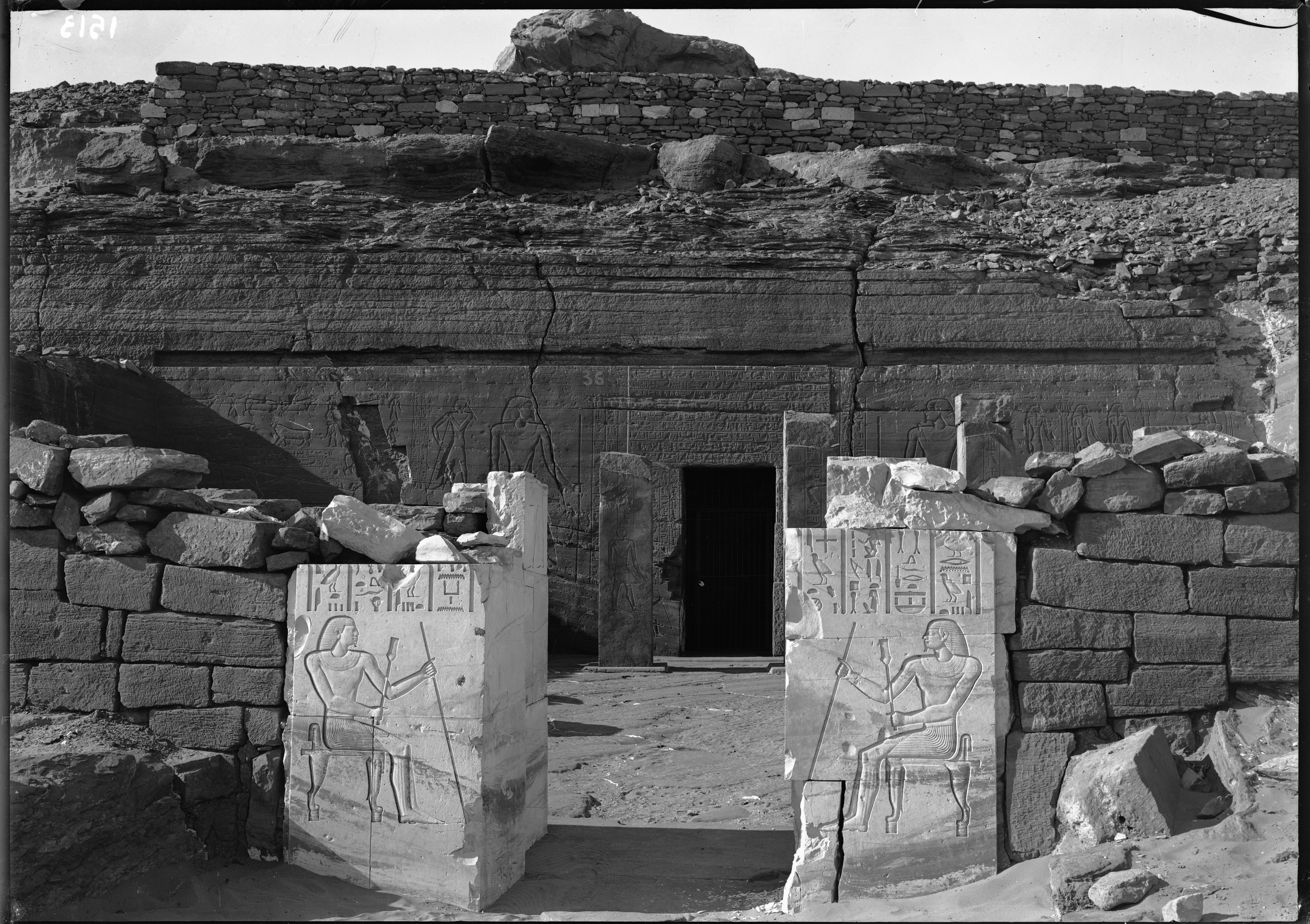
Entrance to the courtyard, close view (C01513).

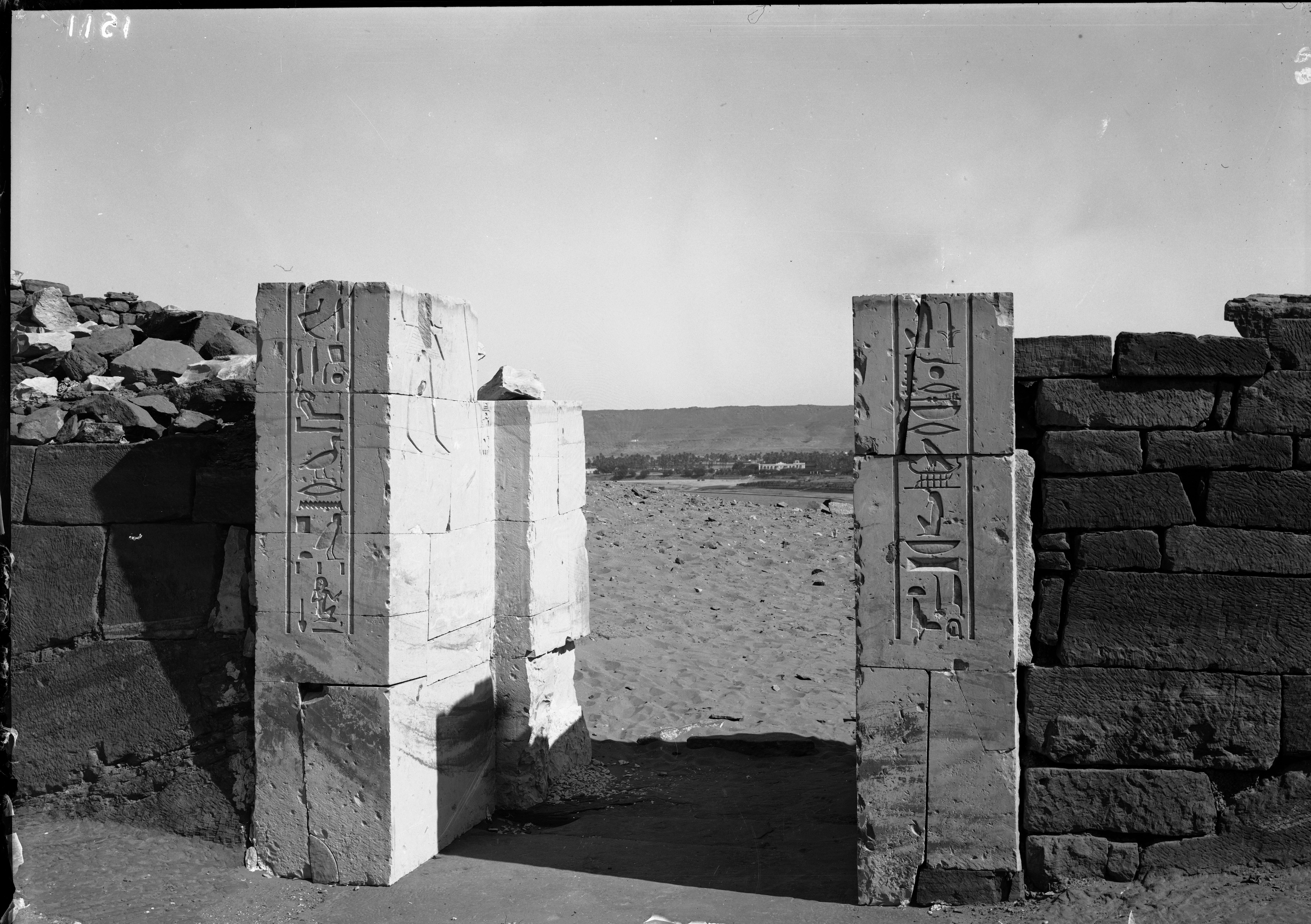
View towards the Nile and Aswan from the entrance to the courtyard (C01511).

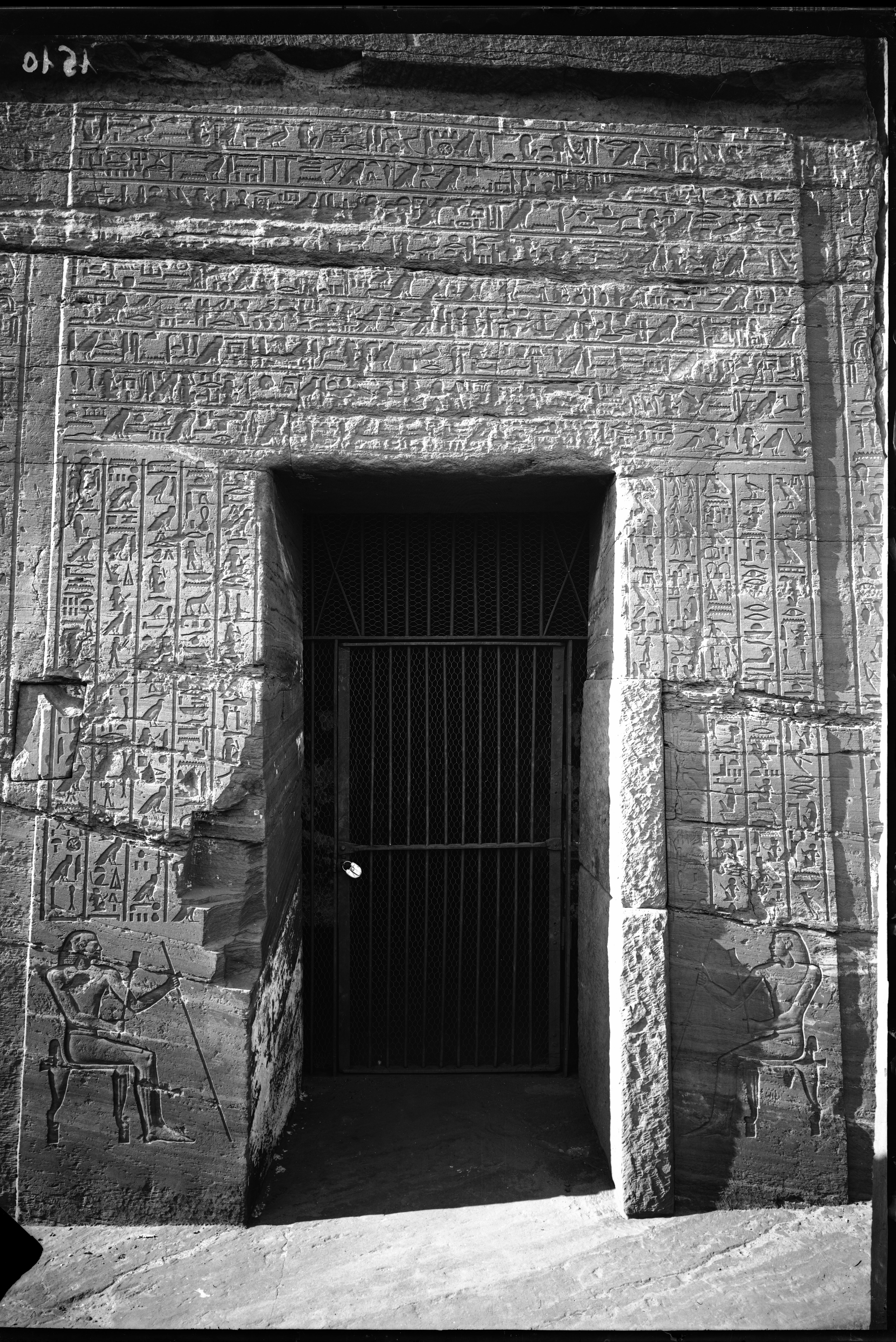
Entrance to the chambers cut into the rock (C01510).

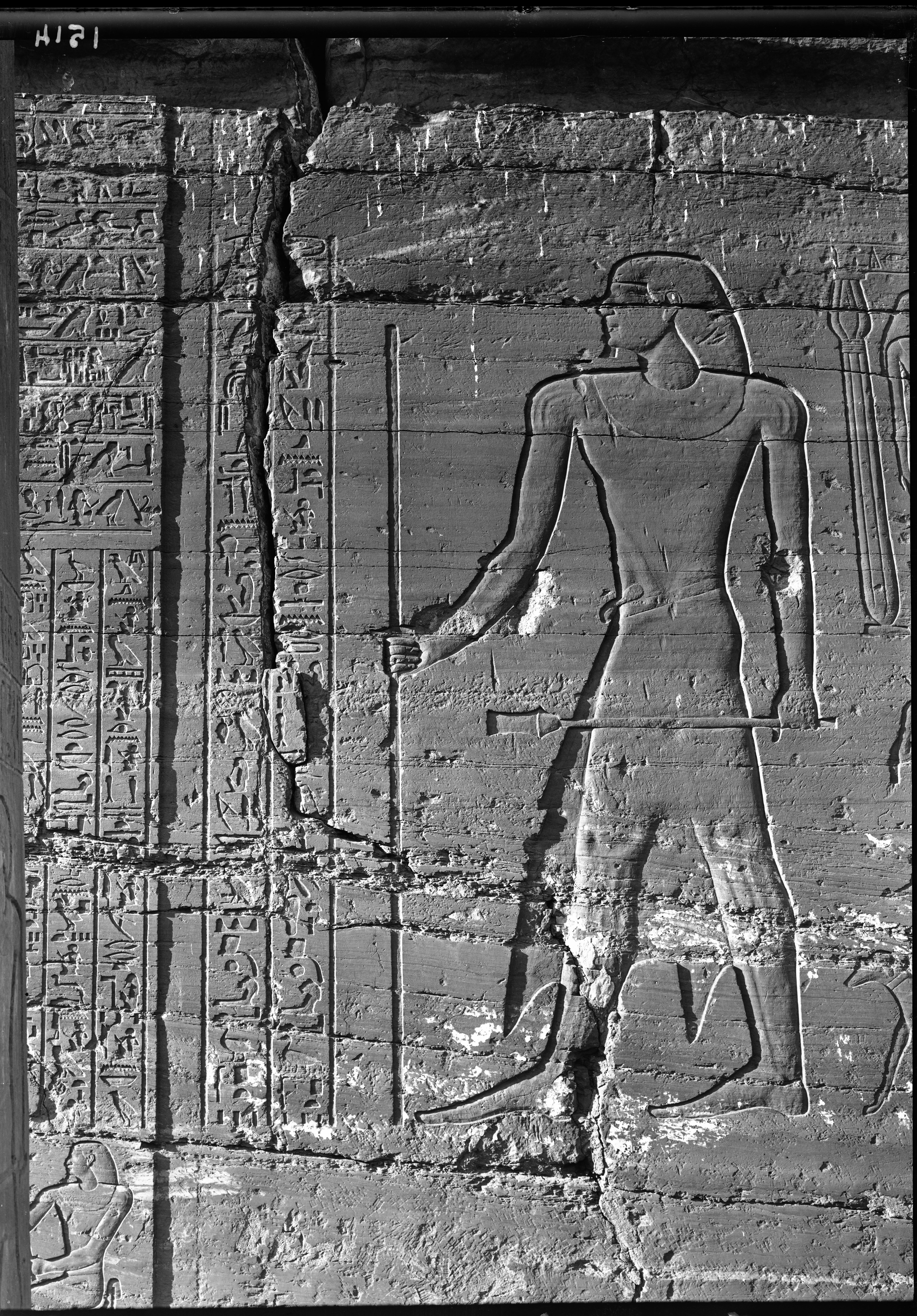
Northern facade, to the right of the entrance (C01514).

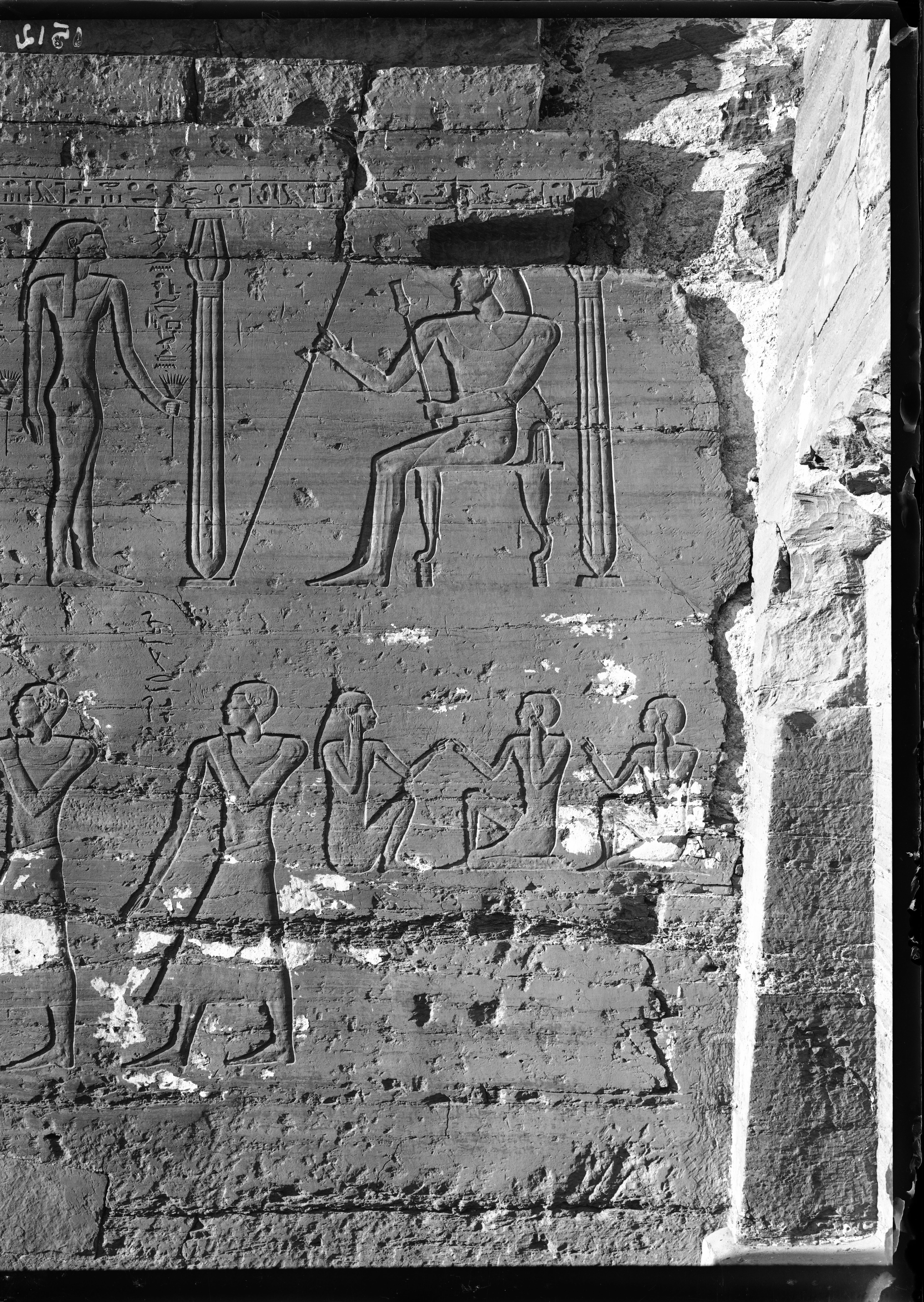
Detail of the northern facade (C01512).

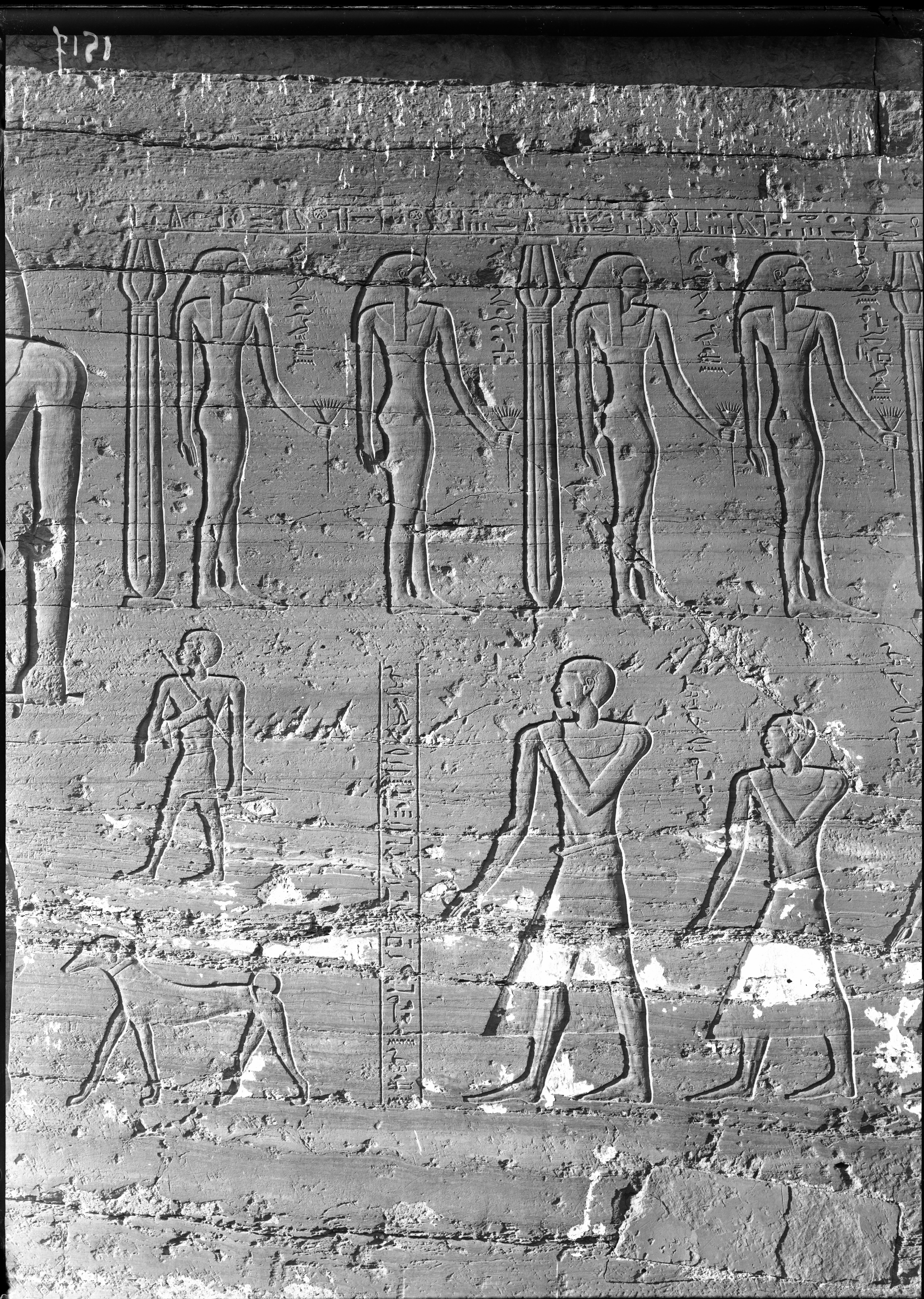
Northern facade, further detail (C01517).

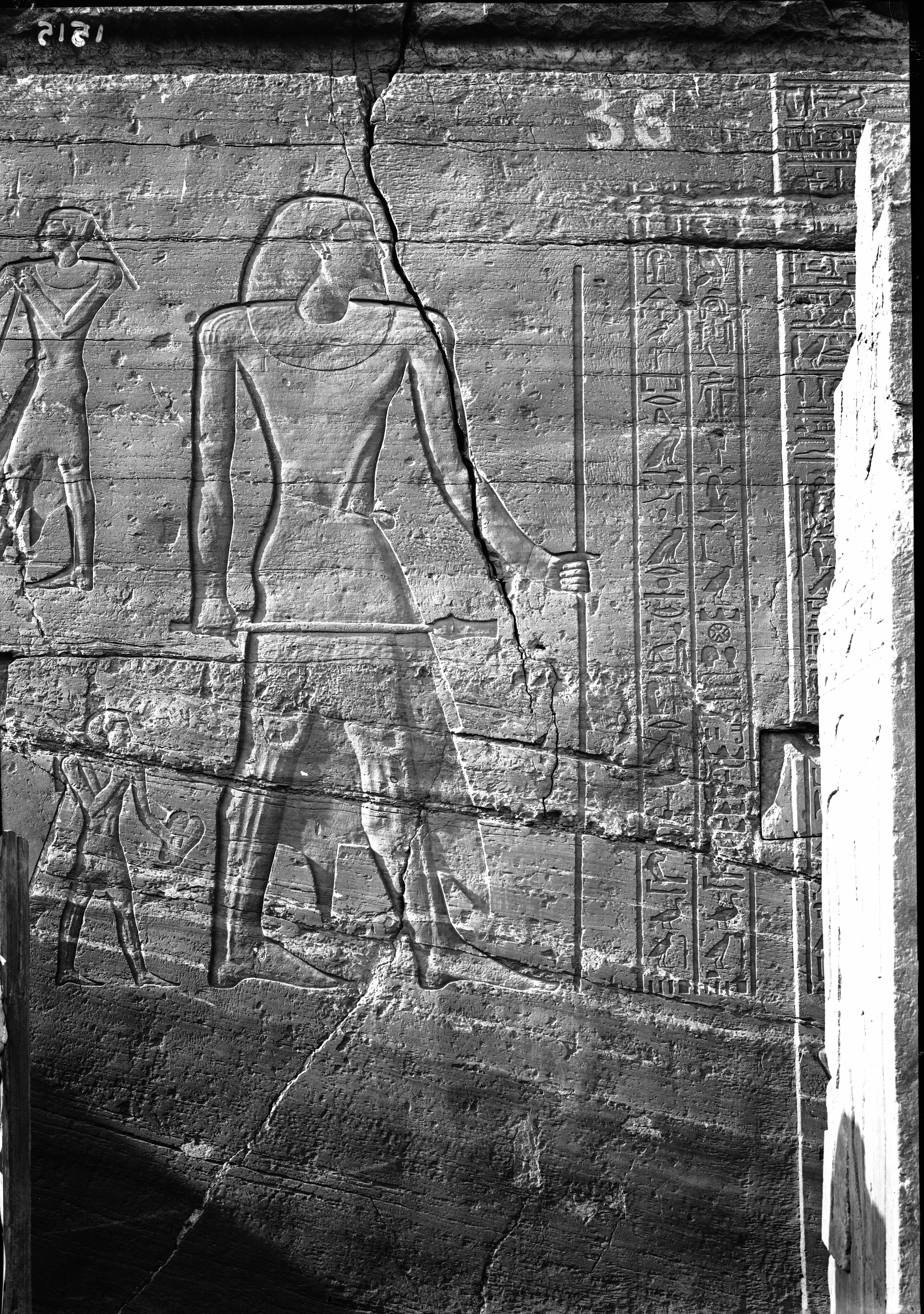
Southern facade, to the left of the entrance (C01515).

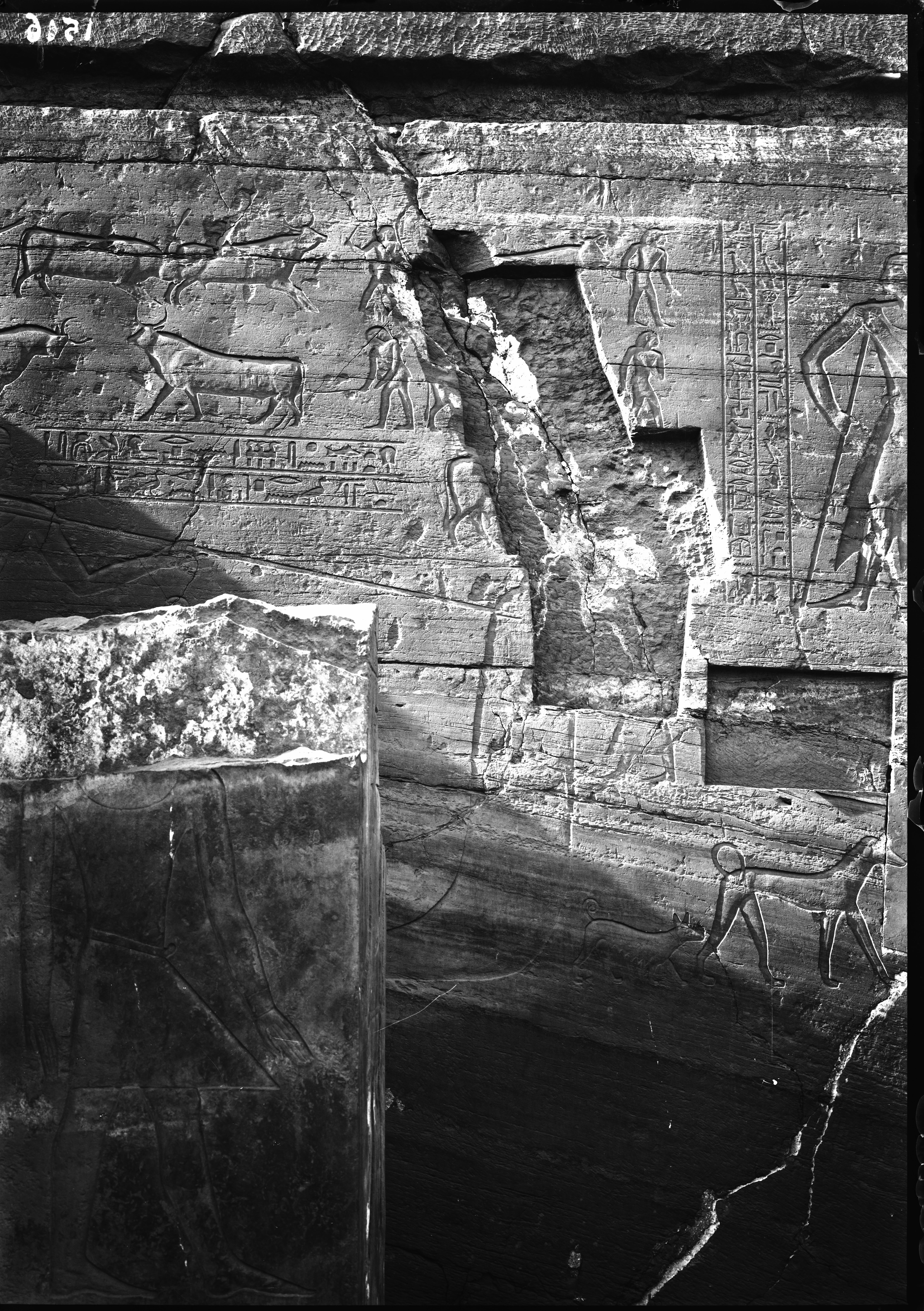
Detail of the southern facade (C01516).

=== Interior ===
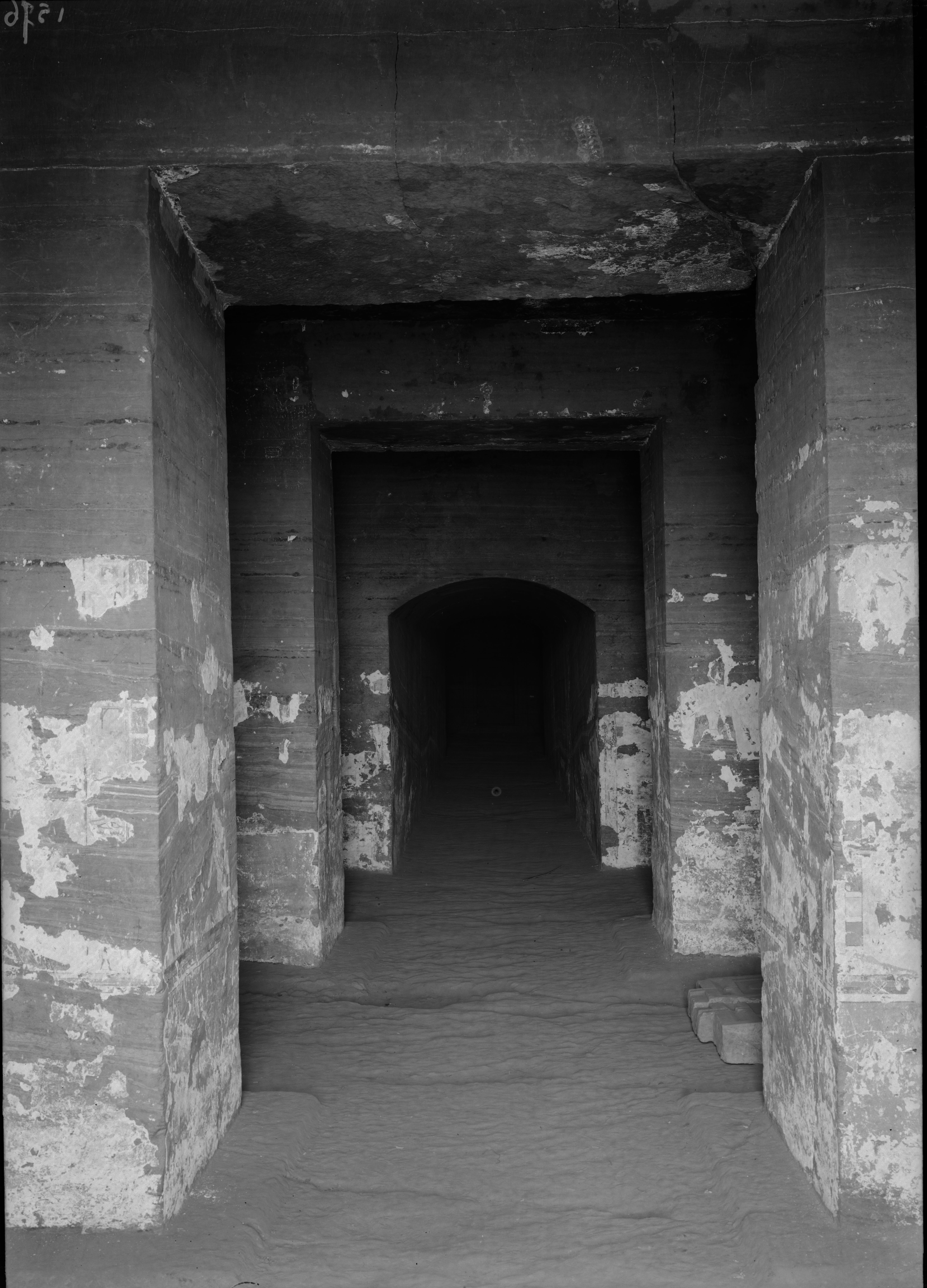
Pillared hall with offering table. Schiaparelli excavations, 1914 (C01576).

The tomb is one of the richest and best preserved in the necropolis, with scenes carved on the facade and paintings inside. Among the surviving interior paintings is a scene in which the owner appears with the god Khnum, an iconography regarded as significant because it is rare in a private tomb of this period.

The photographs in the Photographic Archive of the Museo Egizio document a pillared hall, in which an offering table is visible, and the northern part of the eastern wall of the same hall, which is inscribed.

The tomb preserves a long biographical inscription in two versions: the first is carved on the facade, while the second is painted in the first chamber. The two versions are identified as inscription A, for the facade text, and inscription B, for the inner text. The two versions transmit the same biographical text, but they are not identical in the writing and arrangement of the signs. The inner version writes the terms more fully, whereas the facade version tends to condense them.

Interior, inscriptions and decoration of tomb QH36

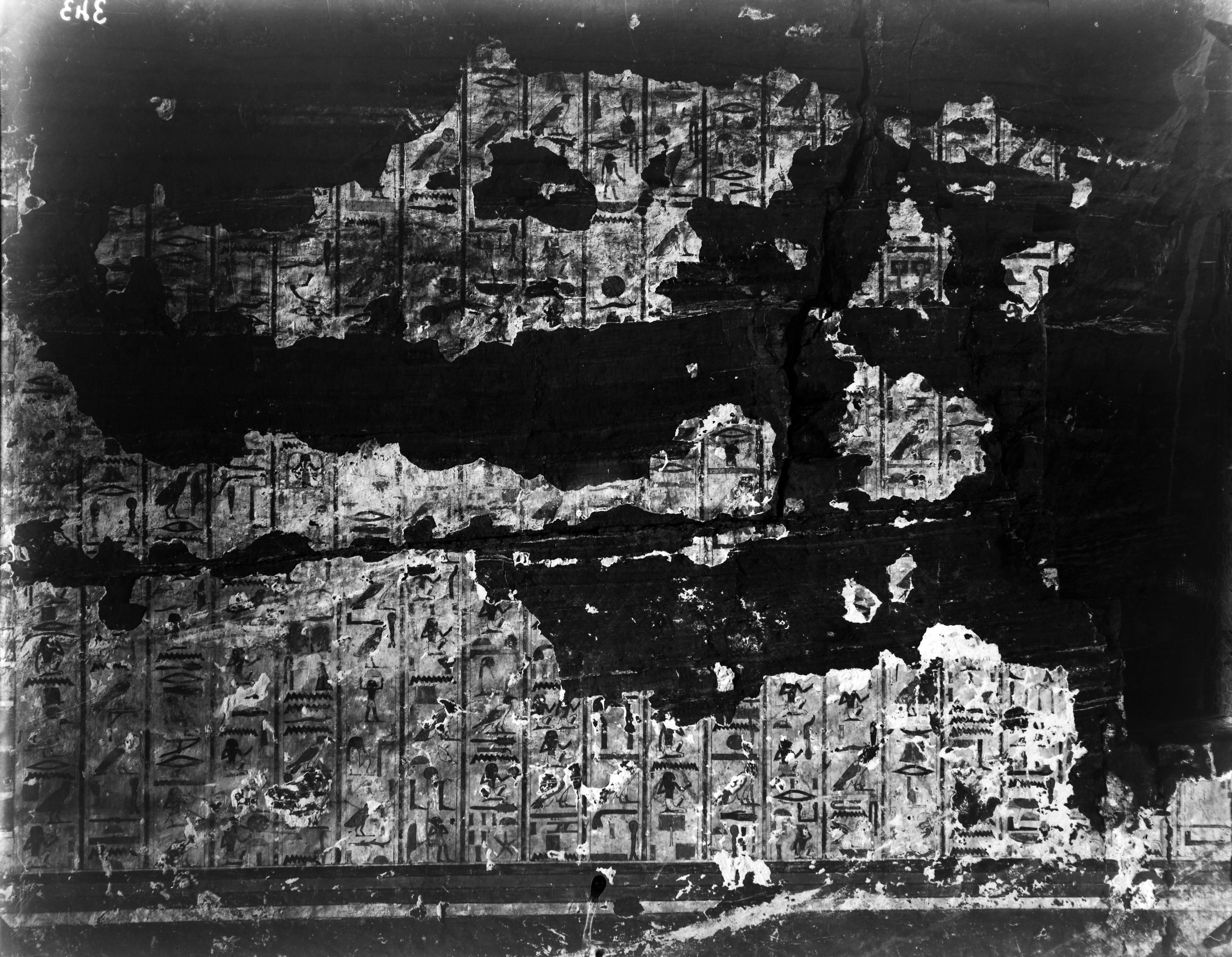
Inscribed east wall, northern side of the pillared hall, 1914 (E00343).

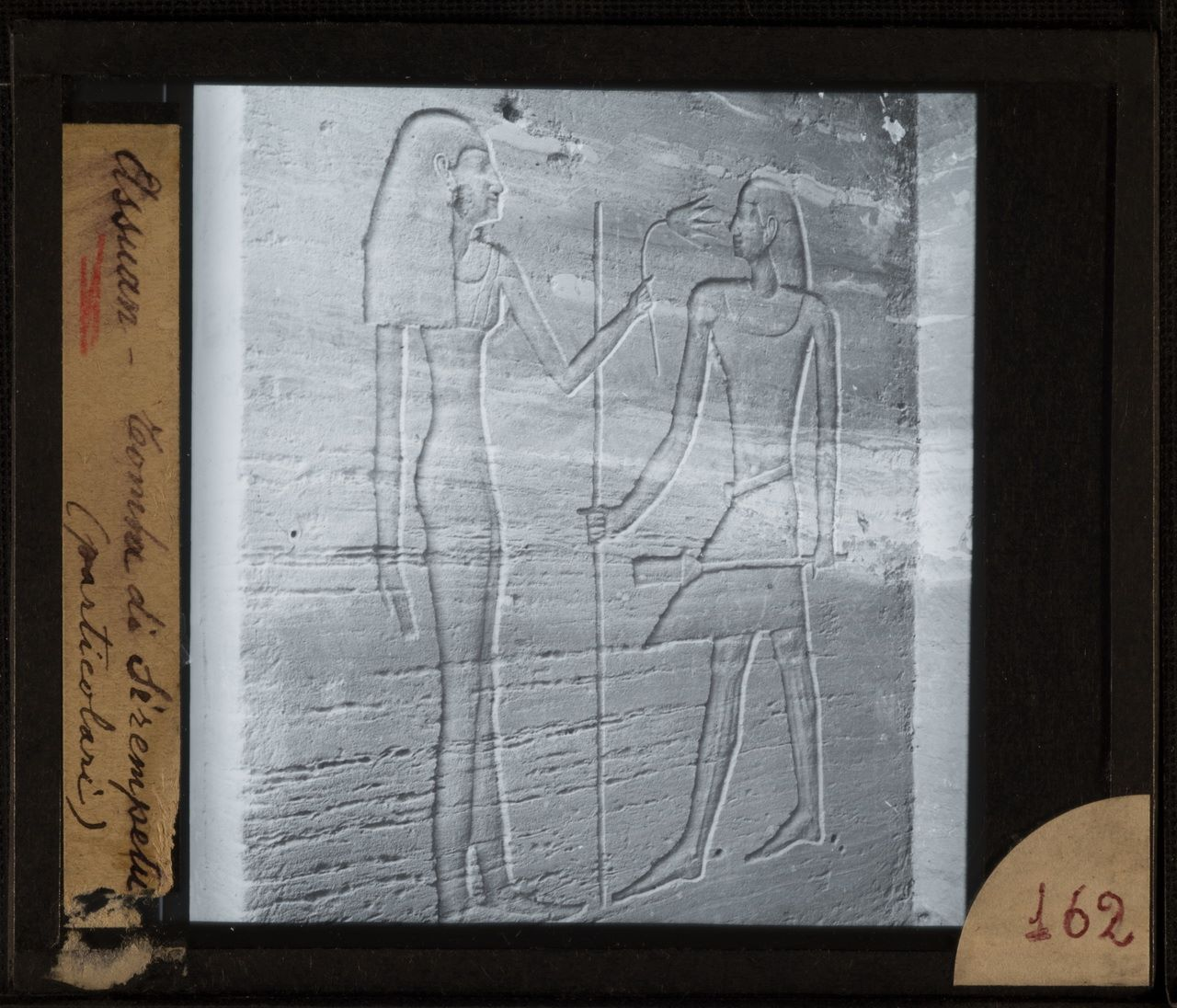
Detail of an interior wall decorated with the representation of the owner, c. 1903-1913 (MAFM 0354).

== See also ==
- Aswan
- Elephantine
- Middle Kingdom of Egypt
- Nomarch
- Qubbet el-Hawa
- Sarenput I
- Sarenput II
- Tomb of Sarenput II
- Twelfth Dynasty of Egypt
