= Luigi Schiaparelli =

Italian historian and palaeographer (1871–1934)

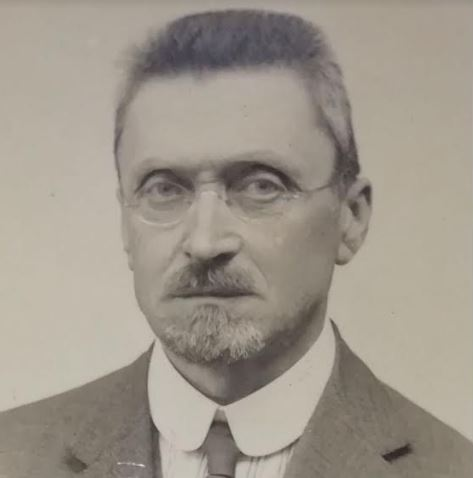
- Schiaparelli in 1927
- Born: 2 August 1871; Cerrione, Piedmont, Kingdom of Italy
- Died: 26 January 1934 (aged 62); Florence, Tuscany, Kingdom of Italy
- Occupations: Historian; palaeographer
- Relatives: Ernesto Schiaparelli (first cousin); Celestino Schiaparelli (first cousin); Giovanni Schiaparelli (first cousin); Elsa Schiaparelli (first cousin once removed); Pasquale Villari (father-in-law); Luigi Villari (brother-in-law)

Academic background
- Education: University of Turin

Academic work
- Main interests: Diplomatics; palaeography; history

Luigi Schiaparelli (2 August 1871 – 26 January 1934) was an Italian historian, palaeographer and diplomat.

== Biography ==
Schiaparelli was born on 2 August 1871, in Cerrione, to pharmacist Giovanni Battista and Celestina Schiaparelli (née Maffei). He was a member of the Schiaparelli academic and scientific family, which included his cousins Ernesto, Giovanni and Celestino, as well as the latter's daughter Elsa. He was also a descendant of Francesco Scipione Maffei through his mother.

Schiaparelli studied at the University of Turin, earning his doctorate in 1894. He later moved to Munich to work on Byzantine literature under Paul Fridolin Kehr. To help prepare the Italia Pontificia, he returned to Italy to collect documents from the Middle Ages. In 1902, Pasquale Villari offered him Cesare Paoli's job as a palaeography and diplomatics the University of Florence. He accepted the offer, moving to Florence and marrying Villari's daughter. In 1924, he discovered the Veronese Riddle. He died on 26 January 1934, aged 62, in Florence.
