= Giulio Farina =

Italian egyptologist (1889-1947)

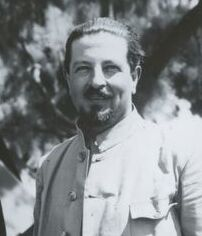
Giulio Farina in 1930-1935

Giulio Farina (Frascati, May 31, 1889 – Trofarello, December 23, 1947) was an Italian egyptologist, archaeologist and sociologist. Farina is considered one of the leading scholars of Italian egyptology of the early twentieth century for his methodical rigor, precision in his research and breadth of knowledge, which earned him the direction and Superintendence of the Egyptian Museum of Turin. He served as the director of the Egyptian Museum of Turin—now called the Museo Egizio—from 1928 to 1946 when his health declined and forced him to retire.

== Biography ==
Giulio Farina began his studies of egyptology as a student of Orazio Marucchi, who was part of the Italian archaeological mission of Ernesto Schiaparelli. Farina accompanied the latter on two archaeological missions: to Thebes (1909) and Oxyrhynchus (1910), only to later argue about his working methods in an article that had a large following.

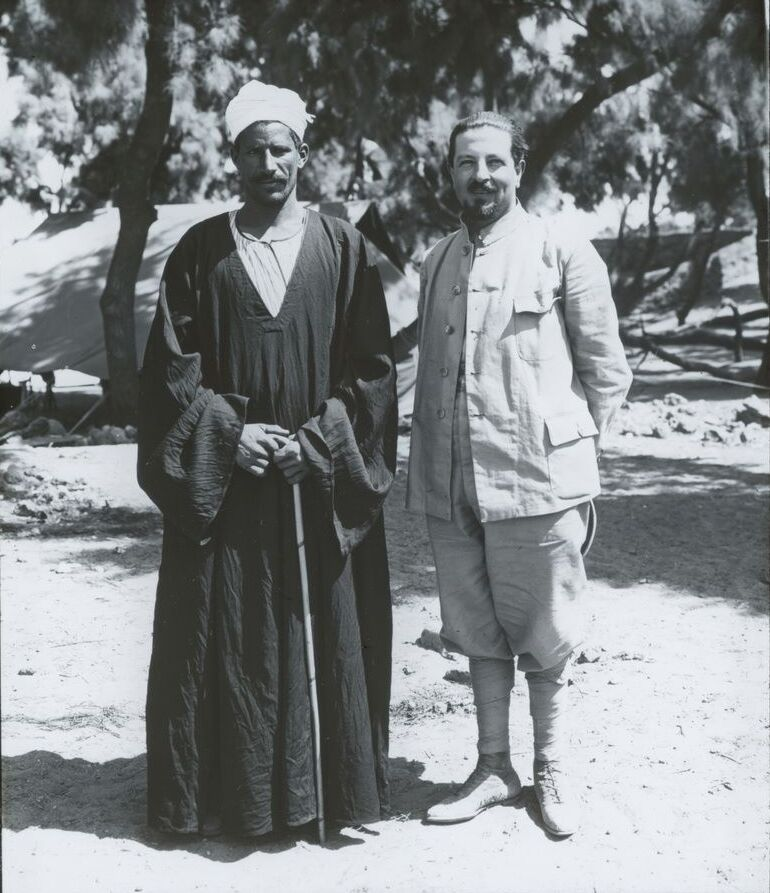
Giulio Farina (right) and the village chief in the camp of the Italian Archaeological Mission in Gebelein, during the Farina Excavations (1930–1935).

Having obtained his doctorate in 1914, he was hired by the Egyptian section of the Archaeological Museum of Florence, where he remained until 1928; thanks to the material it contained, he began his career as a researcher. In 1910, he published a Grammar of the ancient Egyptian language in hieroglyphic characters which, republished in 1926 with a dedication to Adolf Erman and translated into French in 1927, remained for forty years the only reference manual for Italian scholars and students. But the work that made him internationally famous was the monograph The functions of the pharaonic vizier under the XVIII dynasty according to the inscription of the tomb of Rechmirîe in Thebes, published in 1917, in which for the first time the text of the tomb of Rekhmire and the parallels of the tombs of User and Amenemopet were published, translated and critically commented, and which constituted a fundamental investigation into the attributions of the office of vizier in the Egyptian civil administration.

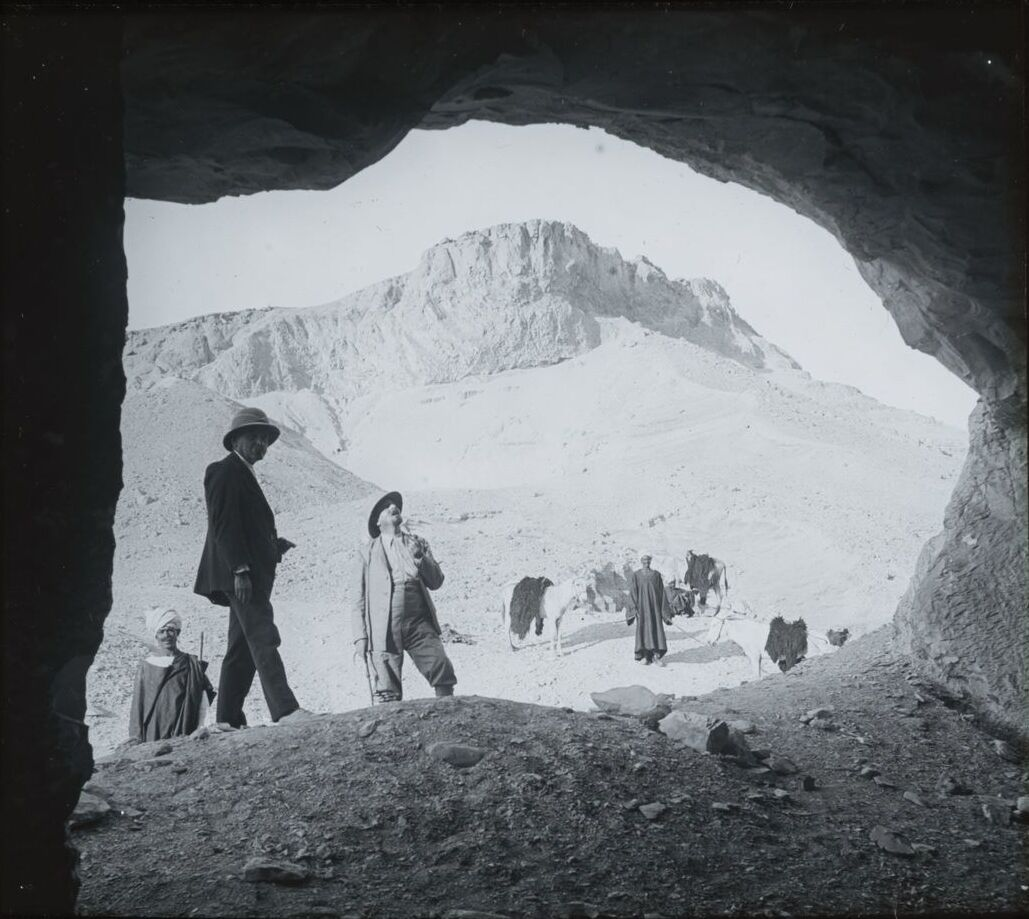
Giulio Farina (center) with Giovanni Marro (left) and some Egyptians during a search at the entrance of a cave near Gebelein, during the Farina Excavations (1930–1935).

Following the discovery of the tomb of Tutankhamun (1922) and the fame deriving from his publications, he was appointed to teach Egyptology at the University of Rome La Sapienza and In 1929, he began to collaborate with the Enciclopedia Italiana, for which he wrote all the entries relating to Egyptology. Upon Schiaparelli's death (1928), he was entrusted with the directorship of the Egyptian Museum of Turin (also known as the Museo Egizio). In a short time, with a media campaign also conducted in the columns of La Stampa newspaper, he managed to convince the Mussolini Government to transfer the museum's headquarters to the most prestigious rooms of the art gallery of the Academy of Sciences. In that role he also led an archaeological expedition to Gebelein, in which he discovered a famous fabric now preserved in the subalpine museum. He returned to Egypt again in 1935 and in 1937 where he discovered some of the oldest papyri known to date from the 4th dynasty of Egypt's Old Kingdom (2543 -2435 BCE). He dedicated one of his most famous works to The Restored Papyrus of the Kings or Turin Canon, in which he proposed a new placement of some fragments, gave the hieroglyphic transcription of the hieratic text, the translation and an extensive historical-chronological commentary.

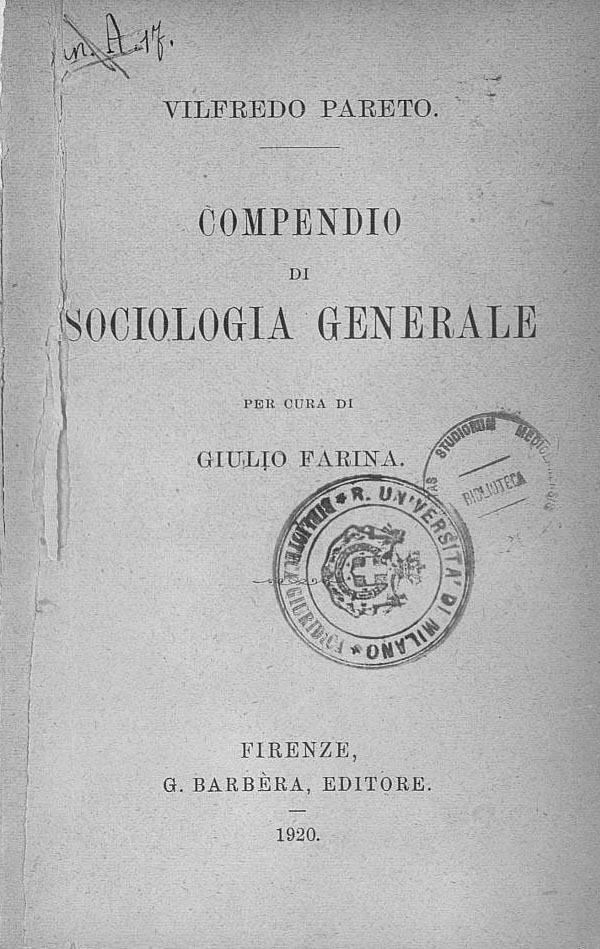
Compendium of general sociology 1920 by Farina (in Italian)

In 1939, he was appointed superintendent of the Egyptian Museum of Turin, and after the first Allied bombing of Turin, on December 2, 1942, he wrote a telegram to the Minister of Public Education, Giuseppe Bottai, to ask him to come and see the situation of the museum. On December 8, 1942 the museum was hit, with numerous damages to the finds, and thanks to him it was possible to evacuate the collections to the Agliè Castle, with the aid of the Wehrmacht. All the finds were then brought back at the end of the war with help of the Allied forces: the Egyptian museum was one of the first to reopen in 1946.

Afflicted by the loss of his wife, the Italian writer Marianna Cavalieri, Farina contracted a serious illness that after 1942 increasingly hindered his work, leading to his death on 23 December 1947. Farina was a member of the Turin Academy of Science.

== Publications ==
- Farina G., Grammar of the Ancient Egyptian Language in Hieroglyphic Characters, Hopeli, Milan 1910
- Farina G., Arabic Grammar for the Literary Language, Messaggerie Italiane, Bologna 1912
- Farina G., The Functions of the Pharaonic Vizier under the XVIII Dynasty According to the Inscription of the Tomb of Rechmirîe in Thebes, Proceedings of the Accademia Nazionale dei Lincei, s. 5, XXV 1916-17
- Pareto V., Farina G. (edited by), Compendium of general sociology, Barbera Editore, Siena 1920
- Cavalieri M., Under the wings of gold (in Egypt 4000 years ago), preface by Giulio Farina, Bemporad & F. Editori, Florence 1926
- Farina G., Egyptian painting, Treves Editore, Milan 1929
- Farina G., The Papyrus of the Kings restored PDF, Egyptological Publications of the Royal Museum of Turin n. 1, Rome 1938

Preceded by Ernesto Schiaparelli	Director of the Museo Egizio; 1928–1946	Succeeded by unknown
