= Berry Berenson =

American actress (1948–2001)

- Berenson in 1971
- Born: Berinthia Berenson; April 14, 1948; New York City, US
- Died: September 11, 2001 (aged 53); New York City, US
- Cause of death: Plane crash as part of the September 11 attacks
- Occupations: Actress; model; photographer
- Years active: 1960s–2001
- Spouse: Anthony Perkins (m. 1973; died 1992)
- Children: Osgood Perkins; Elvis Perkins
- Relatives: Elsa Schiaparelli (grandmother); Marisa Berenson (sister); Celestino Schiaparelli (great-grandfather); Giovanni Schiaparelli (great-granduncle)

Berinthia "Berry" Berenson-Perkins (née Berenson; April 14, 1948 – September 11, 2001) was an American actress, model and photographer. She was the wife of actor Anthony Perkins.

She died in the September 11 attacks, as a passenger on American Airlines Flight 11. It crashed into the North Tower of the World Trade Center in New York City.

== Early life ==
Berinthia Berenson, nicknamed "Berry", was born on April 14, 1948, in Murray Hill, Manhattan, New York City. Her mother was born Maria-Luisa Yvonne Radha de Wendt de Kerlor, better known as Gogo Schiaparelli, a socialite of Italian, Swiss, and French ancestry. Her father, Robert Lawrence Berenson, was an American career diplomat turned shipping executive. He was of Russian-Jewish and Polish-Jewish descent, and his family's original surname was Valvrojenski.

Her elder sister, Marisa Berenson, became a well-known model and actress. Their maternal grandmother was Italian-born fashion designer Elsa Schiaparelli, and her maternal grandfather was Wilhelm de Wendt de Kerlor, a Theosophist and psychic medium. The Berenson sisters were also great-grandnieces of Giovanni Schiaparelli, an Italian astronomer who believed he had discovered canals on Mars, and a second cousin, once removed, of art expert Bernard Berenson (1865–1959), and his sister Senda Berenson (1868–1954), an athlete and educator who was one of the first two women elected to the Basketball Hall of Fame.

== Career ==
Following a brief modeling career in the late 1960s, Berenson became a freelance photographer. In 1972, Berenson's fiancé Richard Bernstein was hired as the cover artist for Andy Warhol's Interview magazine. Berenson would recruit models for the cover and photograph them, and Bernstein illustrated the images. By 1973, her photographs had been published in Life, Glamour, Vogue and Newsweek.

Berenson studied acting at New York's The American Place Theatre with Wynn Handman along with Richard Gere, Philip Anglim, Penelope Milford, Robert Ozn, Ingrid Boulting and her sister Marisa.

As an actress, Berenson starred opposite her husband Anthony Perkins in the 1978 Alan Rudolph film Remember My Name. She also appeared with Jeff Bridges in the 1979 film Winter Kills, and with Malcolm McDowell in Cat People (1982).

== Personal life ==
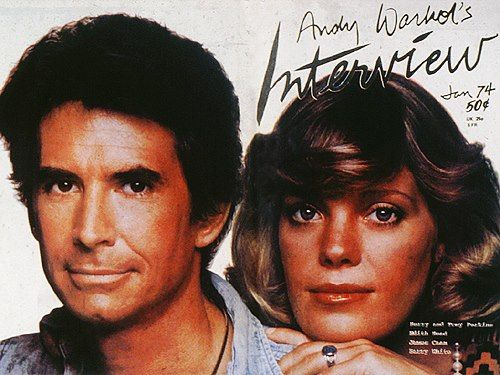
Perkins and Berenson on the January 1974 cover of Andy Warhol's Interview magazine

Berenson was engaged to artist Richard Bernstein. In 1972, Berenson had an affair with actor Anthony Perkins and they married on August 9, 1973, in Wellfleet, Massachusetts, while she was three months pregnant. The couple raised two sons: actor-director Osgood Perkins and folk/rock singer-songwriter Elvis Perkins. They remained married until Perkins died from AIDS-related complications on September 12, 1992.

== Death ==
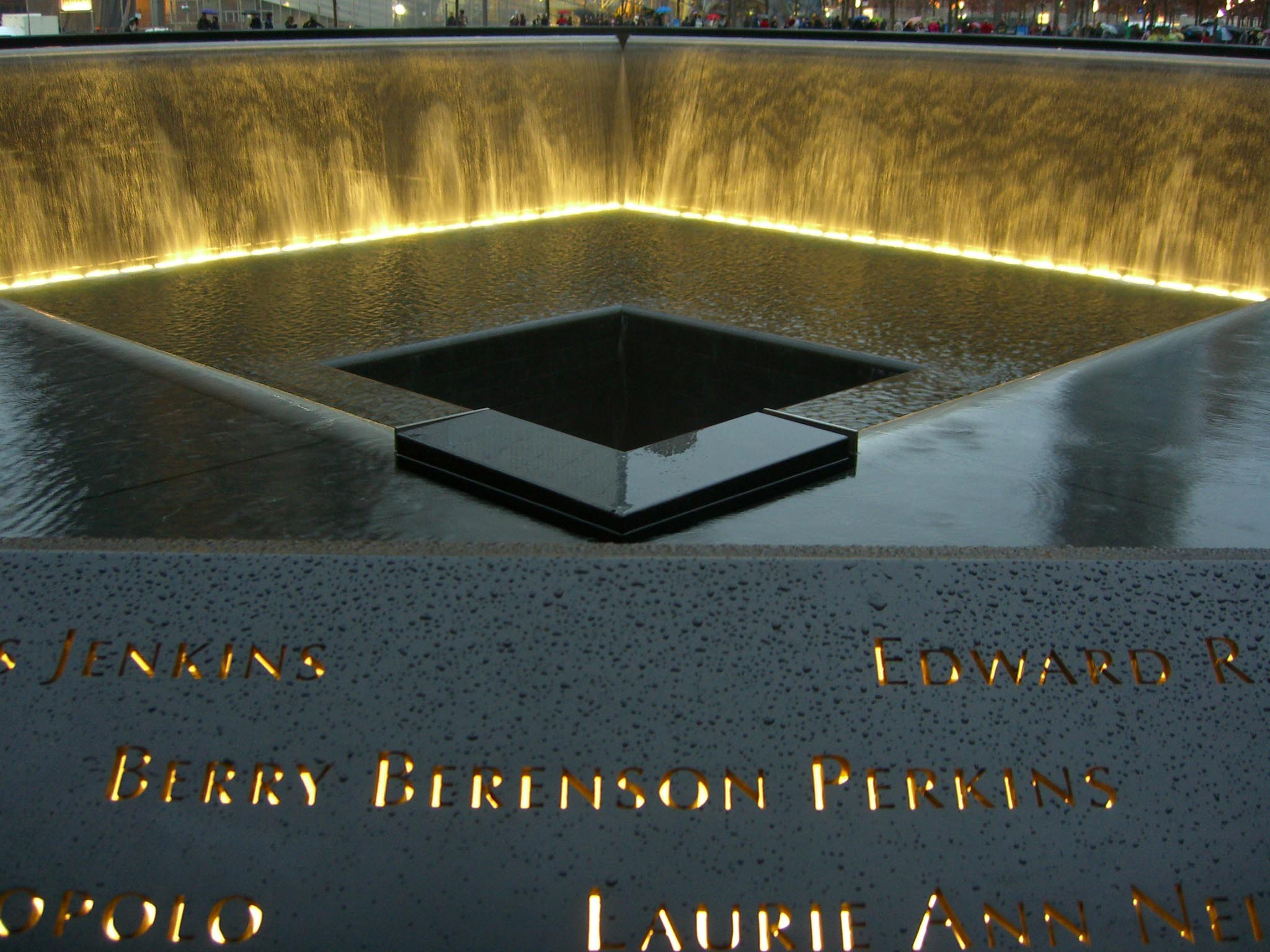
Berenson's name is located on Panel N-76 of the National September 11 Memorial & Museum's North Pool

Berenson died on September 11, 2001, a day before the ninth anniversary of Perkins' death, as she was returning home to Los Angeles from a vacation on Cape Cod. She and the other passengers and crew aboard American Airlines Flight 11 died when the plane was hijacked and deliberately crashed into the North Tower of the World Trade Center during the September 11 attacks. Her remains were never found.

At the National September 11 Memorial & Museum, Berenson's name is inscribed on Panel N-76 at the North Pool.
