= Marisa Berenson =

American actress and model

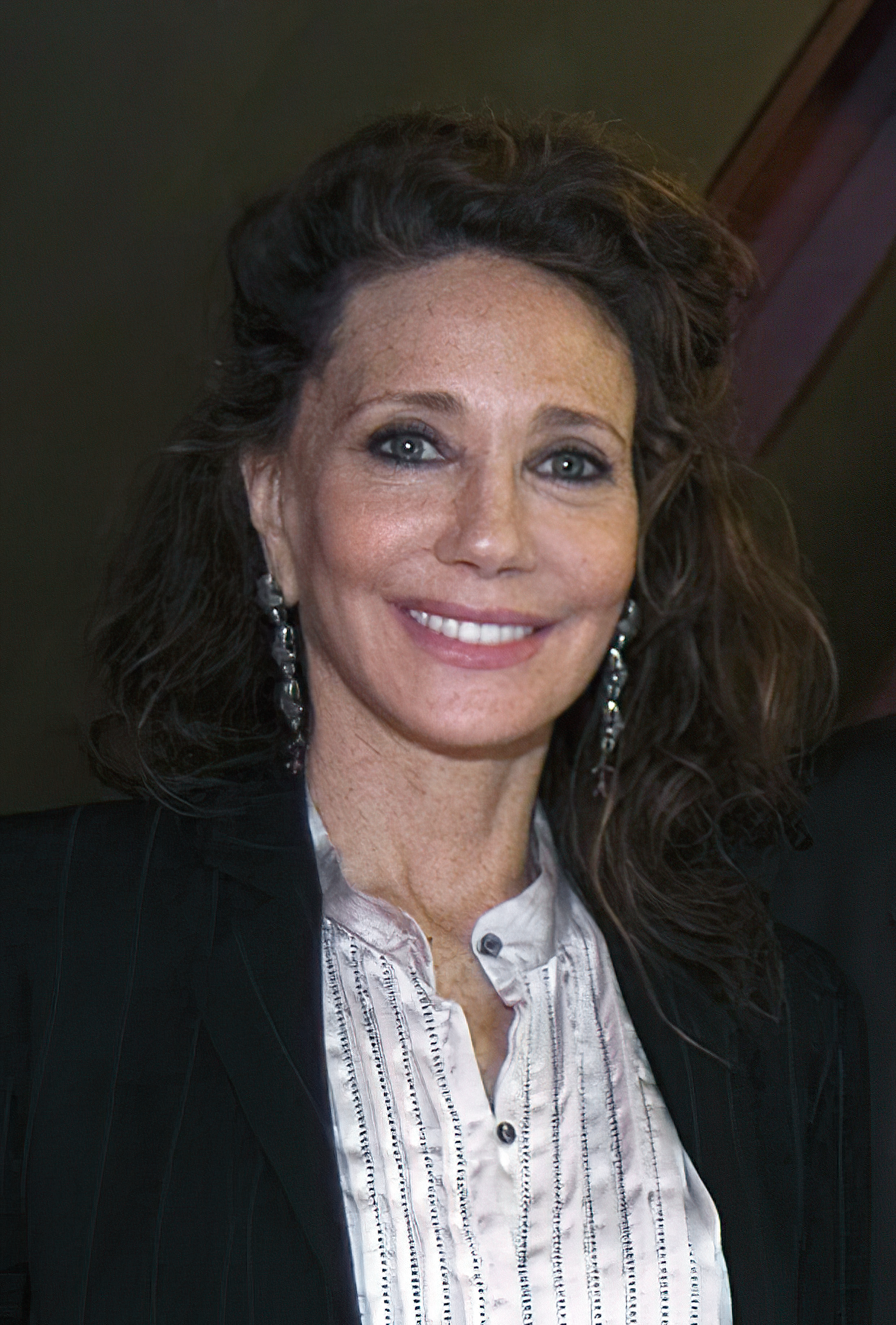
- Berenson in 2013
- Born: Vittoria Marisa Schiaparelli Berenson; New York City, U.S.
- Occupations: Actress, model
- Years active: 1965–present
- Spouses: James Randall (m. 1976; div. 1978) Aaron Richard Golub (m. 1982; div. 1987)
- Children: Starlite Melody Randall
- Relatives: Elsa Schiaparelli (grandmother); Berry Berenson (sister); Celestino Schiaparelli (great-grandfather); Giovanni Schiaparelli (great-granduncle); Anthony Perkins (brother-in-law); Osgood Perkins (nephew); Elvis Perkins (nephew)

Vittoria Marisa Schiaparelli Berenson is an American model and actress. A granddaughter of designer Elsa Schiaparelli, she rose to international prominence in the late 1960s and 1970s. Berenson was a model, appearing on the covers of Vogue and Harper's Bazaar. Known as the "Queen of the Scene," she became a style icon known for her eclectic and bohemian-chic aesthetic.

Berenson transitioned to film with notable roles including Death in Venice (1971) and achieved critical acclaim as Natalia Landauer in Cabaret (1972), for which she won the National Board of Review Award for Best Supporting Actress and received Golden Globe and BAFTA nominations. Her other film appearances include Barry Lyndon (1975), S.O.B. (1981), and I Am Love (2009). In 2001, she made her Broadway debut in the revival of Design for Living.

== Early life ==
=== Childhood ===
Berenson was born in New York City, the elder of two daughters. Her father, Robert Lawrence Berenson, was an American career diplomat turned shipping executive. He was of Russian Jewish and Polish Jewish descent; the family's original paternal surname was Valvrojenski. Her mother was Maria-Luisa Yvonne "Gogo" Radha de Wendt Schiaparelli, a socialite of Italian, Swiss and French descent.

=== Family ===
Berenson's maternal grandmother was the fashion designer Elsa Schiaparelli, and her maternal grandfather was Wilhelm de Wendt de Kerlor, a theosophist and psychic medium.

Her younger sister, Berinthia, became a model, actress, and photographer, and was known as Berry Berenson. She was married to actor Anthony Perkins. Berry Berenson died on September 11, 2001 in New York City, as a passenger on American Airlines Flight 11.

Berenson and her sister are also great-grandnieces of Giovanni Schiaparelli, an Italian astronomer who was the first to describe the canals of Mars. They are second cousins, once removed, of art expert Bernard Berenson and his sister Senda Berenson, an athlete and educator who was one of the first two women elected to the Basketball Hall of Fame.

== Career ==
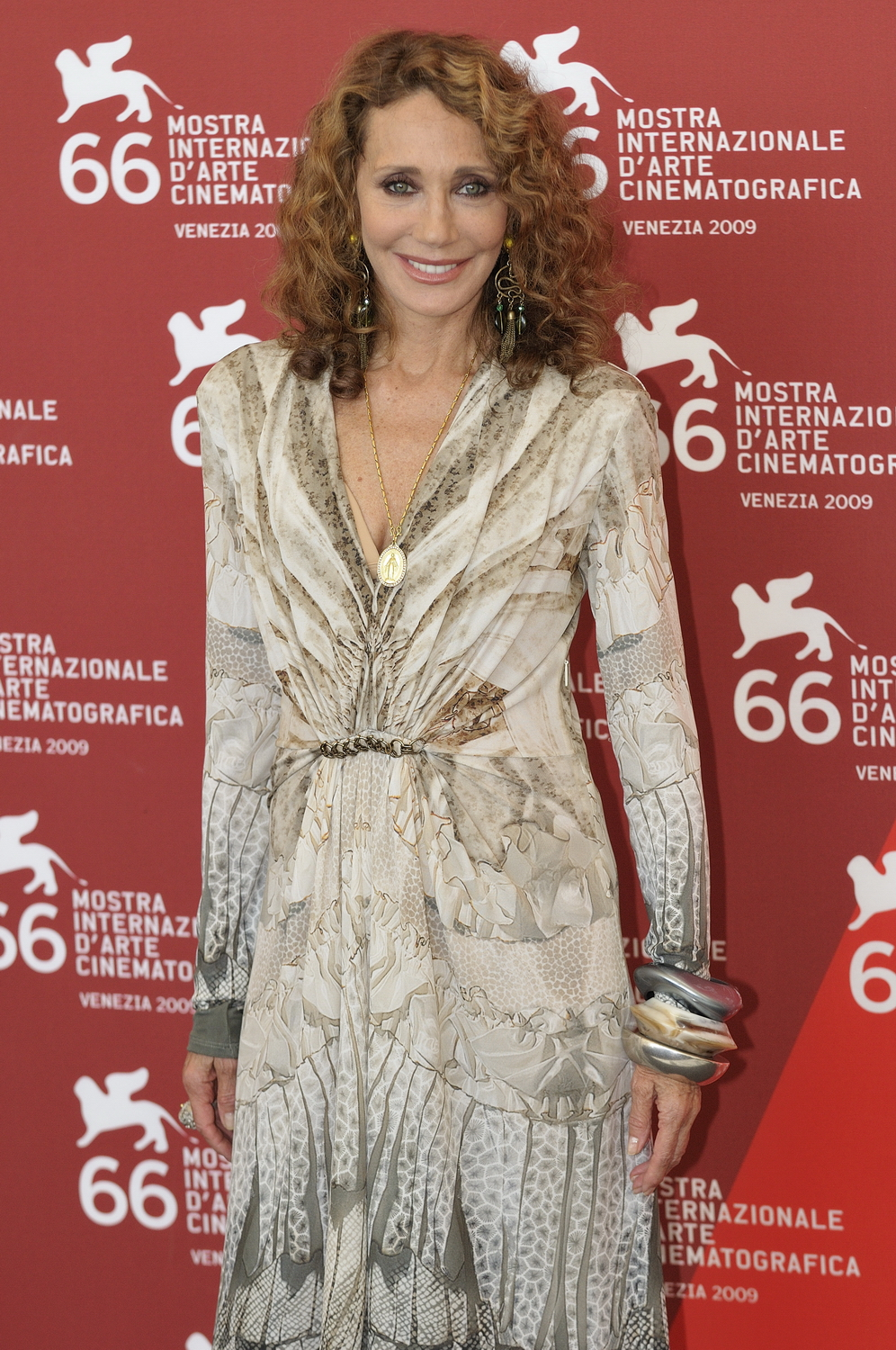
Berenson at the 2009 Venice Film Festival

Discovered as a teenager by Vogue editor Diana Vreeland, Berenson rose to prominence in the 1960s. She made her debut on the cover of Vogue at age 18 in 1965 and went on to appear in numerous covers and fashion editorials throughout the late 1960s and early 1970s. Frequently seen at nightclubs and social gatherings, she became known as "the Queen of the Scene," while designer Yves Saint Laurent famously dubbed her "the girl of the Seventies."

Berenson's early film roles included Gustav von Aschenbach's wife in Luchino Visconti's 1971 film Death in Venice and the Jewish department store heiress Natalia Landauer in the 1972 film Cabaret. The latter role led to two Golden Globe nominations, a BAFTA nomination, and an award from the National Board of Review.

Berenson appeared on the cover of the December 15, 1975 issue of Time magazine. She portrayed the tragic beauty Lady Lyndon in the Stanley Kubrick film Barry Lyndon (1975). Vincent Canby of The New York Times wrote: "Marisa Berenson splendidly suits her costumes and wigs." She recalled her experience working under Kubrick's direction: I liked him very much. He had a lot of dry humour. Contrary to what people think — they have this image of Stanley as this difficult ogre — he wasn't at all. He was a perfectionist, but every great director I've worked with has been a perfectionist. You have to be to make extraordinary films.

Berenson's other performances included Casanova & Co. (1977), Killer Fish (1979), the Blake Edwards comedy S.O.B. (1981), The Secret Diary of Sigmund Freud (1984), and Clint Eastwood's White Hunter Black Heart (1990), as well as in made-for-TV movies in the United States, such as the Holocaust-themed drama Playing for Time (1980). She guest-starred in an episode of The Muppet Show during its third season in 1978. She made her Broadway debut in the 2001 revival of Design for Living, which also starred Jennifer Ehle, Alan Cumming, and Dominic West. In 2009, she appeared in the film I Am Love.

In August 2016, she appeared in a production of Romeo and Juliet at the Garrick Theatre in London, as Lady Capulet.

Berenson is chairman of the board of Culture Project, an organization that sponsors the theater.

== Personal life ==
On September 11, 2001, her younger sister and sole sibling, Berry Perkins, widow of actor Anthony Perkins, was killed in the first flight to hit the World Trade Center. Marisa was also in an airplane during the terrorist attacks, flying from Paris to New York. In an interview with CBS, she told of the experience and how hours later she landed in Newfoundland (flights were diverted to Canada), and was told of her sister's death by a phone call with her daughter. Said Berenson: "I have hope and tremendous faith. I think that's what gets you through life ... through tragedies is when you have faith."

Of her practice of Transcendental Meditation she said:

India changed my life, because I was searching for my spiritual path, and I ended up in an ashram in Rishikesh with Maharishi and the Beatles. We'd sit on the floor at night, and George and Ringo would play the guitar, and we'd meditate all day, and have meals together, and become vegetarians, and live in huts. But it was just normal. It wasn't like, "Oh, here are the Beatles." The most important thing was my transcendental meditation.

In the 1970s, Berenson was a vegetarian and believer in reincarnation. She later abandoned vegetarianism and returned to eating meat.

Berenson lives in a villa on the outskirts of Marrakesh. She is fluent in English, Italian, and French.

=== Relationships ===
Berenson became engaged to French banking heir David René de Rothschild in 1972; the couple separated the following year. Reportedly, his family disapproved of their relationship because of Berenson's nude modeling photographs and revealing style of dress. Reflecting on the reaction, she later said, "I was very free," recalling how her transparent gowns shocked his family.

Her first husband was James Randall, a rivet manufacturer. They had an extravagant wedding at Randall's Beverly Hills home in November 1976. Berenson's sister was the maid of honor, and George Hamilton was the best man. Guests included Andy Warhol, Halston, Valentino, and Giorgio di Sant'Angelo. In 1977, the couple had one daughter, who is a social worker, before they divorced in 1978.

Her second husband was Aaron Richard Golub (born 1942, Worcester, Massachusetts), a lawyer, whom she married in 1982 and divorced in 1987. During the divorce proceedings, the judge ruled "the increased value of Ms. Berenson's acting and modeling career during the marriage were marital property" and therefore subject to consideration in any settlement agreements.

== Filmography ==
=== Film ===
Year	Title	Role	Notes
1971	Death in Venice	Frau von Aschenbach	
1972	Cabaret	Natalia Landauer	NBR Award for Best Supporting Actress; Nominated – Golden Globe for Best Supporting Actress - Motion Picture; Nominated – Golden Globe for Most Promising Newcomer - Female; Nominated – BAFTA Film Award for Best Supporting Actress
1973	Un modo di essere donna	Sibilla Ferrandi	
1975	Barry Lyndon	Lady Honoria Lyndon	
1977	Some Like It Cool	The Caliph's Wife	
1979	Killer Fish	Ann	
1981	S.O.B.	Mavis	
1984	Led by the Nose	Vera	
1984	The Syringe	L'Arbalète'	
1984	The Secret Diary of Sigmund Freud	Emma Herrmann	
1986	Flagrant désir	Jeanne Barnac	
1987	Via Montenapoleone	Francesca	
1990	White Hunter Black Heart	Kay Gibson	
1990	Night of the Cyclone	Françoise	
1992	Il giardino dei ciliegi	Charlotte	
1994	Venti dal Sud	Anne de Bois	
1995	Le grand blanc de Lambaréné	Helene Schweitzer	
1997	Tonka	Mme Pflaum	
1997	Elles	Chloé	
1998	Riches, belles, etc.	Alizéa	
1999	Retour à la vie	Stéphanie	
2000	The Photographer	Julie Morris	
2000	Primetime Murder	Martha Werther	
2001	Lisa	Princess Maruschka	
2001	Lonesome	Verena	
2004	People	Daniella	
2004	Le plus beau jour de ma vie	Barbara	
2005	Colour Me Kubrick	Alex Witchell	
2007	24 Bars	La mère	
2007	Jalouse	Belinda Jones-Rostand (Marie-José Jalou)	Short film
2008	Vote and Die: Liszt for President	Dr. Elizabeth Dyson	
2009	I Am Love	Allegra Rori Recchi	
2009	Cinéman	Lady Lyndon	
2010	The Disciple	Maria	
2010	Weddings and Other Disasters	Lucrezia	
2010	Hitler in Hollywood	Herself	
2011	Gigola	Solange	
2013	Opium	Marquise Casati	
2013	The Love Punch	Clothilde	
2016	Branagh Theatre Live: Romeo and Juliet	Lady Capulet	
2019	Halston	Herself	
2023	DogMan	Aristocrat Woman	
2024	My darling family	The singer	
2025	Melpomene	Martha’s grandmother	

=== Television ===
Year	Title	Role	Notes
1967	Coronet Blue	Mary Barclay	Episode: "Faces"
1978	The Muppet Show	Herself	Episode: Marisa Berenson
1980	Tourist	Marian	TV movie
1980	Playing for Time	Elzvieta	TV movie
1983	Bel ami	Clotilde de Marelle	Limited series
1985	The Equalizer	Andrea Browne	Episode: "Back Home"
1986	Sins	Luba Tcherina	Recurring role (3 episodes)
1986	Who's The Boss?	Genevieve Pescher	Episode: "Not with My Client You Don't"
1986	ABC Afterschool Specials	Liz Childs	Episode: "Getting Even: A Wimp's Revenge"
1987	Lo scialo	Nina	Recurring role (3 episodes)
1988	Hemingway	Pauline Pfeiffer	Main role (4 episodes)
1989	Spy Wars	Isabella De Ambrosis	Main role (3 episodes)
1989	Ocean	Muneca Chavez	Main role (6 episodes)
1990	Have A Nice Night	Barbara Jenkins	TV movie
1990	Blaues Blut	Ann Ryder	Episode: "Schatten der Vergangenheit"
1990	Chillers	Professor Rebecca Vernay	Episode: "The Thrill Seeker"
1991	L'enfant des loups	Radegonde	TV movie
1991	Hollywood Detective	Dorothy Parker	Episode: "Romanoff a Clef"
1991	Ti ho adottato per simpatia	Unknown	TV movie
1992	Murder, She Wrote	Claudia Cameron	Episode: "Danse Diabolique"
1992	Notorious	Katarina Sebastian	TV movie
1995	Maigret	Mme Crosby	Episode: "Maigret et la tête d'un homme"
1995	Het verdriet van België	Madame Laura	Recurring role (2 episodes)
1998	Maintenant et pour toujours	Marianne	TV movie
2001	Ama il tuo nemico 2	Unknown	TV movie
2004	Commissaire Valence	Mme Irène	Episode: "Machination"
2004	Julie, chevalier de Maupin	Madame de Maintenon	TV movie
2005	Venus and Apollo	Albina de Braise	Episode: "Soin défraîchi"
2005	Le juge est une femme	Julie de Berg	Episode: "La petite marchande de fleurs"
2006–2007	Mafiosa	Caterina Paoli	Recurring role (6 episodes)
2007	Lost Signs	Irène de Lestrade	Recurring role (12 episodes)
2010	Il peccato e la vergogna	Elena Fontamara	Recurring role (2 episodes)
2010	Caldo criminale	Lucrezia	TV movie
2011	Le sang de la vigne	Shirley	Episode: "Le dernier coup de Jarnac"
2014	La collection: Ecrire pour... la trentaine vue par des écrivains	Marianne	Episode: "Rose Mystica"
2018	Velvet Colección	Sandra Petribello	Recurring role (2 episodes)

== Theatre ==
Year	Title	Role	Venue	Ref.
1980	Holiday	Julia Seton	Ahmanson Theatre, Los Angeles	
2001	Design For Living	Grace Torrence	Broadway, Roundabout Revival	
2016	Romeo and Juliet	Lady Capulet	West End, Kenneth Branagh Revival	
2018-2019	Berlin Kabarett	Kirsten	Théâtre de Poche-Montparnasse, Paris	
