= Ernesto Schiaparelli =

Italian Egyptologist (1856–1928)

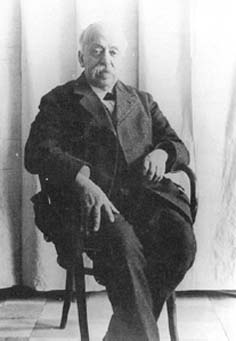
- Ernesto Schiaparelli
- Born: 12 July 1856; Occhieppo Inferiore, Kingdom of Sardinia
- Died: 14 February 1928 (aged 71); Turin, Kingdom of Italy
- Known for: Discovery of the tomb of Nefertari (QV66); Discovery of TT8
- Relatives: Celestino Schiaparelli (first cousin); Giovanni Schiaparelli (first cousin); Luigi Schiaparelli (first cousin); Elsa Schiaparelli (first cousin once removed)
- Scientific career
- Fields: Egyptology

Ernesto Schiaparelli (Italian pronunciation: [erˈnɛsto skjapaˈrɛlli]; 12 July 1856 – 14 February 1928) was an Italian Egyptologist.

== Biography ==
Schiaparelli was born on 12 July 1856 near Biella. He found Queen Nefertari's tomb in Deir el-Medina in the Valley of the Queens (1904) and excavated the TT8 tomb of the royal architect Kha (1906), found intact and displayed in toto in Turin. He was appointed director of the Egyptian Museum in Florence, where he professionally reorganized the collection in new quarters in 1880, then at the peak of his career was made director of the Museo Egizio in Turin, which became with him and his many seasons of excavating, the second biggest Egyptian museum in the world. He was the author of famous scholarly works and a Senator of the Kingdom of Italy. At the same time, he was deeply involved, from his first stay with Franciscan missionaries at Luxor in 1884, with relieving the poverty he saw among the missionaries of Upper Egypt, for whom he founded the Association to Succour Italian Missionaries (ANSMI), which expanded its work to care for Italian emigrants throughout the Near East. Schiaparelli was from a distinguished family of scholars. His father Luigi Schiaparelli taught history at the University of Turin. Among his kin were his cousins Giovanni Virginio Schiaparelli, an astronomer, and Celestino, an Arabist; his uncle Giovanni Battista, a pioneer of industrial chemistry; the latter's son Luigi, a paleographer; and Celestino's daughter Elsa Schiaparelli, one of the most prominent figures in fashion between the two World Wars; other relatives were Cesare, a pioneer of photography, and Carlo Felice, an agronomist.

In 1902, permission to excavate the Western cemetery in Giza was granted by Gaston Maspero, director of the Egyptian Antiquities Service. The area was divided into three sections, and chosen by lot. The southern section was given to the Italians under Ernesto Schiaparelli, the northern strip to the Germans under Ludwig Borchardt, and the middle section to Andrew Reisner.

From 1903 to 1906, he explored more than eighty tombs, already looted, in the Valley of the Queens, where he discovered the splendid tomb of Queen Nefertari, the great royal wife of Ramses II; and he also discovered the tombs of Jaemuas, Amonherjepershef and Sethherjepershef, sons of Ramses III, and that of Ahmose, princess of the 17th Dynasty.

Between 1903 and 1920, Schiaparelli undertook twelve archaeological campaigns, opening sites in Heliopolis, the cemeteries of Giza, Hermopolis, Assiut, Qaw el-Kebir, Gebelein and Aswan (the tomb of Harkhuf).

== Main publications ==
- Del sentimento religioso degli Egiziani (1877)
- Il Libro del Funerali degli antichi Egiziani, 3 vols. (1881-1890) On the Egyptian Book of the Dead.
- Les Hypogées de Thebes (1889)
- La Tomba Intatta Dell'architetto Kha Nella Necropoli Di Tebe [The Intact Tomb of the Architect Kha in the Necropolis of Thebes] (1927)

Preceded by Ariodante Fabretti	Director of the Museo Egizio; 1894–1928	Succeeded by Giulio Farina
