= Ariodante Fabretti =

Historian and politician from Italy (1816–1894)

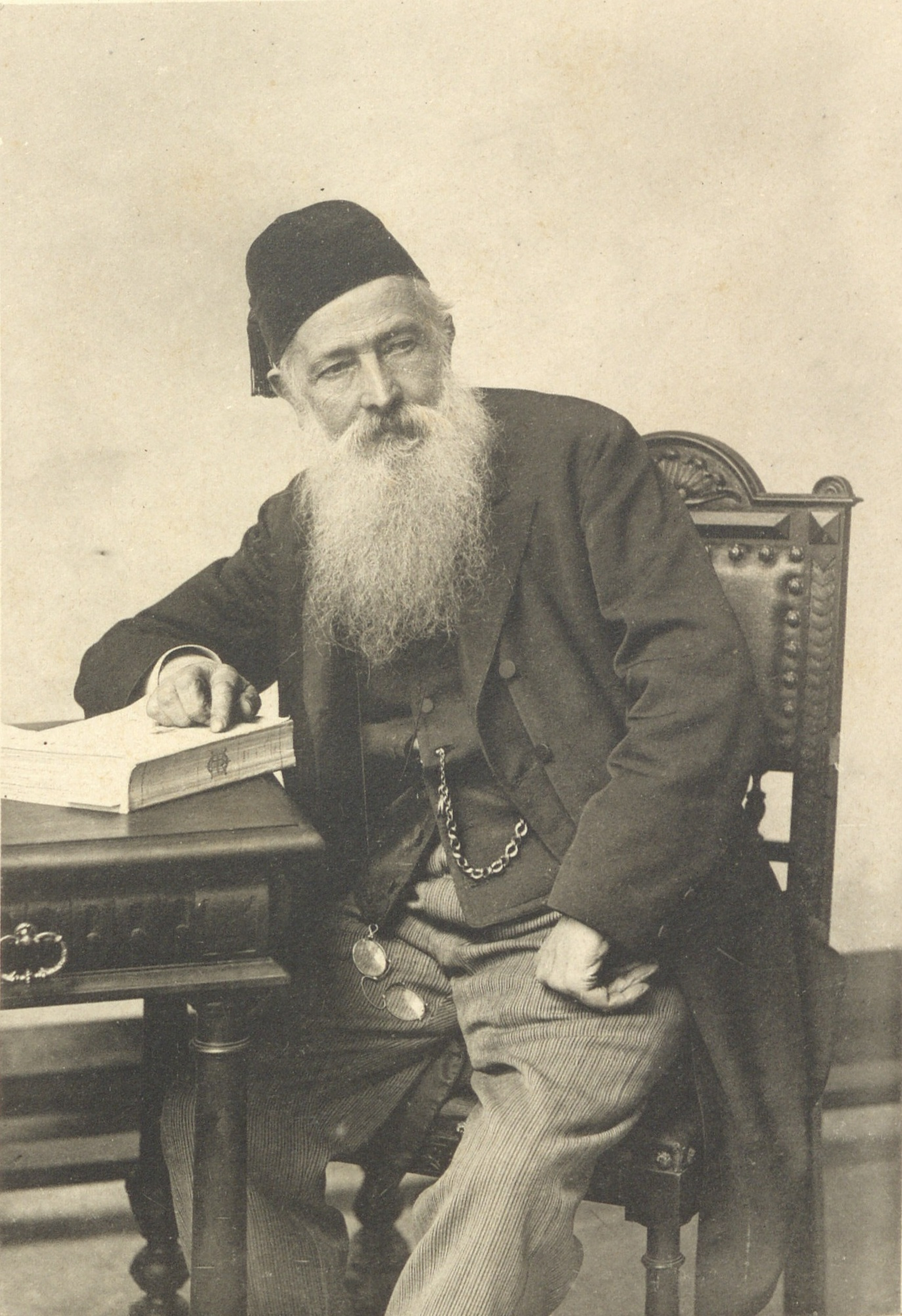
- Born: 1 October 1816; Perugia
- Died: 15 September 1894 (aged 77); Monteu da Po
- Occupation(s): Anthropologist; Archaeologist

Ariodante Fabretti (1 October 1816 – 15 September 1894) was an Italian archaeologist.

== Biography ==
He developed an interest in archaeology through the study of the Etruscan civilization, benefiting from the invaluable guidance of Giovan Battista Vermiglioli. He also cultivated a passion for ancient languages, particularly Greek and Latin, under the influence of the Hellenist Antonio Mezzanotte.

Published Biographies of the Venture Captains of Umbria in 1846, joined the semi-clandestine movements of the Carbonari and Giuseppe Mazzini Italia.

He also enrolled in Medicine University of Bologna, where he earned a degree in veterinary medicine.

Finding himself in the Roma at the time of the Roman Republic (1849–1850), he was also elected to the constituent assembly, unless he later had to emigrate first to Florence and then to Turin to escape papal repression.

Between 1846 and 1849 he taught archaeology at the University of Perugia and in the same city directed the Musei Civici (whose collections are now preserved in the Museo archeologico nazionale dell'Umbria).

In 1860 he obtained an appointment as professor of archaeology at the University of Turin.

In 1840 he was initiated into Freemasonry in the "La Fermezza" Masonic lodge. He was elected to the Junta of the Grand Orient of Italy on June 21, 1867, and in 1873–1874 was a member of the "Dante Alighieri" Lodge of Turin, of which in 1882–1883 he was elected Grand Master (Freemasonry). In 1875 he was appointed a member of the Supreme Council of the Ancient and Accepted Scottish Rite and in 1881 he was among the founders of the "Francesco Guardabassi" Lodge of Perugia.

From 1871 to 1893 he was director of the Museo Egizio, working with Egyptologist Francesco Rossi.

In 1860 he became a National Member of the Turin Academy of Sciences and in 1876 a Member Emeritus of the Accademia dei Lincei.

Advocating the need for postmortem cremation practice, he founded the Cremation Society in 1883, holding the presidency until 1894. Meanwhile, he was also appointed senator of the Kingdom of Italy in 1889, remaining in office until his death. He died at his home in Monteu da Po following, probably, a stroke. According to his precise testamentary wishes he was cremated and the ashes brought back, with worthy honors, to Perugia, while his book and manuscript holdings were donated to the Biblioteca Augusta of the City of Perugia.

| Preceded by Pier Camillo Orcurti | Director of the Museo Egizio; 1872–1893 | Succeeded by Ernesto Schiaparelli |
