= Celestino Schiaparelli =

Italian Arabist and philologist (1841–1919)

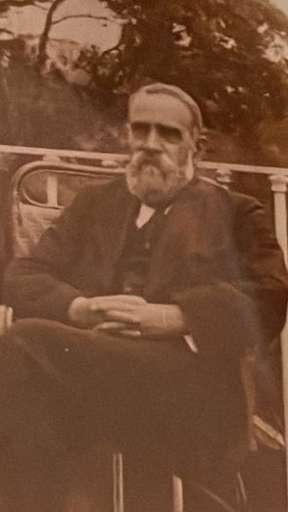
Undated photograph of Schiaparelli

Celestino Schiaparelli (14 May 1841 – 26 October 1919) was an Italian Arabist and philologist and a leading representative of Italian Arabic studies in the late nineteenth and early twentieth centuries. Born in Savigliano, Piedmont, he belonged to the scholarly circle formed around Michele Amari and is regarded as one of Amari's most eminent pupils and successors. He taught Arabic in Florence and, from 1875, at the University of Rome, where he became known for his editions and translations of Arabic texts relating to Italy and Sicily.

== Biography ==
Schiaparelli was born on 14 May 1841 in Savigliano, present-day Piedmont, then part of the Kingdom of Sardinia. He completed his secondary schooling in Savigliano, but his family's financial difficulties prevented him from pursuing university study and compelled him to seek employment. In 1861 he entered the postal administration, first serving in Urbino and then, after a transfer, in Turin and later Florence. Despite the constraints of this career, he continued his studies privately, encouraged in part by the example of his elder brother Giovanni Schiaparelli and his uncle Luigi Schiaparelli.

In Turin, he attended Luigi Calligaris's Arabic course as an auditor in 1864–65. After his transfer to Florence at the end of 1865, he began attending the lectures of Michele Amari at the Istituto Superiore. Amari quickly perceived the unusual promise of the young postal official and drew him into a more rigorous philological apprenticeship. By the beginning of 1868 he had already entrusted Schiaparelli with the editorial work that would become the Vocabulista in arabico, published in Florence in 1871.

The Vocabulista in arabico established Schiaparelli's scholarly reputation. Carlo Alfonso Nallino remarked that the work required competence in Arabic, a command of medieval Latin paleography, and a disciplined method of textual criticism. Schiaparelli even copied out by hand Pedro de Alcalá's Vocabulista aravigo en letra castellana (1505) to assist his work. The work received marked praise in Italy and abroad, and Nallino records that Reinhart Dozy later drew important material from it for his own Supplément aux dictionnaires arabes.

=== University teaching ===
His transition from postal service to university life came through Amari's intervention. After Amari settled in Rome at the end of 1872, Schiaparelli began lecturing there from 1 January 1873 as his substitute. On 1 November 1874 he was appointed extraordinary professor of Arabic language and literature. In 1875, again at Amari's initiative, he received a subsidy from the Minister of Public Instruction, Ruggero Bonghi, to travel to Paris, Cambridge, and Oxford in order to copy manuscript materials for the part of Muhammad al-Idrisi's geography dealing with Italy. On his return he was called to the University of Rome, effective 16 October 1875. Because of the regulations then governing non-compulsory subjects, he did not attain the rank of professore ordinario until 1890. He remained attached to Institute of Oriental Studies until the retirement imposed by age regulations in 1916.

=== Major works in Rome ===
The major publications of Schiaparelli's Roman period were chiefly concerned with Arabic texts relevant to the historical geography and literary culture of Italy, particularly Sicily. The first of these was the edition, translation, and annotation of the section on Italy in al-Idrisi's Kitab Rujar (Book of Roger), published in 1883. Although the work appeared in collaboration with Amari, Nallino states explicitly that nearly all of it, including the substantial preface, was Schiaparelli's own work. This was followed by the publication of al-‘Umari's notices on Italy in 1888, by other studies of smaller scale, and by the first modern edition of the Diwan by the Sicilian Arab poet Ibn Hamdis in 1897. Nallino treats the Ibn Hamdis edition as a major scholarly achievement, observing that scarcely any post-classical Arabic poet had received in Europe an edition of comparable quality. The edition relied principally on the two extant manuscripts then available to him, one preserved in the Vatican and the other in St Petersburg, and incorporated fragments and materials collated from other sources. A third large work was his Italian translation of Ibn Jubayr's travel account, published in 1906, which was widely noticed even beyond the circle of specialists and was useful to De Goeje in preparing a new edition of the Arabic text.

=== Service at the Royal Academy of the Lincei ===
Alongside his teaching and publications, Schiaparelli devoted a considerable portion of his career to institutional service. From 1884 to 1902 he was associated with the library of the Royal Academy of the Lincei, and was its first librarian. According to Nallino, the library lacked adequate staffing, and Schiaparelli therefore undertook much of the work almost single-handedly, reorganizing the collections, cataloguing and indexing volumes in his own hand. He was succeeded by Giuseppe Gabrieli in 1903.

=== Unpublished scholarship ===
Contemporaries and later scholars alike stressed his exceptionally reserved and modest character. His modesty is attributed as one reason why part of his scholarly legacy remained in manuscript in the Institute of Oriental Studies at the University of Rome. Nallino states that Amari's authority had to persuade him to publish the Vocabulista, Idrisi, and al-‘Umari; that the edition of Ibn Hamdis was brought out in fulfilment of a promise to his master; and that the translation of Ibn Jubayr reached the press only through the insistence of friends and colleagues. As a result, a substantial body of work remained unpublished at his death. Among the manuscripts that were essentially ready for publication are Arabic texts and Italian translations relating to Egyptian administrative treatises, an arithmetic of Ibn al-Ha’im, the Italian translation of Ibn Hamdis, the Arabic text and Italian translation of the short Sicilian-Arabic Diwan of al-Balnubi, and further Idrisi materials on Italy.

== Death and legacy ==
Schiaparelli died in Rome on 26 October 1919. His library was donated to the Institute of Oriental Studies at the University of Rome. His work played an important role in connecting Arabic lexicography, geography, and poetry with the medieval history of Italy. He is remembered as one of the leading Italian Arabists of his generation, and as one of the scholars of the Italian Orientalist tradition who continued Michele Amari's foundational work, especially in the development of the small field of Sicilian Islamic studies.

By his wife Maria Luisa de Dominicis, a noblewoman, Schiaparelli had two daughters, Beatrice and Elsa, an Italian fashion designer. Through Elsa, he was the great-grandfather of Marisa Berenson and Berry Berenson.
