= Tombs of the Nobles =

Tombs of the Nobles are a collective term applied to tombs of workers, foremen, priests, soldiers, officials, viziers, princes etc. usually located in the area of a major ancient site in Egypt.

- Tombs of the Nobles (Luxor) — a number of tomb-areas on the West Bank at modern Luxor (Ancient Thebes) is known collectively as the Tombs of the Nobles.
- Tombs of the Nobles (Saqqara) — a large number of royal and nonroyal tombs from the 1st and 2nd dynasty, Old Kingdom and New Kingdom.
- Tombs of the Nobles (Amarna) — The collective name for the South Tombs and North Tombs.
- Qubbet el-Hawa (Aswan) — a series of rock cut tombs, known sometimes as the Tombs of the Nobles.
