= Autobiography of Harkhuf =

Tomb inscription from ancient Egypt

Harkhuf
- Nomarch of the 1st nome of Upper Egypt
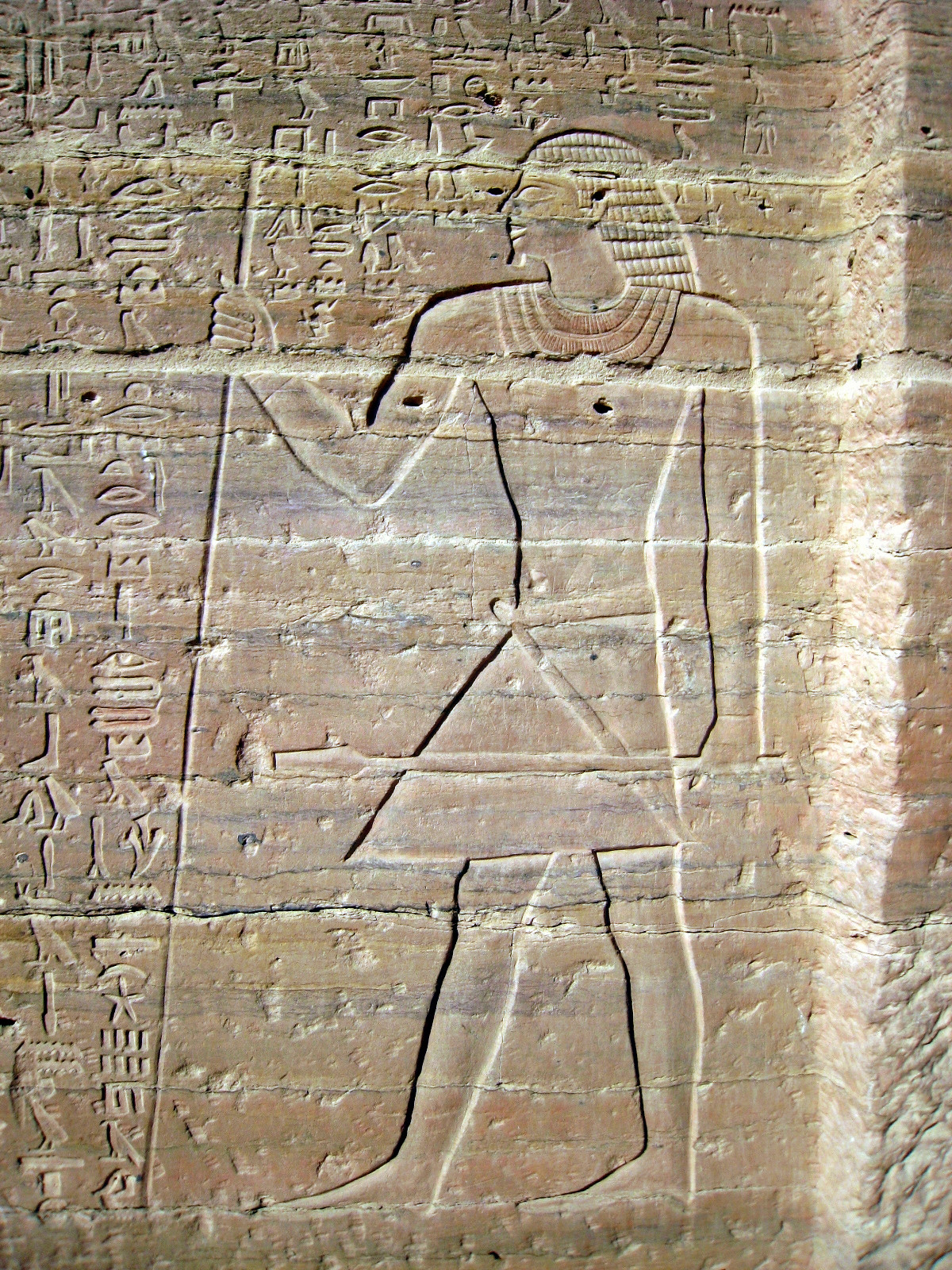
- Harkhuf in a relief from his tomb at Qubbet el-Hawa.
- Successor: possibly Heqaib
- Dynasty: 6th Dynasty
- Pharaoh: Merenre I, Pepi II
- Burial: Qubbet el-Hawa, Tomb 34

The Autobiography of Harkhuf is a private tomb inscription from ancient Egypt. It is significant in Egyptology as one of the two most important, and the most famous, autobiographical inscriptions of Old Kingdom officials.

His name sometimes spelled as Herkhuf, Horkhuf, or Hirkhuf, all that is known of his life comes from the inscriptions in his tomb at Qubbet el-Hawa on the west bank of the Nile at Aswan, near the First Cataract of the Nile. He was a native of Elephantine. Harkhuf served under kings Merenre I, fourth king of the 6th Dynasty (ca. 2255–2246 B.C.), and Pepi II, the last powerful king of the 6th Dynasty (ca. 2246–2152 B.C.). He was appointed governor of Upper Egypt and overseer of caravans under King Merenre I, the third king of the 6th dynasty as his biography notes. His primary business was trade with Nubia, forging political bonds with local leaders, and preparing the ground for an Egyptian expansion into Nubia. He led four major expeditions to Nubia. His written account of these expeditions is the most important source for Egypt's relations with Nubia at this time. On the last expedition, he brought back with him what his correspondence with the young pharaoh Pepi II referred to as a dwarf, apparently a pygmy.

He travelled a considerable distance to a land called Iyam, which probably corresponds to the fertile plain that opens out south of modern Khartoum, where the Blue Nile joins the White. However, Jean Yoyotte thought Iyam was located further north in the Libyan Desert.

The inscriptions in Harkhuf's tomb reflect changes in the Egyptian world view that were occurring during the Late Old Kingdom and the First Intermediate Period, with the person of the king becoming more human and displaying emotions and interests, while commenting on a person leading a moral life by helping his neighbour: "I gave bread to the hungry, clothing to the naked, I ferried him who had no boat."

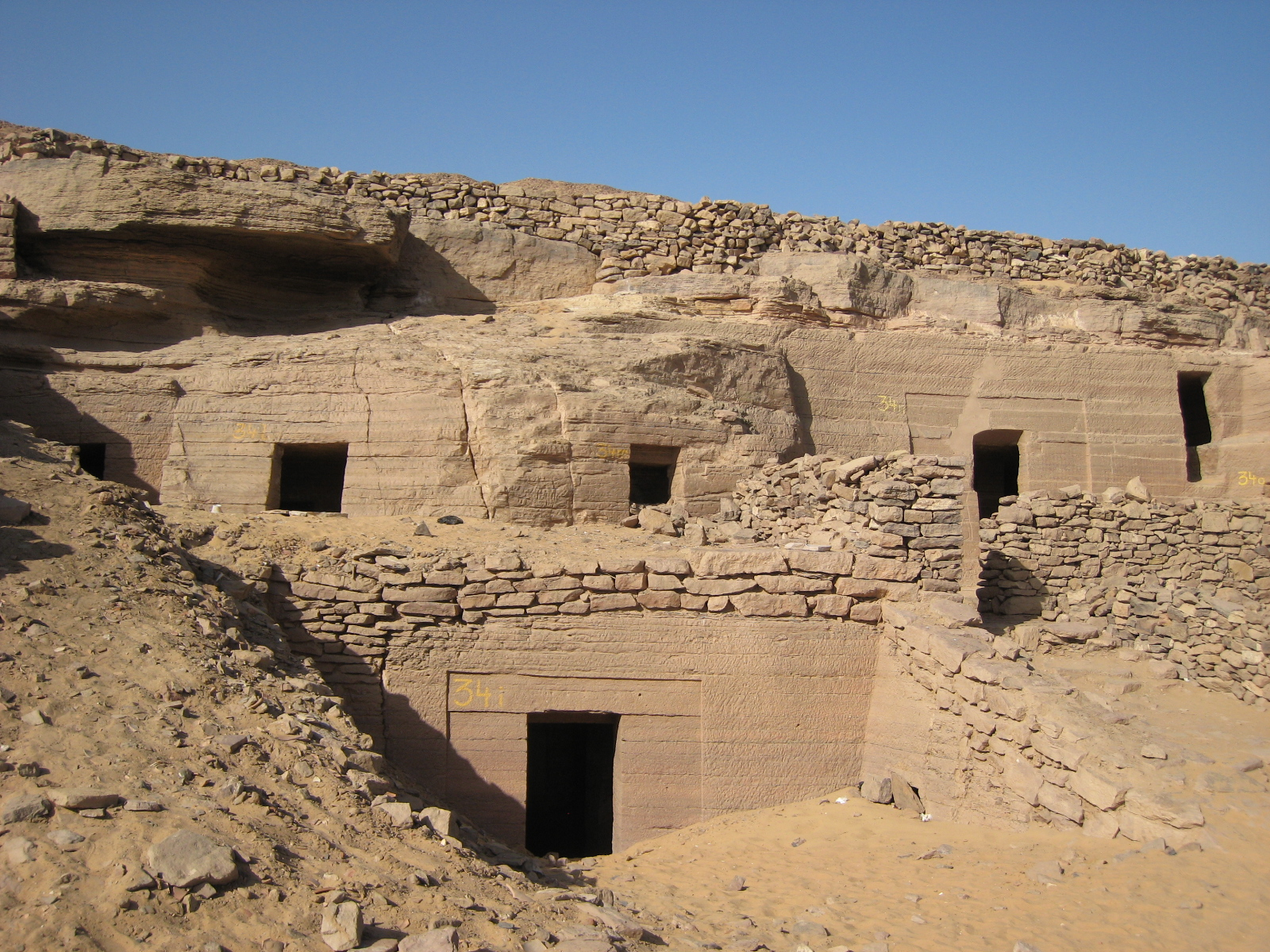
Entrance to the Tomb of Harkhuf (ground floor level)

== Tomb inscription ==
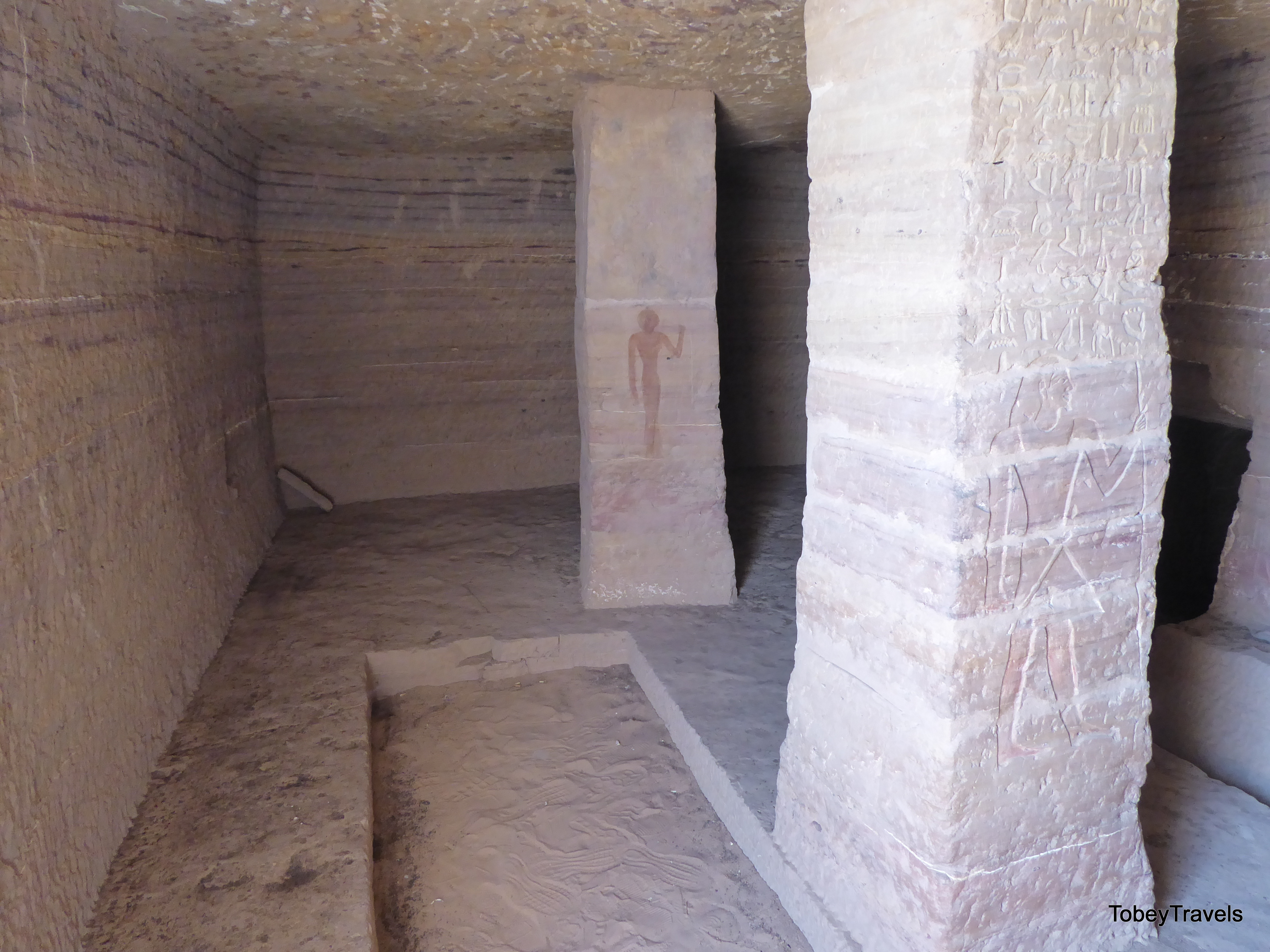
The inner chamber of Harkhuf's tomb.

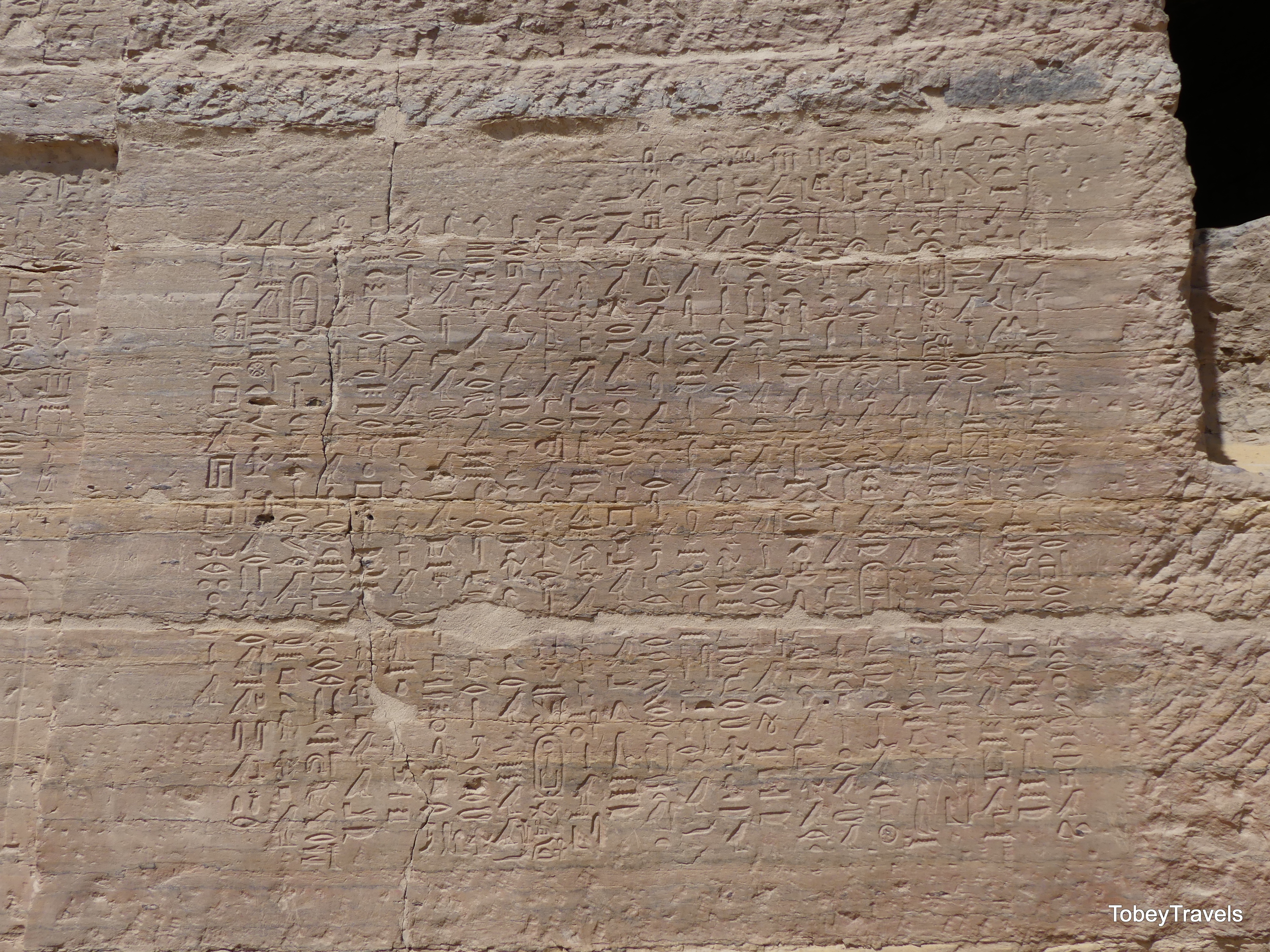
The famous autobiographical tomb inscription by Harkhuf at his tomb entrance. (right and far right side)

The narration of Harkhuf's career is aforementioned by prayers for offerings and a good burial, and the list of virtues - standardized components of tomb-autobiography. Carved on the outside of the soft, flaking stone of the tomb are fifty-eight lines. Listed below are the descriptions of the inscriptions on each side of the tomb.

=== Above the entrance (Eight lines) ===
Harkhuf has prayers for offerings and a good burial. He mentions an "offering which the king gives and Anubis." This shows his significance and hierarchy in Egypt. Even the king gives an offering, revealing even further. Harkhuf states his titles such as Governor of Upper Egypt, prays for a peaceful journey in the afterlife, and mentions many feasts and that he be celebrated. Lastly, a list of his virtues is included, such as never judging between two, helping other civilians, and building a house. This is very similar to the duties of a king; Harkuf, who is a highly esteemed priest has these king-like qualities to him.

=== Right side of entrance (Fourteen lines) ===
Harkhuf accounts his expedition to Yam (located in Upper Nubia), the first time with his father, bearing gifts and products. The second trip was done alone where he traveled back through other foreign lands, noting that this has not been done by anyone else before, and again, bearing beautiful gifts. The third trip to Yam, he found that the ruler had gone to Tjemeh-land to smite the Tjemeh; however, Harkhuf was able to please the ruler of Yam, and Yam's ruler praised all the gods.

=== Left side of entrance (Ten lines) ===
After satisfying the ruler of Yam, Harkhuf came down through the south of Irtjet and north of Setju. He found their ruler, who was impressed by all of his goods and products as well as the numerous troops from Yam with him, and led him with an escort to Irtjet's mountain path.

=== On the far right (Twenty-six lines) ===
Harkhuf's tomb describes the text of a letter he received from the king Neferkare (ie. Pepi II), where he vividly expresses his eagerness to see the pygmy whom Harkhuf was bringing back with him. For his success, Harkhuf is promised with many worthy honors by the king.

Harkhuf's expeditions stated the only purpose was to reach Yam, acquire the desired products, and return to Egypt.
