= Ishemai =

Ancient Egyptian official

Ishemai (fl. c. 2150 BC) was an ancient Egyptian official at the end of the Old Kingdom. He is mainly known from his rock cut tomb found at the Qubbet el-Hawa. Ishemai had several titles, including royal sealer, sole friend, lector priest, and great overlord of the king.

His rock cut tomb at Qubbet el-Hawa consists of one bigger main cult chapel and several smaller rooms. The main chapel is supported by three rock cut pillars. On the walls of the chapel and on one of the pillars are four panels. They contain painted reliefs, showing Ishemai in front of servants and offering beares. The paint on the reliefs is today still very well preserved.
