= Tomb of Sarenput II =

Ancient Egyptian tomb near Aswan

QH31
- Burial site of Sarenput II
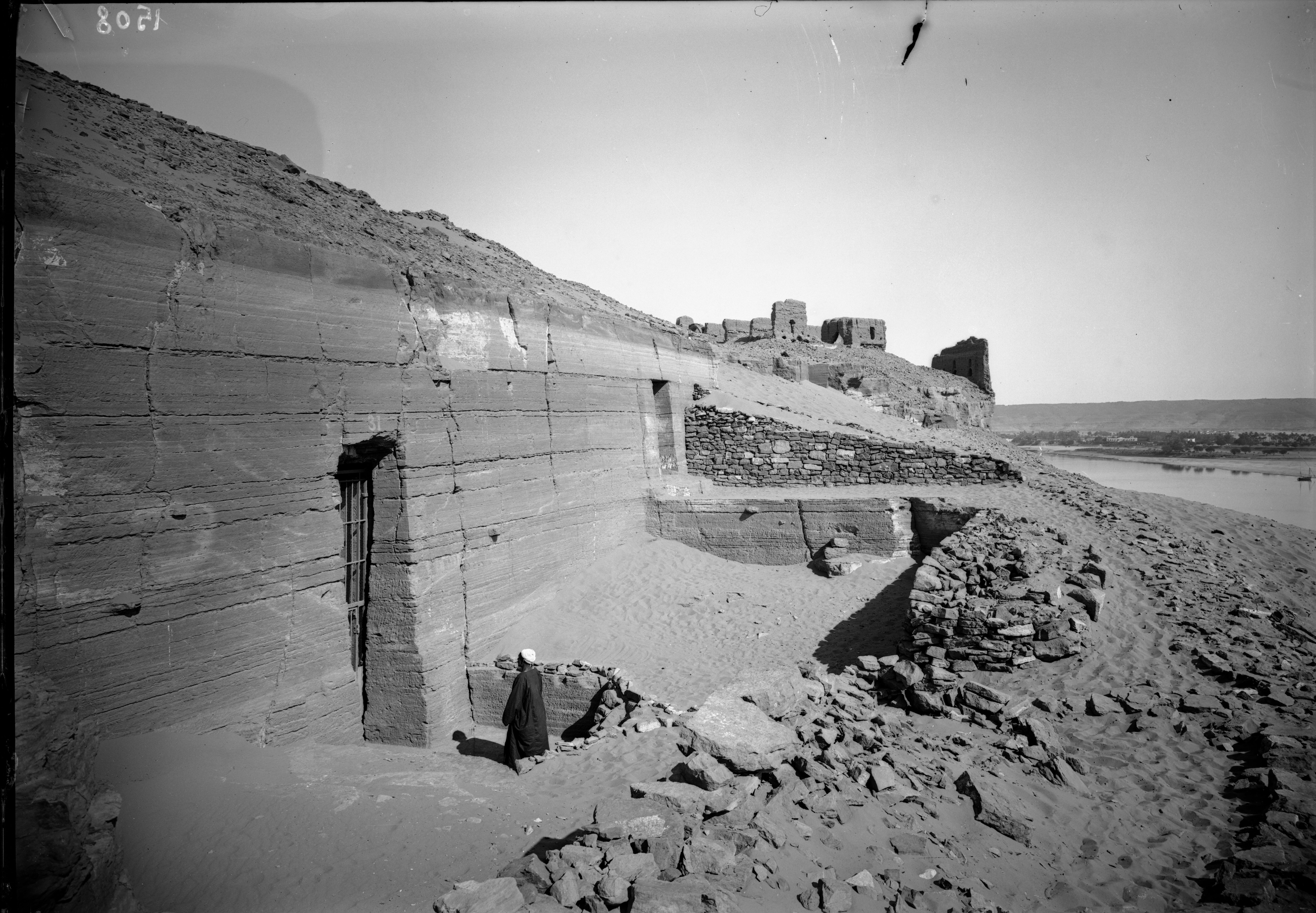
- Entrance to the tomb of Sarenput II (QH31) in 1914

- Location within Egypt
- Location: Qubbet el-Hawa, near Aswan
- Excavated by: Ernesto Schiaparelli
- Decoration: Painted decoration in the second chamber
- Layout: Rock-cut funerary complex
- ← Previous; QH30 Next → QH32

G39 r n p w t
Sarenput II
in hieroglyphs
Era: Middle Kingdom
(2055–1650 BC)

The Tomb of Sarenput II, also identified as QH31, is an ancient Egyptian rock-cut tomb in the necropolis of Qubbet el-Hawa, on the west bank of the Nile near Aswan, Egypt. The tomb belonged to a nomarch and official of Elephantine during the Twelfth Dynasty of Egypt, Sarenput II, also called Nubkaurenakht. The complex dates to the Middle Kingdom, and a reconstruction of the building sequence at Qubbet el-Hawa places QH31 in the reigns of Senusret II and Senusret III. QH31 is part of a group of rock-cut funerary complexes, also including QH32 and QH33, built on the south-eastern slope of the necropolis of Qubbet el-Hawa.

== Tomb owner ==
QH31 was made for Sarenput II, also called Nubkaurenakht. Sarenput II was the son of Khema and Satethotep and succeeded his father as the leading local official of Elephantine. His recorded titles include nomarch, overseer of the prophets of Khnum of Elephantine and commander of the frontier garrison of the Southern Lands. The second name Nubkaurenakht was connected with Amenemhat II by the Polychrome Hieroglyph Research Project, which glosses it as meaning "Amenemhat is strong".

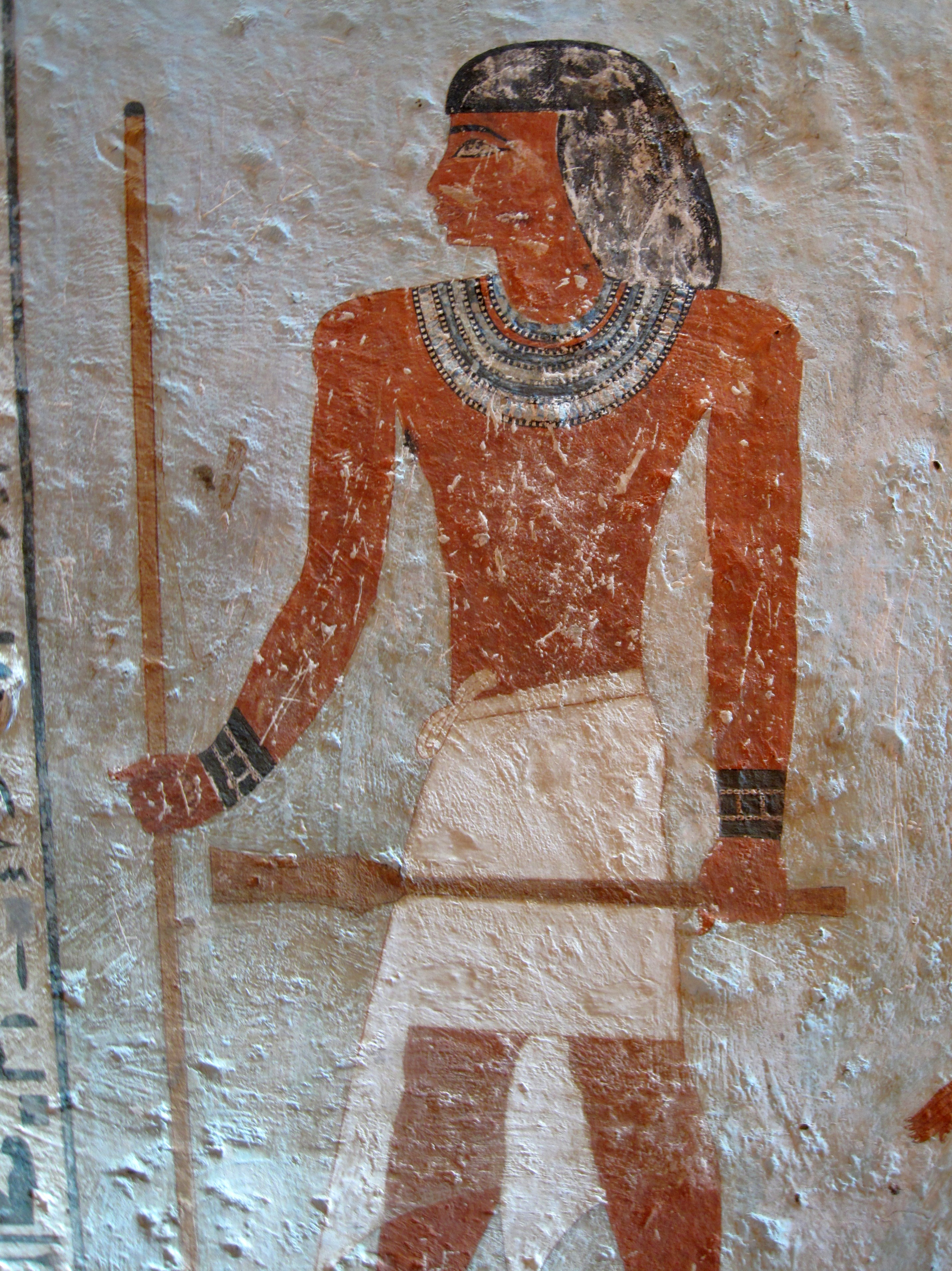
Representation of Sarenput II in the corridor of QH31.

== Excavation and documentation ==
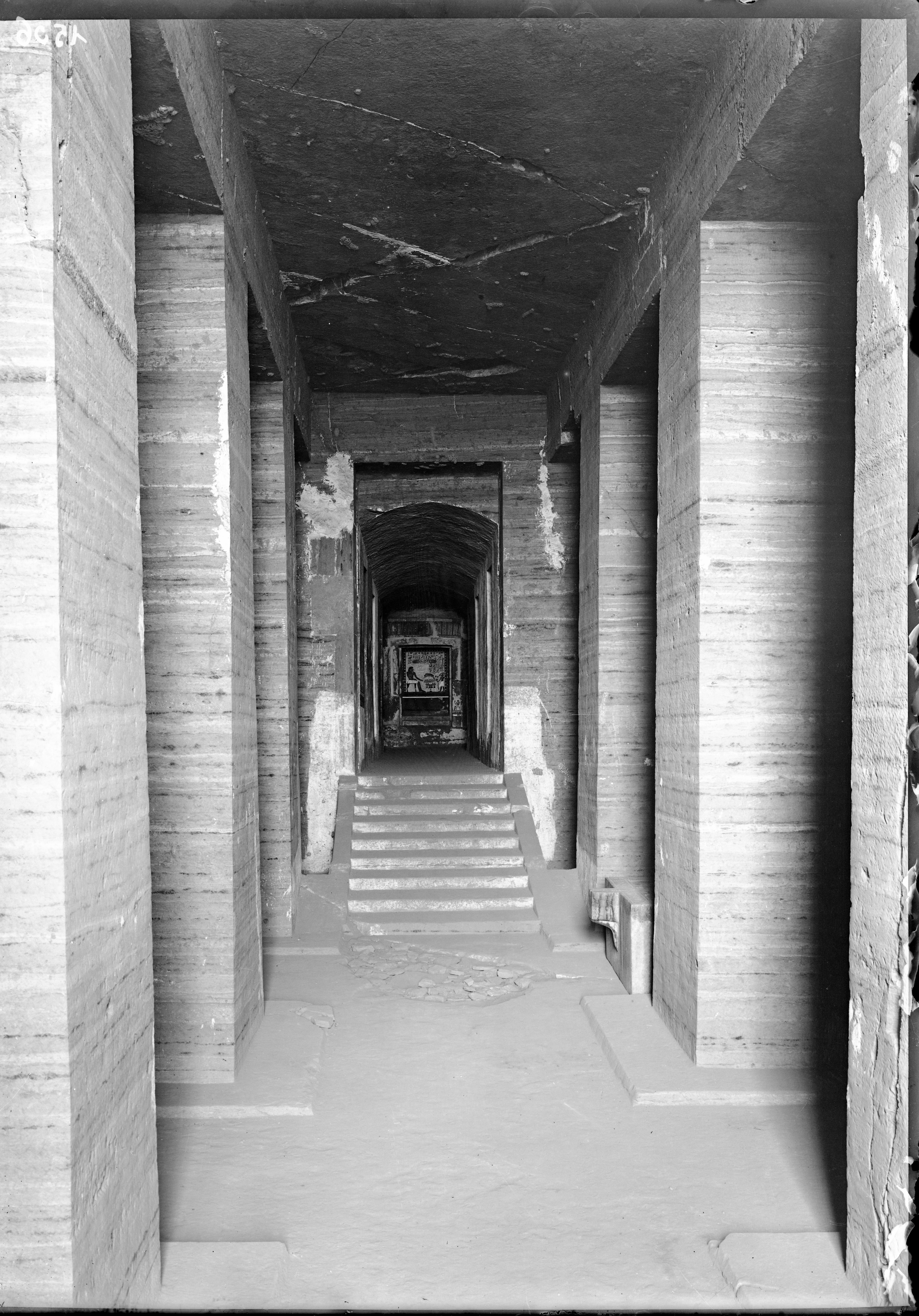
Interior of QH31 in 1914; wall paintings in the second chamber are visible at the back.

The Museo Egizio Turin Photo Archive holds nine photographs of QH31 made in 1914 during Schiaparelli's excavations at Qubbet el-Hawa. The photographs document the entrance, the interior of the tomb, the paintings in the second chamber and wall paintings on which preparatory grid lines are visible.

Since 2008, the archaeological project of the University of Jaén has worked in the necropolis of Qubbet el-Hawa. In 2015, the project expanded its research aims to Twelfth Dynasty funerary shafts, including those of Sarenput I (QH36), QH32, Sarenput II (QH31) and Heqaib II (QH30). During archaeological works in the tomb of Sarenput II in 2019, polychrome fragments of small inscribed boxes were found, and Antonio Morales was assigned their study and translation.

Museo Egizio Photo Archive, 1914

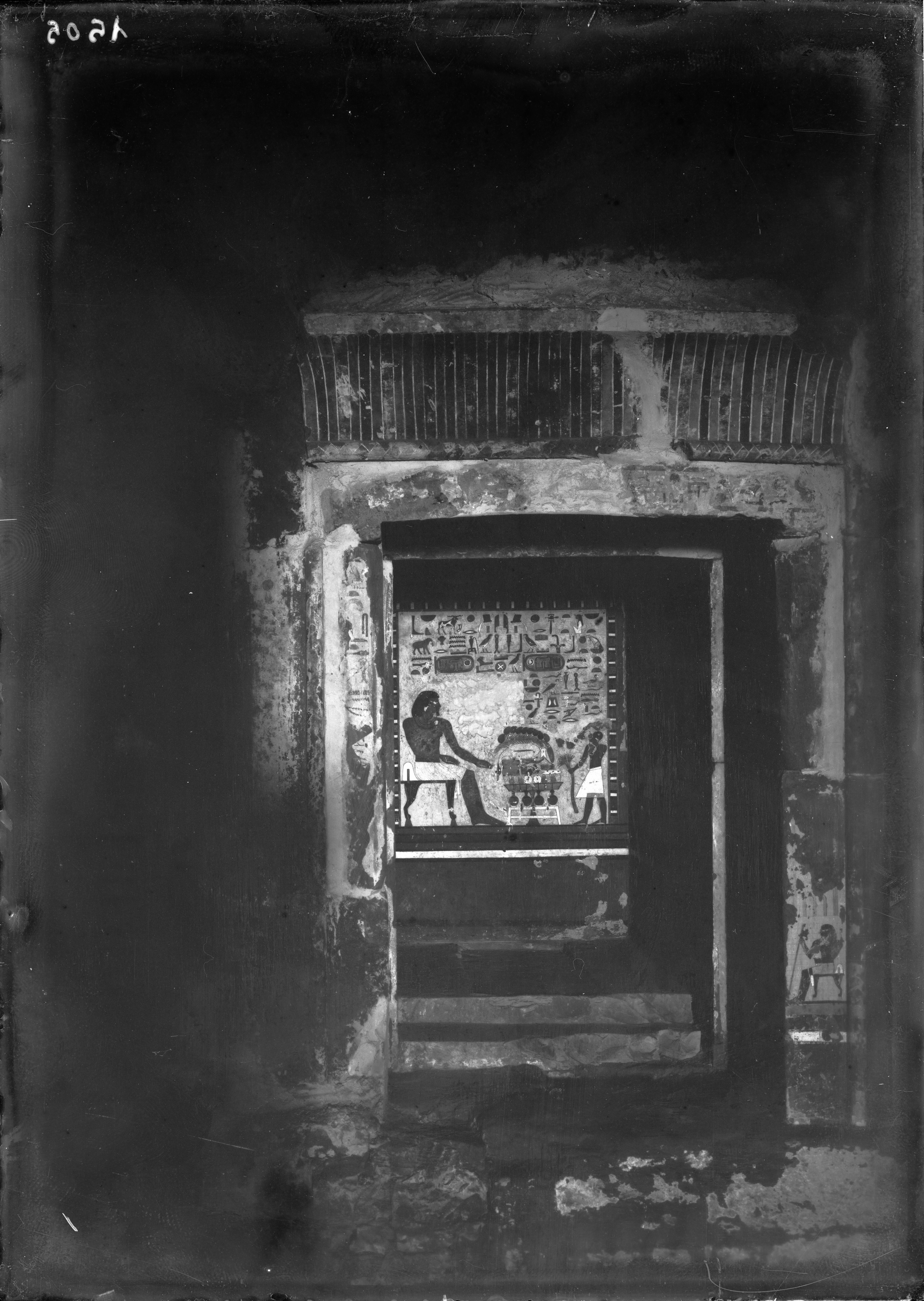
Painting on the west side of the second chamber.

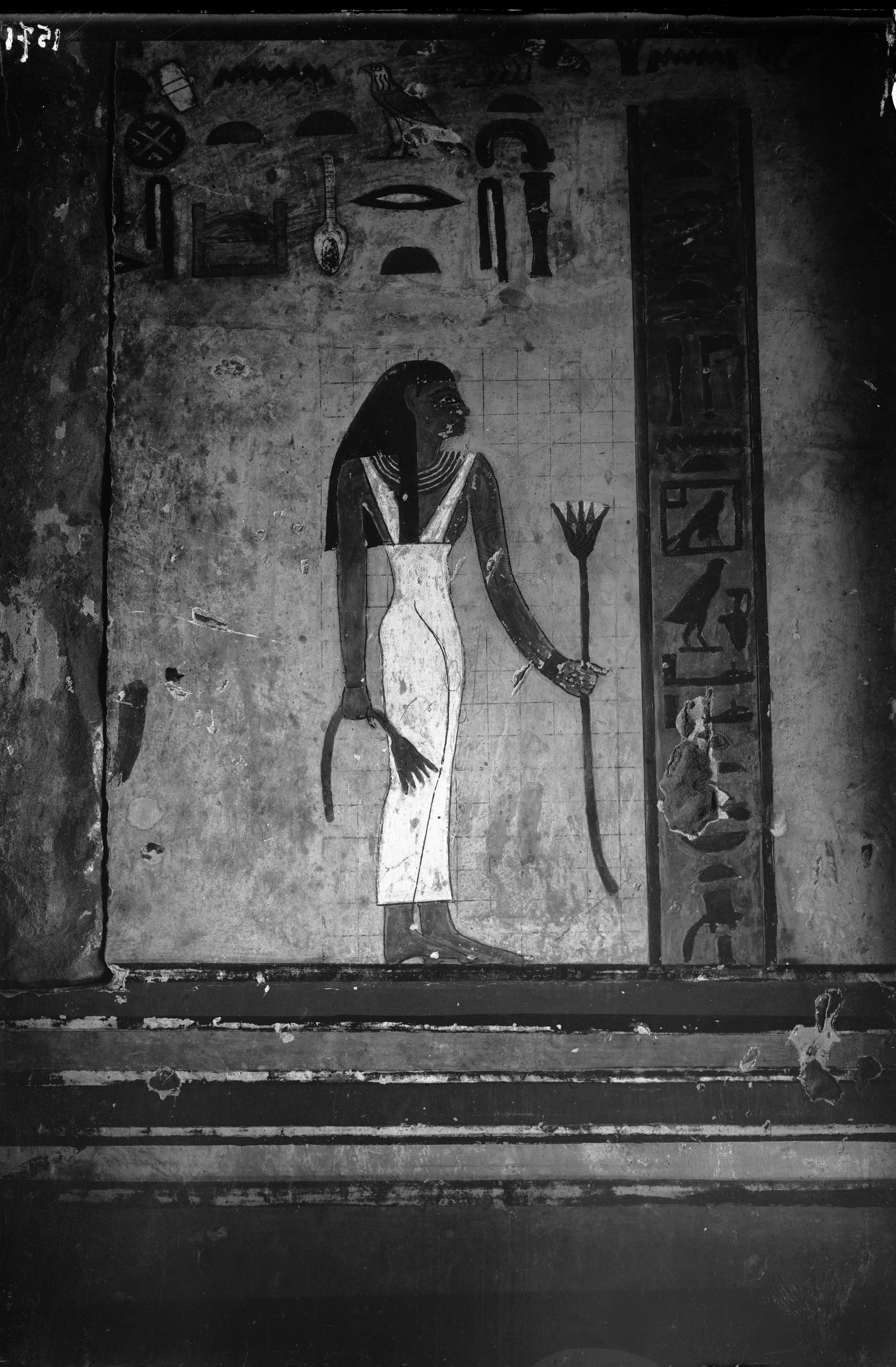
South side of the second chamber, with visible preparatory grid lines.

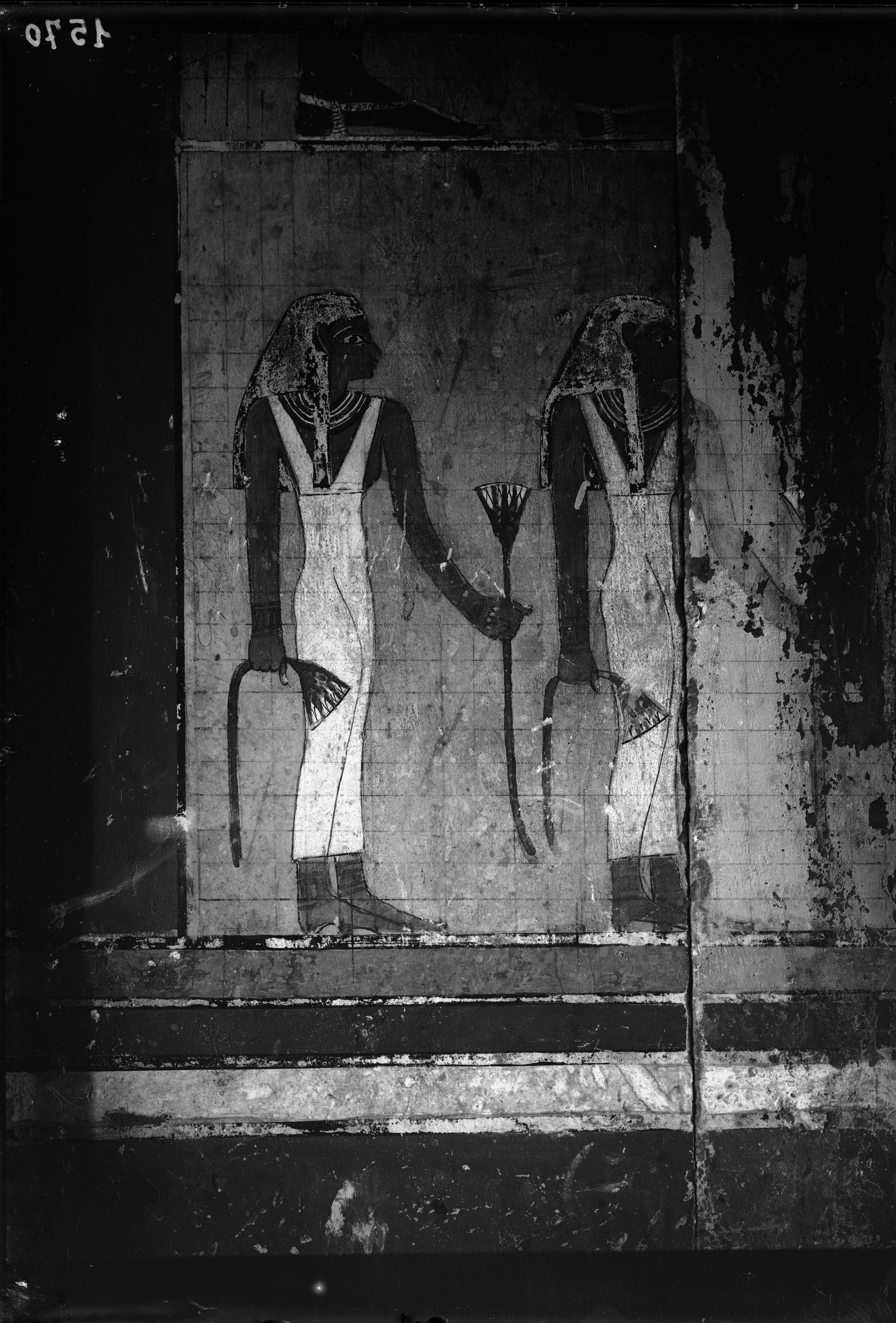
North side of the second chamber, with visible preparatory grid lines.

== Description ==
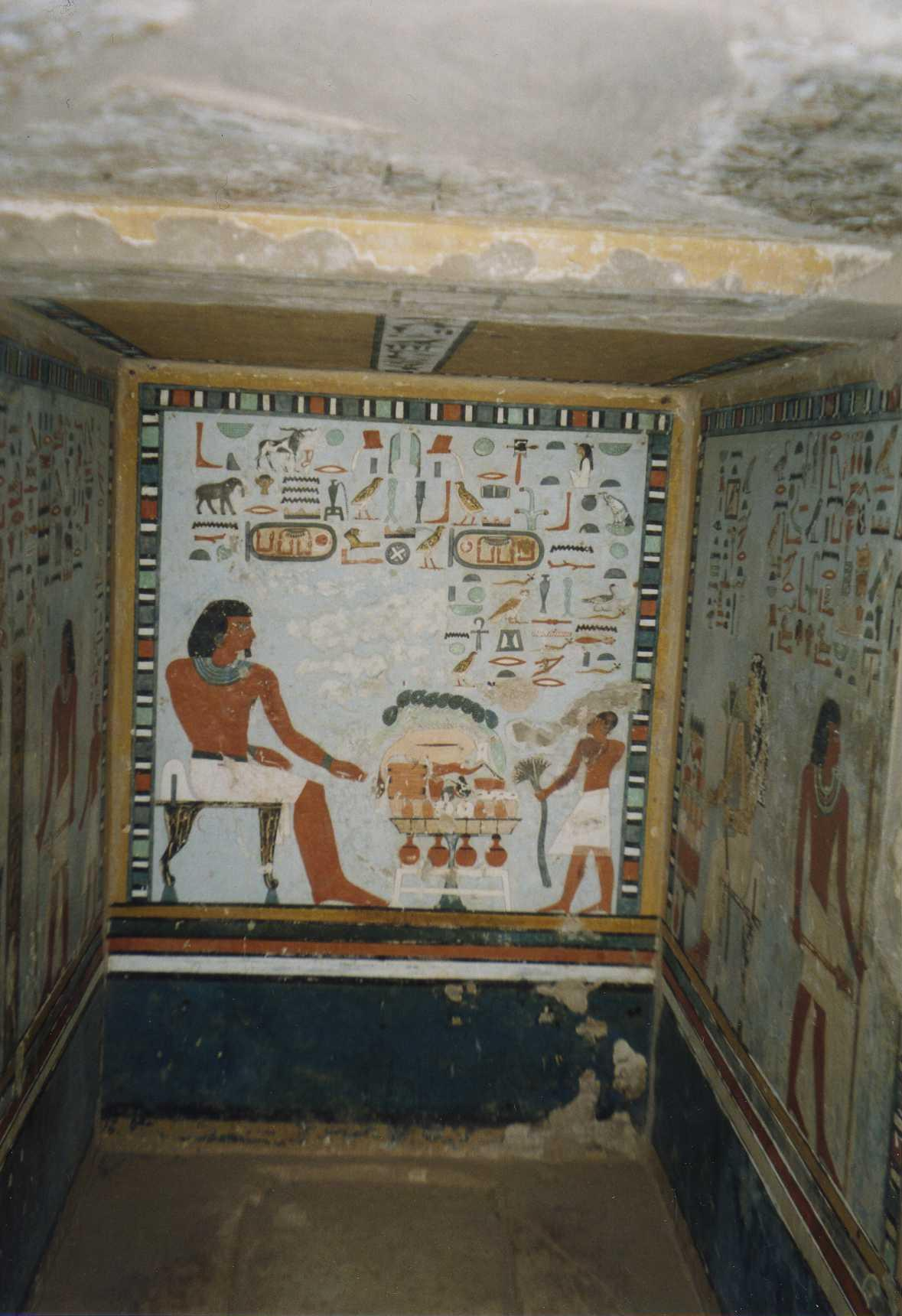
Decorated niche in QH31.

The QH31 funerary complex, like the other hypogea in the necropolis of Qubbet el-Hawa, was excavated directly into the rock. A geochemical study of the chapel describes several architectural elements as probably made independently from the in situ excavation and then placed in the complex as part of the funerary design. These elements include three pairs of Osirian statues in the corridor, four pillars in the offering chamber and slabs used to construct the sanctuary of the tomb owner's statue.

The tomb includes interior rooms with painted decoration documented in the photographs from Schiaparelli's 1914 excavations. The second chamber preserves paintings on the back wall, while paintings on the south and north sides show visible preparatory grid lines on the decorated surface. Non-invasive analyses carried out in 2018 on elements of the chapel, including Osirian statues and materials from the sanctuary, indicated the use of sandstone similar to that of the local rock of the necropolis.

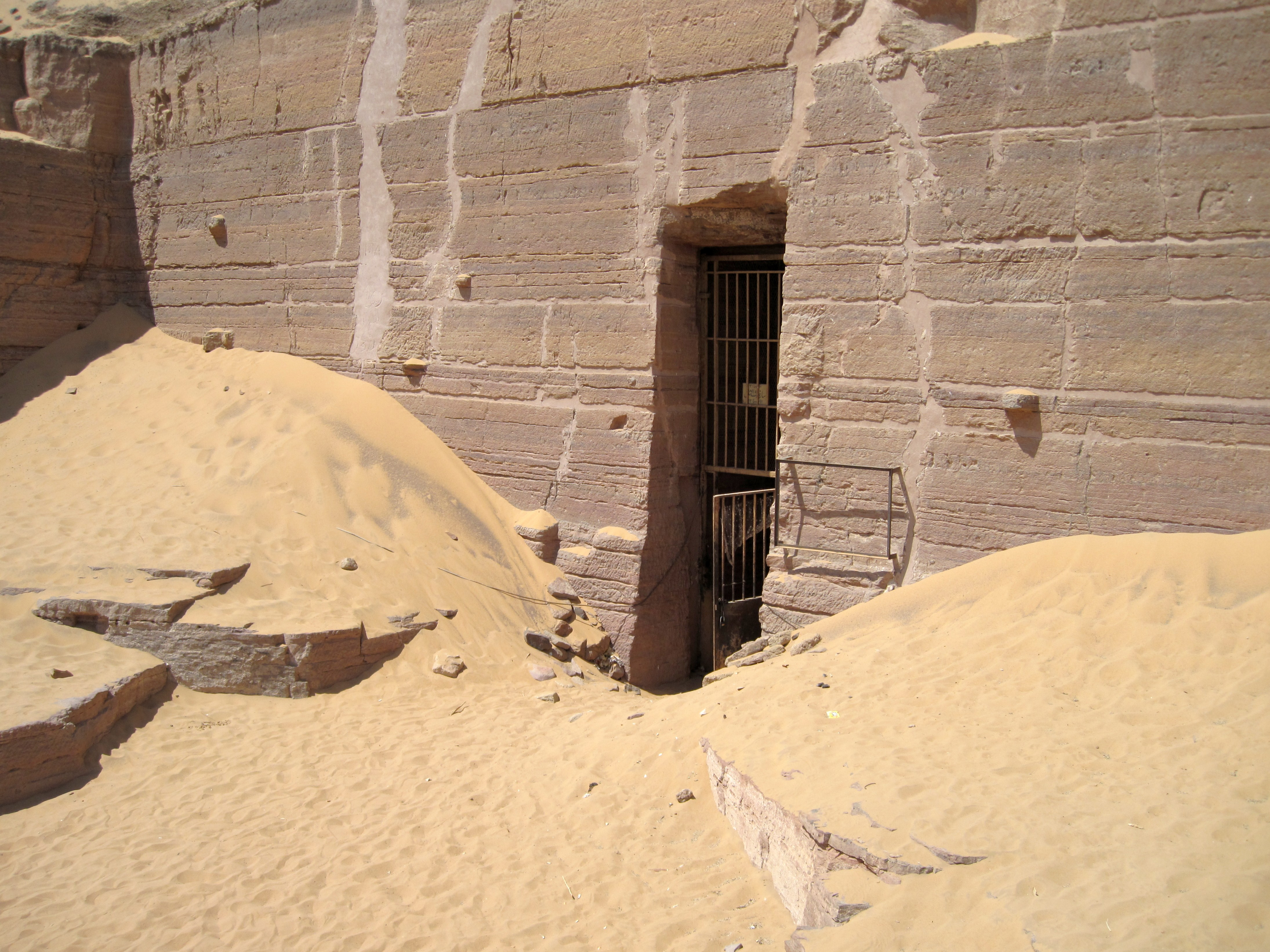
Entrance to the rock-cut tomb of Sarenput II at Qubbet el-Hawa.

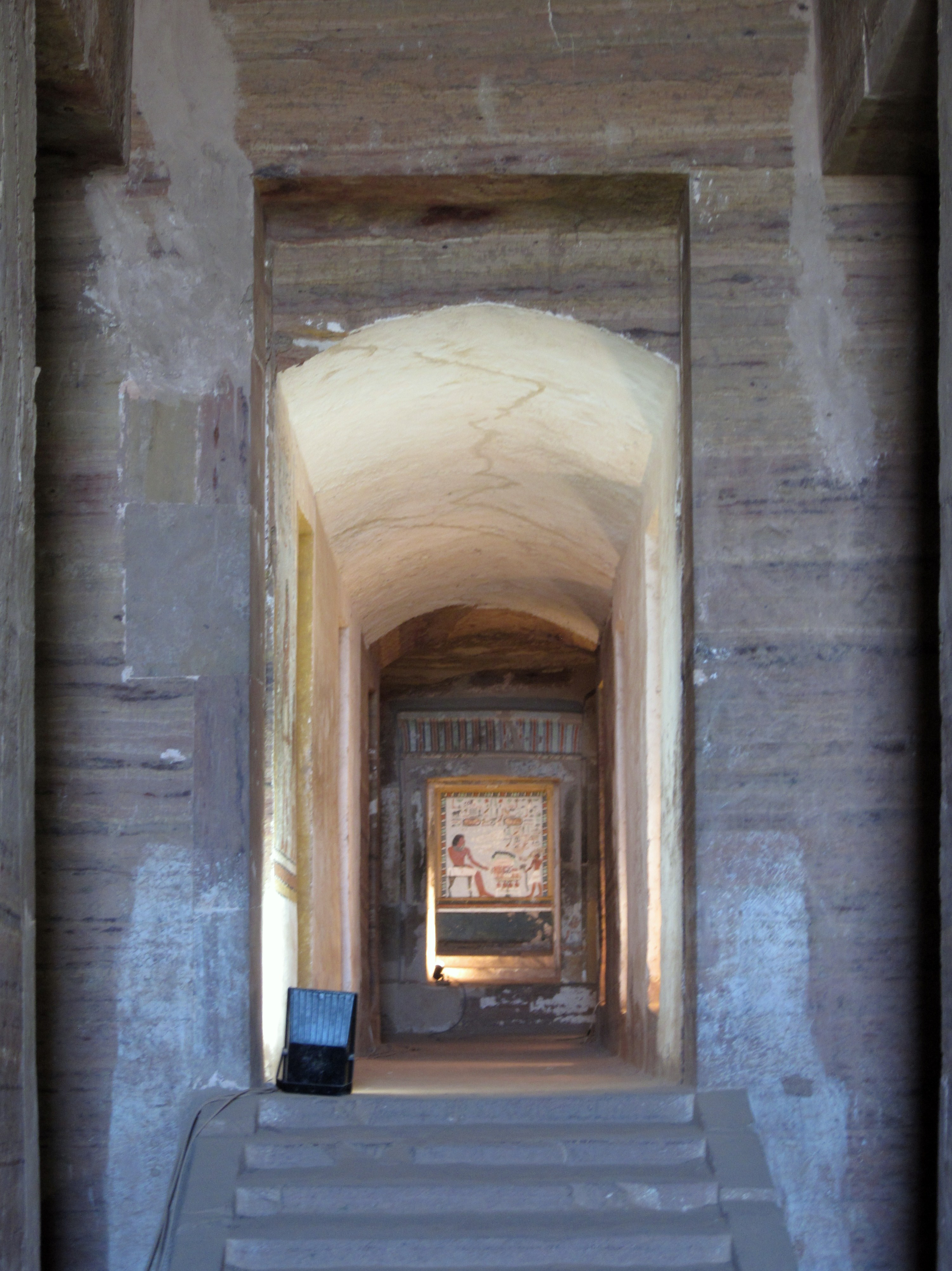
Interior corridor of the rock-cut tomb of Sarenput II.

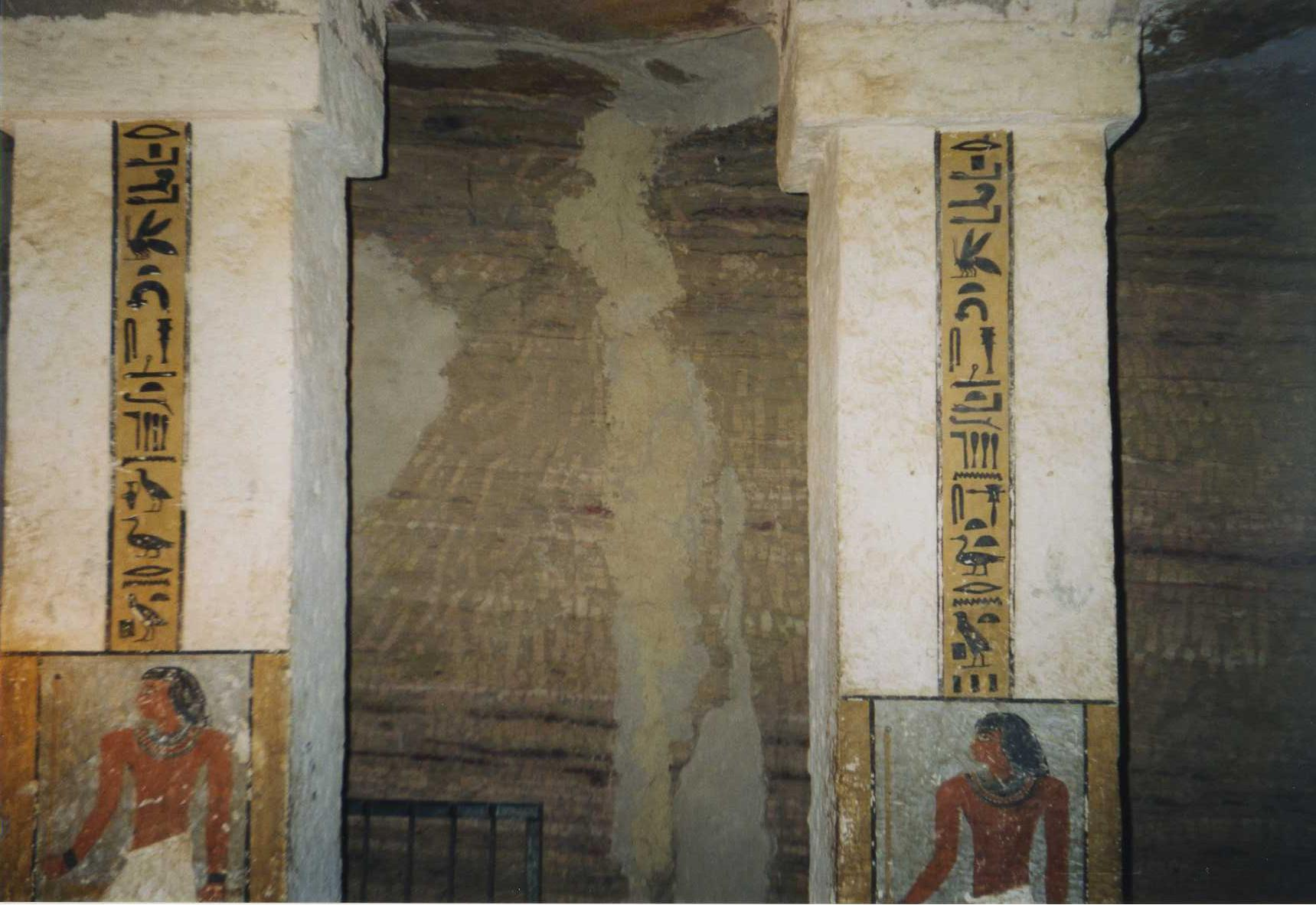
Decorated pillars in QH31.

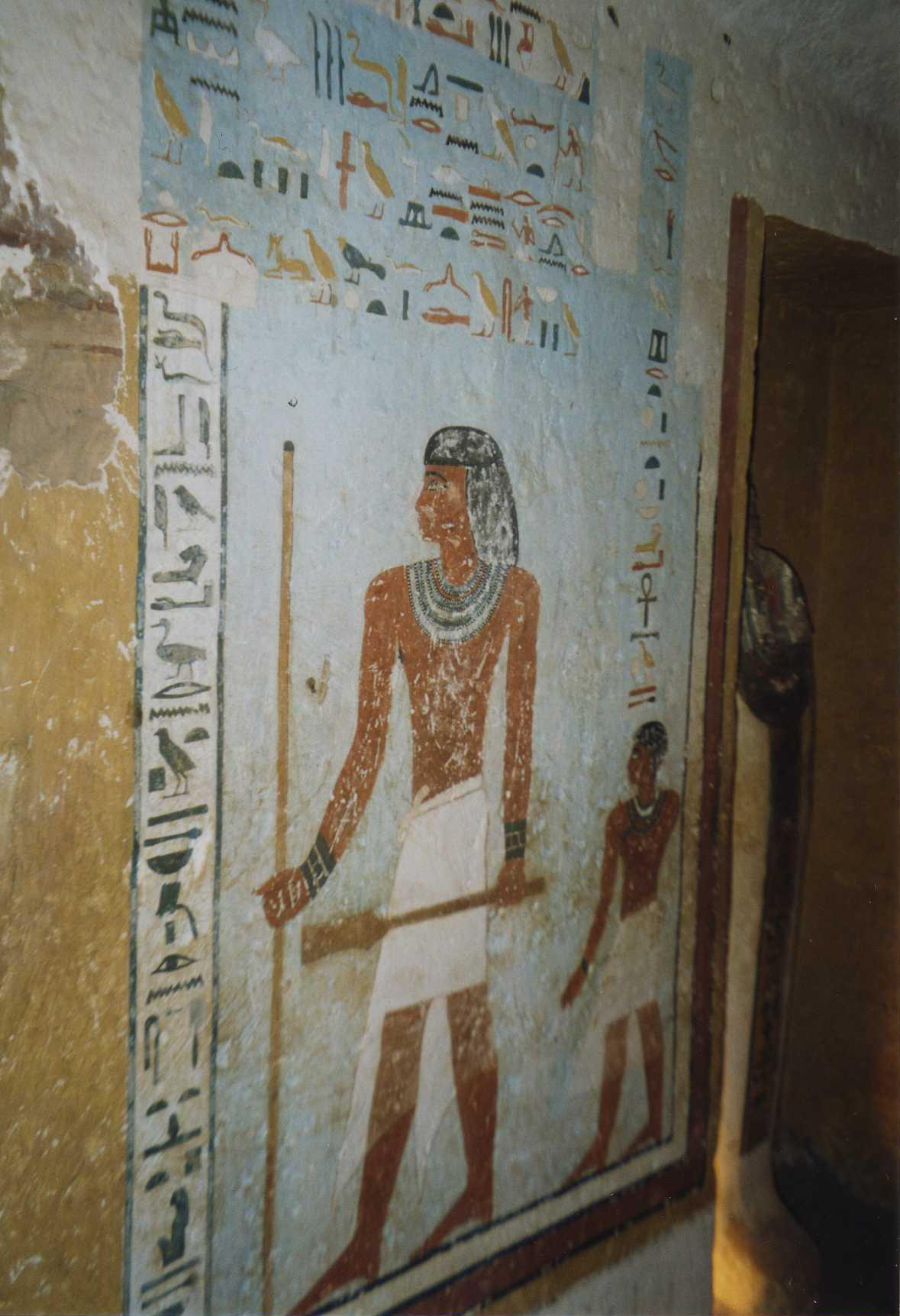
Representation of Sarenput II in the corridor of QH31.

== See also ==
- Aswan
- Cataracts of the Nile
- Elephantine
- Middle Kingdom of Egypt
- Nomarch
- Rock-cut tomb
- Tomb of Sarenput I
- Twelfth Dynasty of Egypt

== Bibliography ==
- Jiménez-Serrano, Alejandro; Sánchez-León, Juan Carlos (2016). "Ipi, a new governor of Elephantine under Amenemhat II". Chronique d'Égypte. 91 (181): 5–13. doi:10.1484/J.CDE.5.111739.
- Martínez-Hermoso, Juan Antonio (2019). "Virtual reconstruction of the QH31, QH32, QH33 & QH34 hypogea's outer courtyards construction sequence". EGA. Revista de Expresión Gráfica Arquitectónica. 24 (37): 108–119. doi:10.4995/ega.2019.7809. hdl:10251/138216.
- Martínez Hermoso, Juan Antonio; Ayora Cañada, María José; Domínguez Vidal, Ana (2019). "Elementos arquitectónicos de la capilla funeraria de Sarenput II (QH31) en Qubbet el-Hawa. Caracterización geoquímica". Trabajos de Egiptología. Papers on Ancient Egypt (in Spanish) (10): 227–240. doi:10.25145/j.TdE.2019.10.13.
- Martínez-Hermoso, Juan Antonio; Mellado-García, Israel; Martínez de Dios, Juan Luis; Martínez-Hermoso, Fernando; Espejo-Jiménez, Ana María; Jiménez-Serrano, Alejandro (2018). "The construction of tomb group QH31 (Sarenput II) through QH33. Part I: The exterior of the funerary complexes" (PDF). The Journal of Ancient Egyptian Architecture. 3: 25–44. ISSN 2472-999X.
