= Sabni =

- Overseer of Upper Egypt
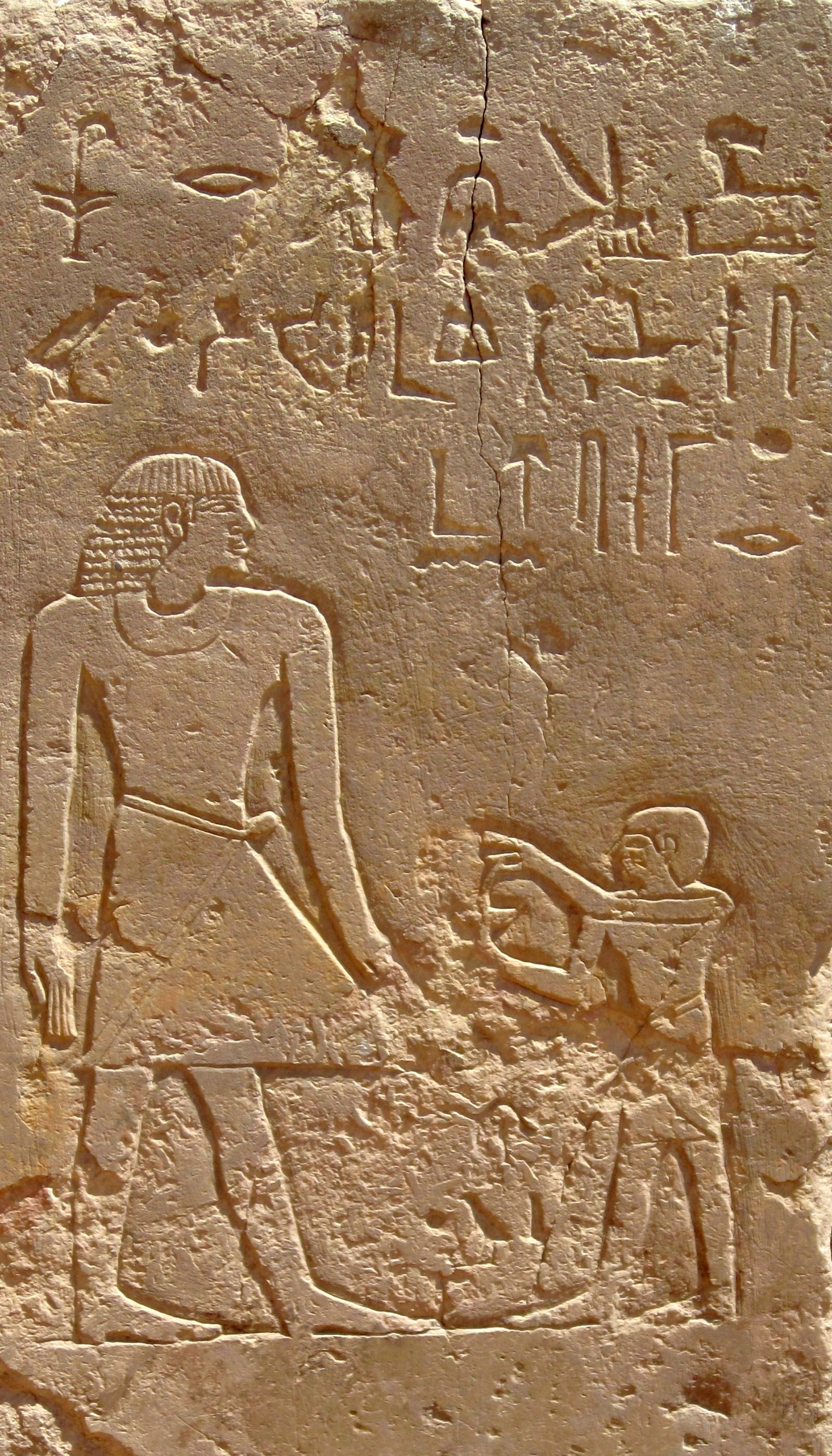
- Depiction of Sabni at the entrance to his tomb
- Burial: Aswan, Egypt
- Father: Mekhu
- Children: Antef and Itety

Sabni (fl. c. 2250 BC) was an ancient Egyptian official of the Old Kingdom under king Pepi II. He was an expedition leader undertaking enterprises to Nubia. He is mainly known from his rock cut at Qubbet el-Hawa (near modern Aswan in the South of Egypt).

Sabni has a rock cut tomb in Qubbet el-Hawa. The tomb consist of two parts. Overground there is the decorated funerary chapel for the cult of the deceased. Under that there are five shafts with chambers for the burials of Sabni, but also for family members. On the facade of the tomb is carved a long biographical inscription, reporting his expeditions to Nubia, where he was collecting the body of his dead father Mekhu, who died there in an earlier expedition. However, the inscription is today largely destroyed. Behind the entrance, there opens a big hall supported by 14 pillars and again carved into the rock. At the back of the hall, there is the false door for Sabni. On the walls and pillars of the hall are carved panels showing Sabni, family members but also funerary priests. One bigger panel shows Sabni and his father Mekhu hunting in the marsches. His father is Mekhu who shared the tomb with Sabni. Both tombs are carved into the rock side by side, while the main halls of the cult chapels as united. Sabni hold several important titles, such as count, royal sealer, overseer of Upper Egypt, sole friend, overseer of the foreign lands and lector priest.

In Sabni's tomb are depicted several family members. His wife was the sole ornamented of the king Setka. He had a son named Antef and a daughter Itety.

Sabni is also known from a letter, found on Elephantine. In the letter, Sabni is accused of stealing things.
