= Qubbet el-Hawa =

Archaeological site in Egypt

Coordinates: 24°06′06.37″N 32°53′20.97″E

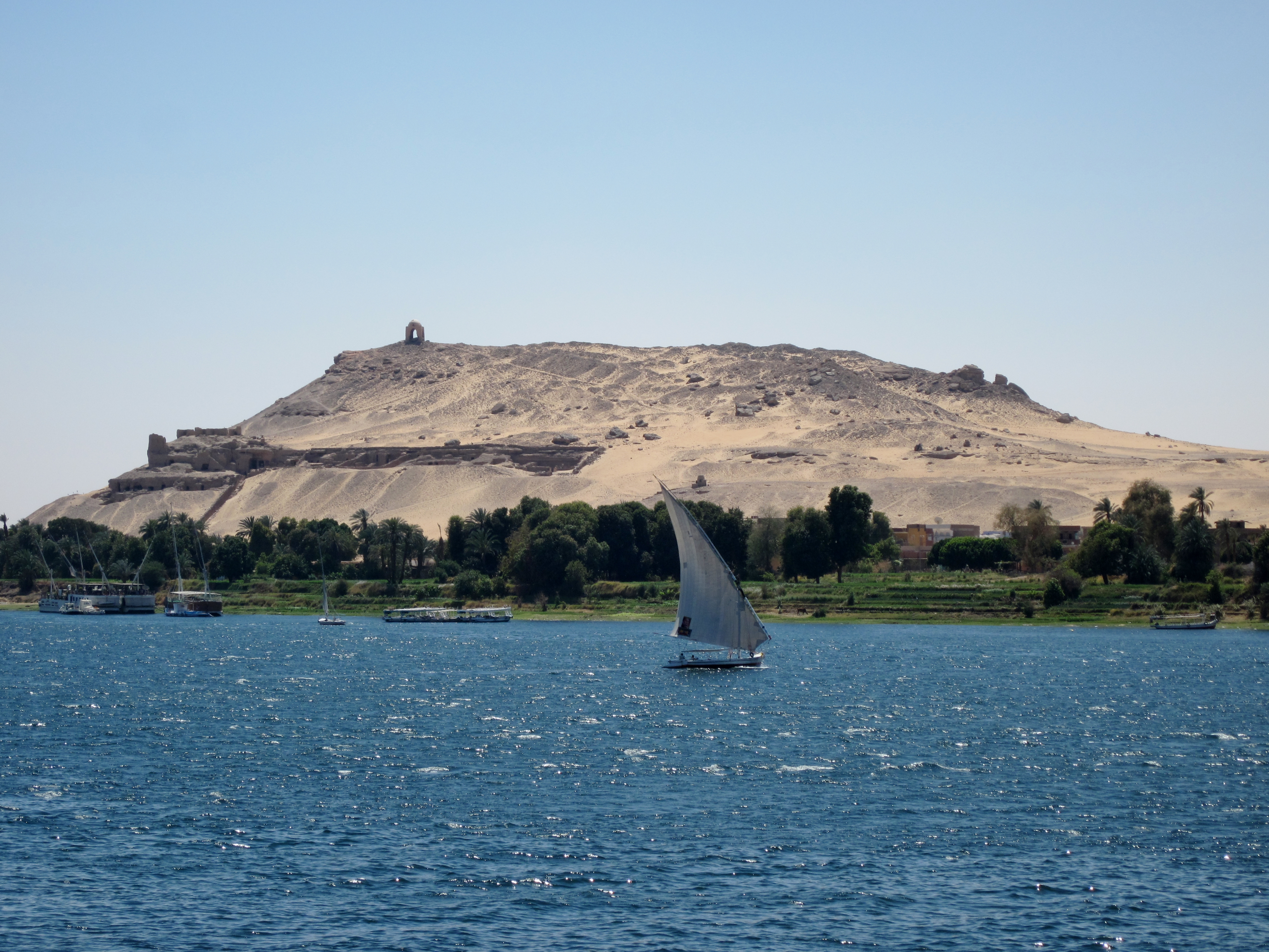
Qubbet el-Hawa

Qubbet el-Hawa (Arabic: قبة الهوا) or "Dome of the Wind" is a site on the western bank of the Nile, opposite Aswan, that serves as the resting place of ancient nobles and priests from the Old and Middle Kingdoms of ancient Egypt. The necropolis was in use from the Fourth Dynasty of Egypt until the Roman Period.

The site was inscribed on the UNESCO World Heritage List in 1979 along with other examples of Upper Egyptian architecture, as part of the "Nubian Monuments from Abu Simbel to Philae" (despite Qubbet el-Hawa being neither Nubian, nor between Abu Simbel and Philae).

== Name ==
The name is derived from the dome of the tomb of an Islamic sheikh, but archaeologically, it is usually understood as referring to the site of the tombs of the officials lined up on artificial terraces below the summit of the Nile bank upon which the Islamic tomb stands.

== Tombs of the Nobles ==
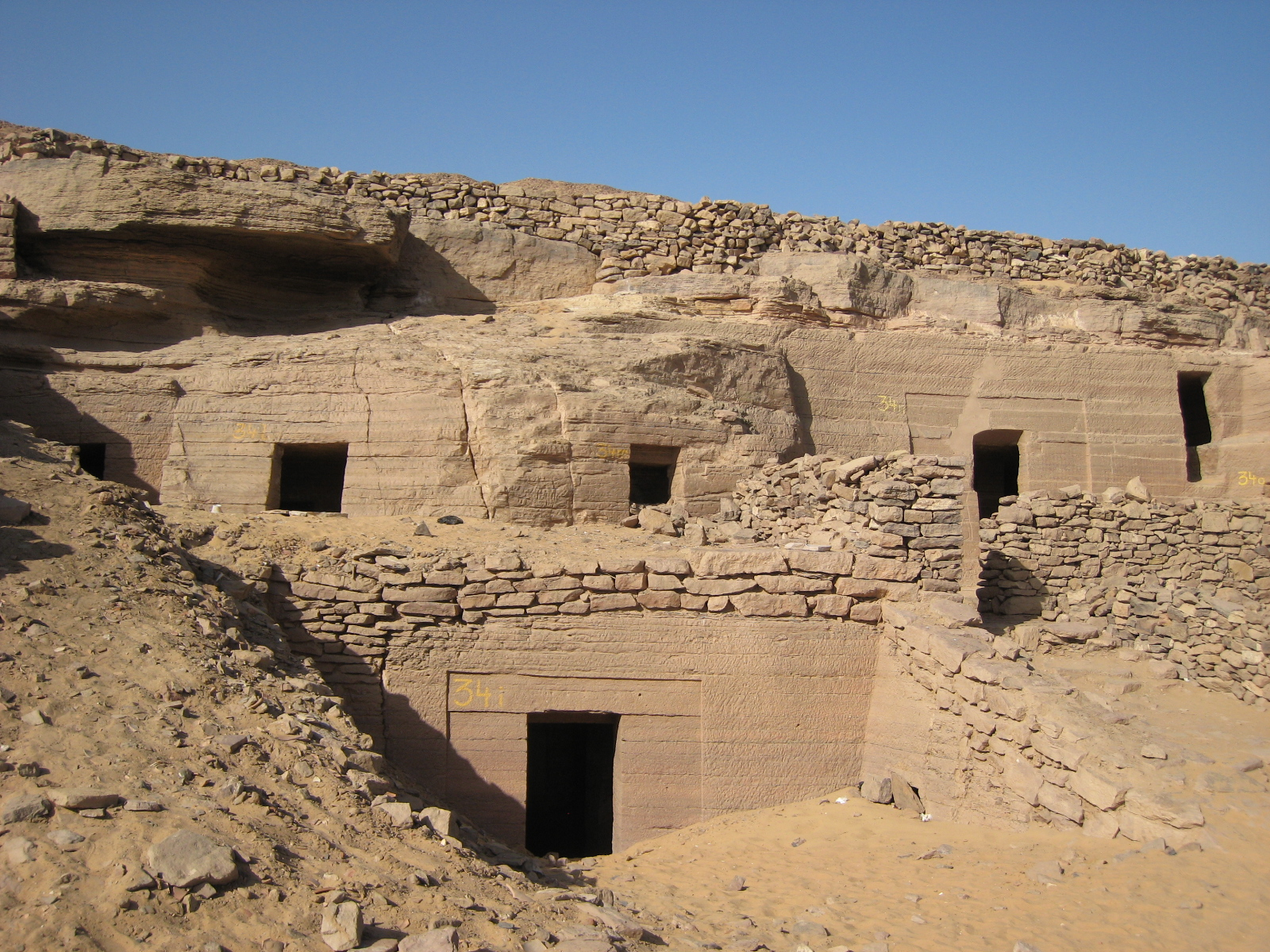
The tomb of Harkhuf and other tombs on the Qubbet el-Hawa

There have been about 100 tombs discovered as of July 2022. The official website of the Egyptian Ministry of Tourism and Antiquities writes that the inscriptions on the walls of the tombs here highlight the importance of the roles nobles played during this period of history, such as launching exploratory and commercial voyages and leading military campaigns.

=== Old Kingdom ===
The majority of the tombs date from the Old Kingdom and provide an insight into the burial traditions of Upper Egyptian Nome 1 during the later Old Kingdom. Examples include Mekhu and his son Sabni from the Sixth Dynasty. Mekhu and Sabni's tombs describes the former leading a royal expedition to the south and, upon his return, being attacked and killed by Nubians; Sabni is said to wage a counterattack to recover his father's body and seek revenge. Others include Sobekhotep who served as a seal-bearer of the King of Lower Egypt in the Fifth Dynasty, Ishemai (QH 98 - dated to 6th dynasty pharaoh Pepi II), Heqaib, and Harkhuf. One tomb, QH 33, was found to be oriented to the winter solstice. Among the most important tombs are those of the expedition leaders (like Harkhuf) dispatched to distant lands to negotiate the acquisition of foreign goods for the Egyptian court.

Old Kingdom tombs documented by the Museo Egizio photographic archive

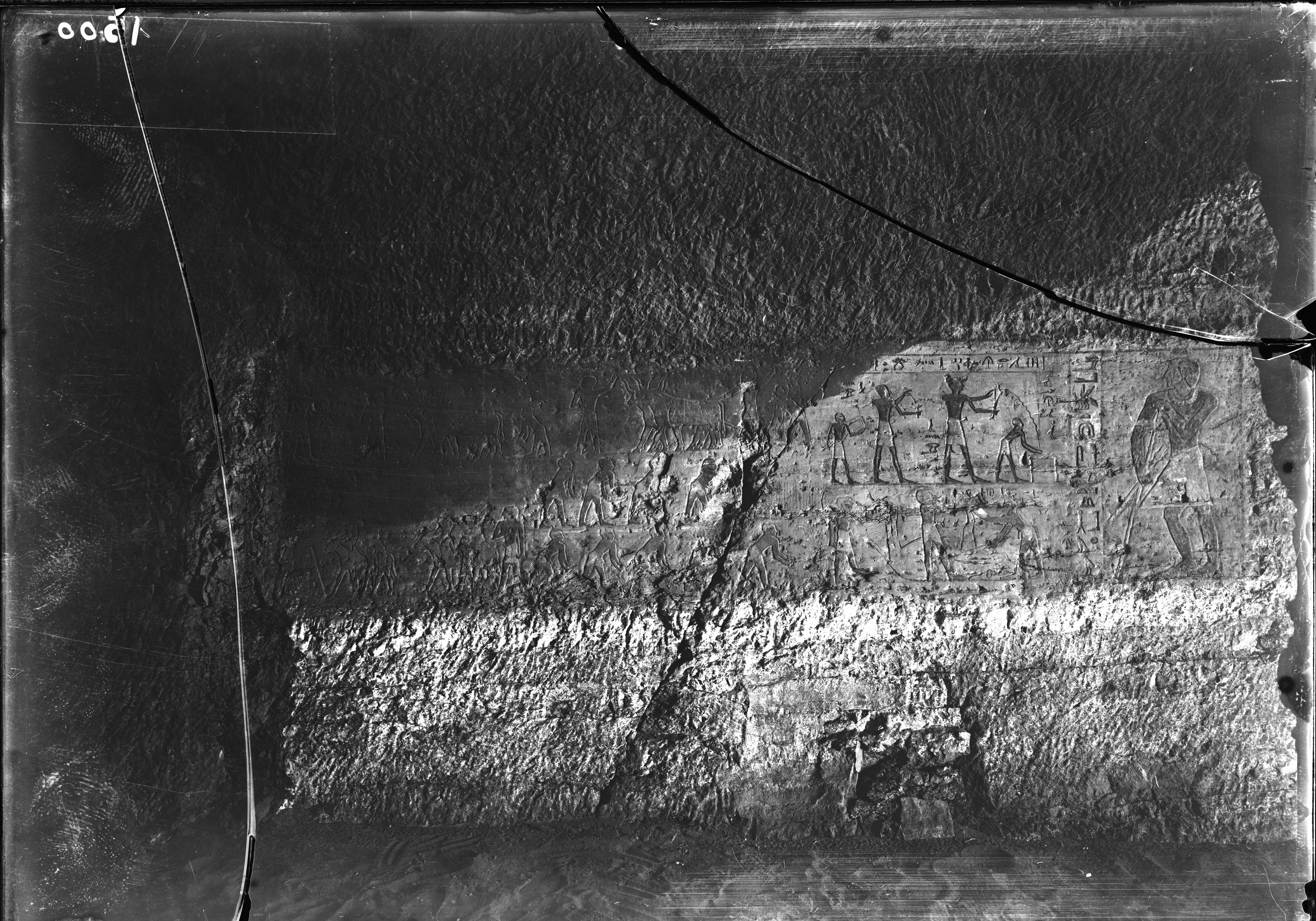
Wall of tomb QH25 of Mekhu, 1914

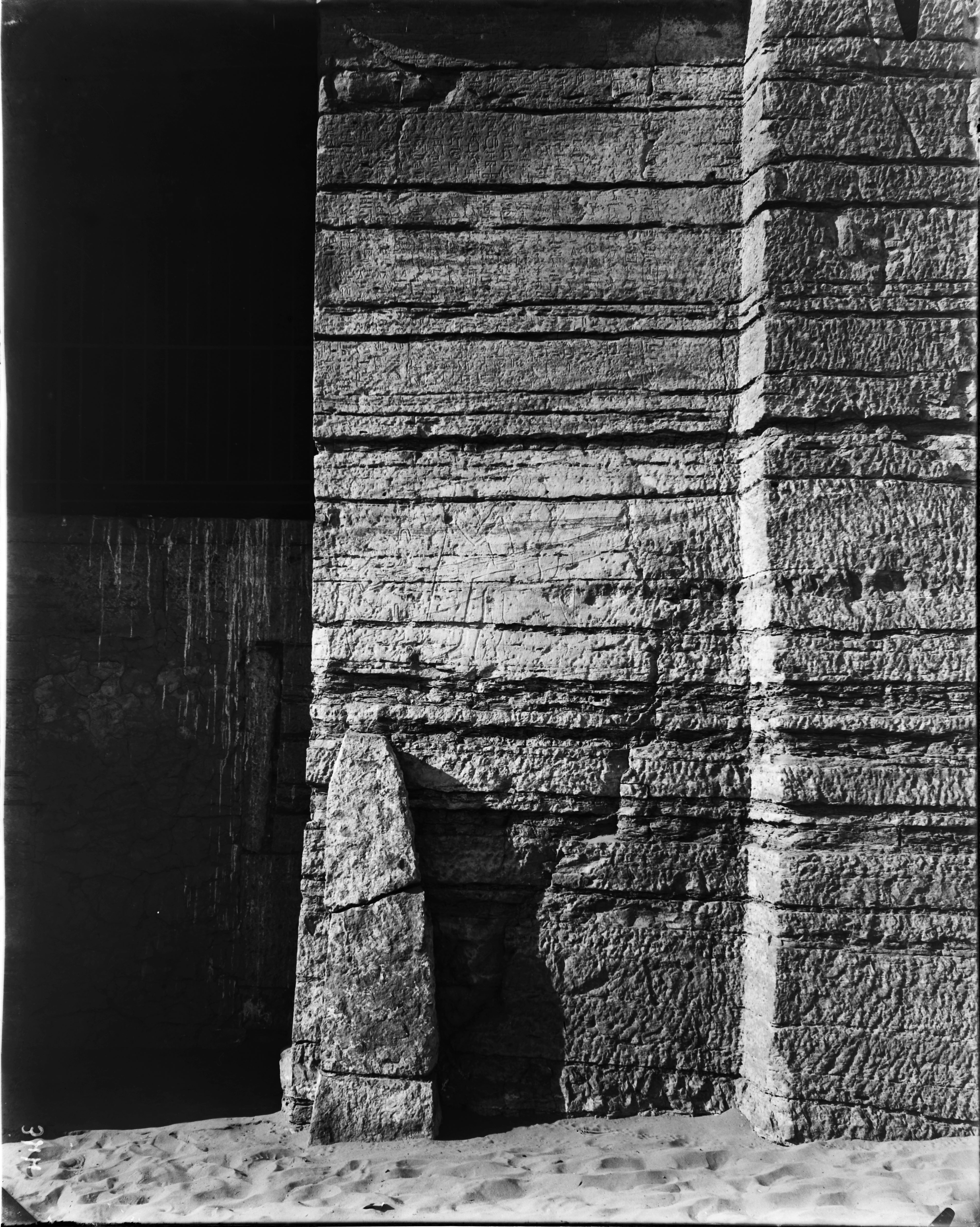
Entrance to tomb QH26 of Sabni I, 1914

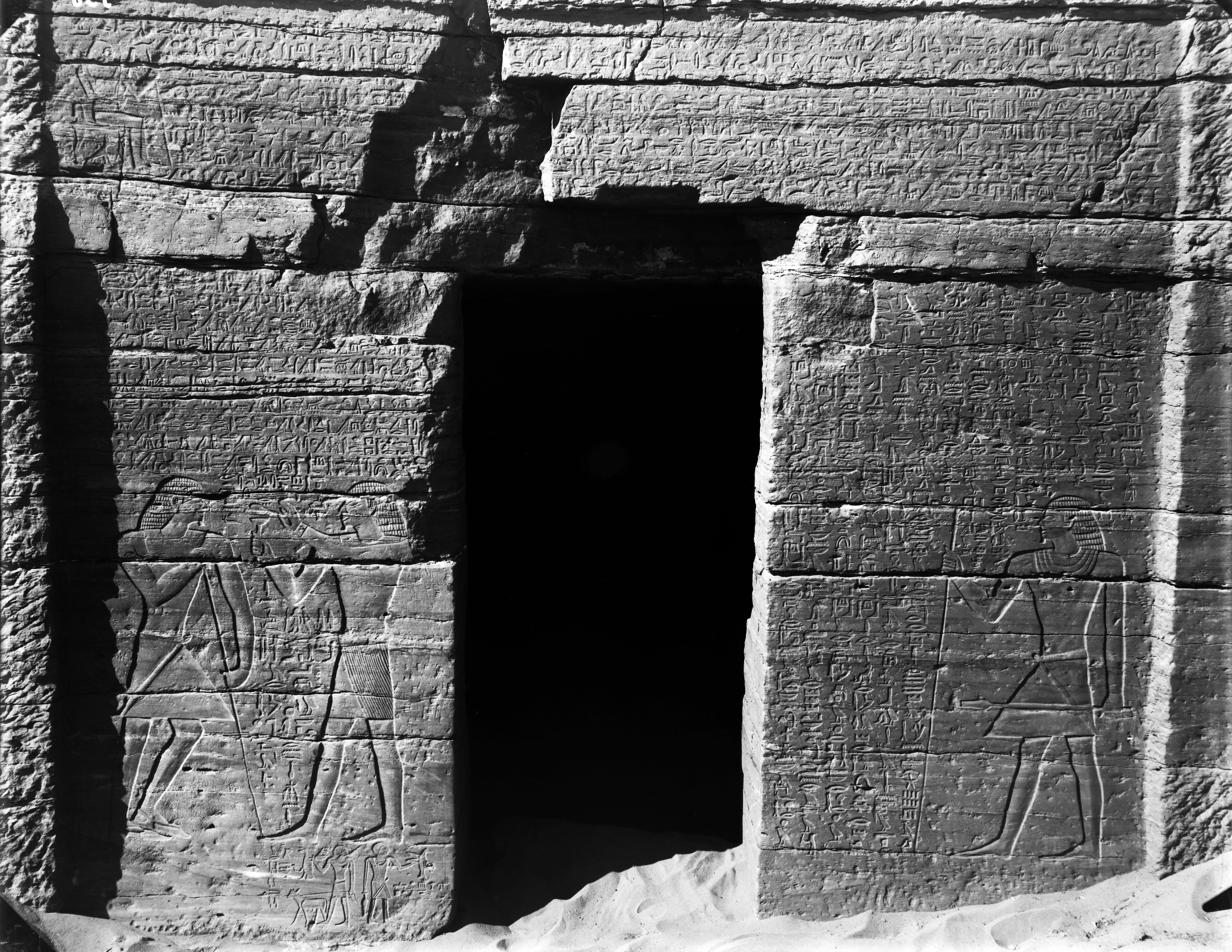
Tomb QH34n of Harkhuf, 1914

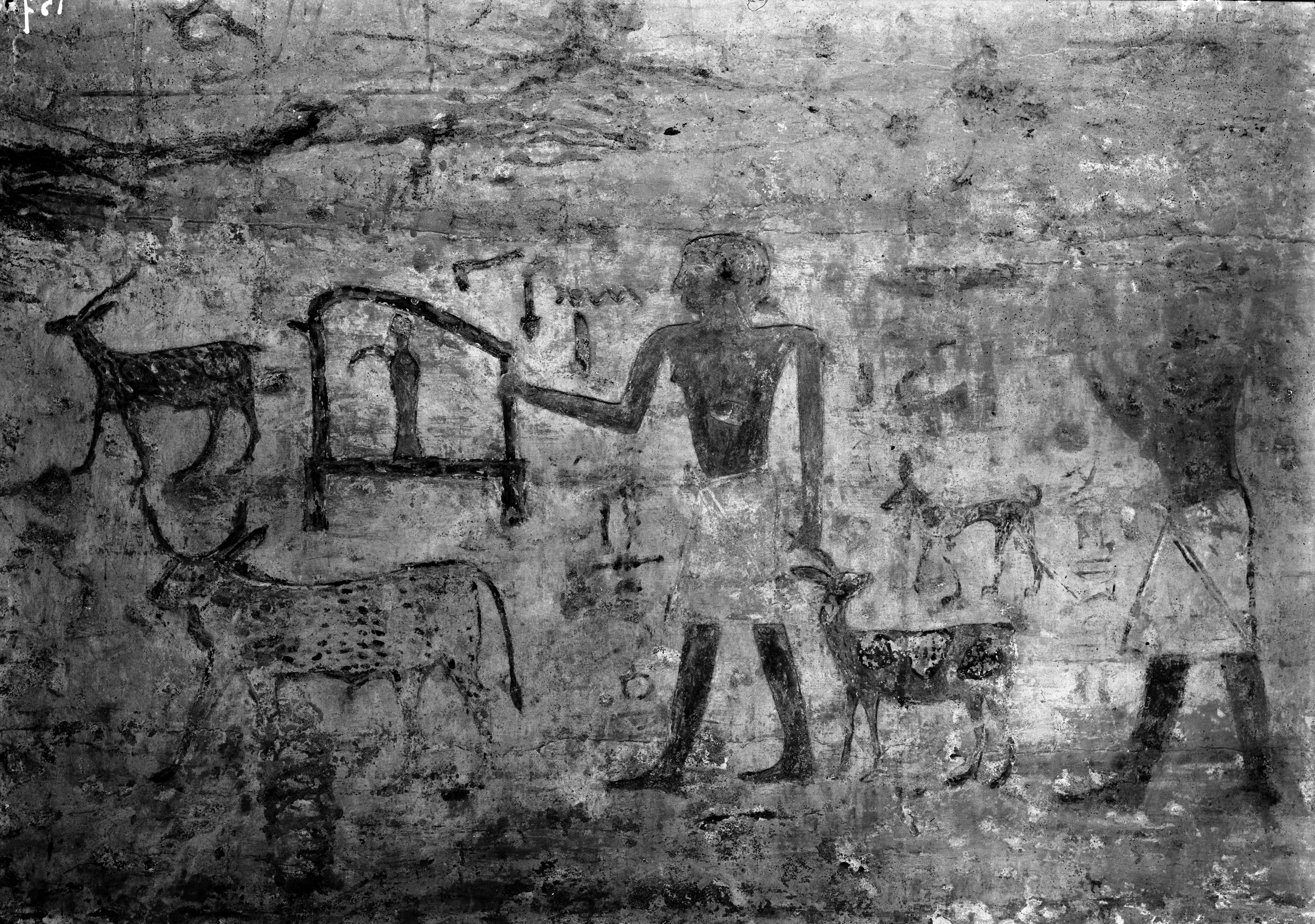
Wall scene in tomb QH35d, 1914

=== First Intermediate Period ===
The tomb of a chanting priest named Setka (QH 110; aka Setikai) from the First Intermediate Period

=== Middle Kingdom ===
During the Middle Kingdom, a minor sanctuary for one (or more) of these leaders (designated with the appellation "Heqa-jb") was prominent in the town at Elephantine.

- Sarenput I (QH 36) contemporary with king Senusret I.
- Heqaib, Son of Penidebu (QH 28) contemporary with king Senusret I.
- Sarenput II (QH 31) contemporary with kings Amenemhat II and Senusret II.
- Heqaib, Son of Sithathor (QH 30) contemporary with kings Senusret III and Amenemhat III.
Middle Kingdom tombs documented by the Museo Egizio photographic archive

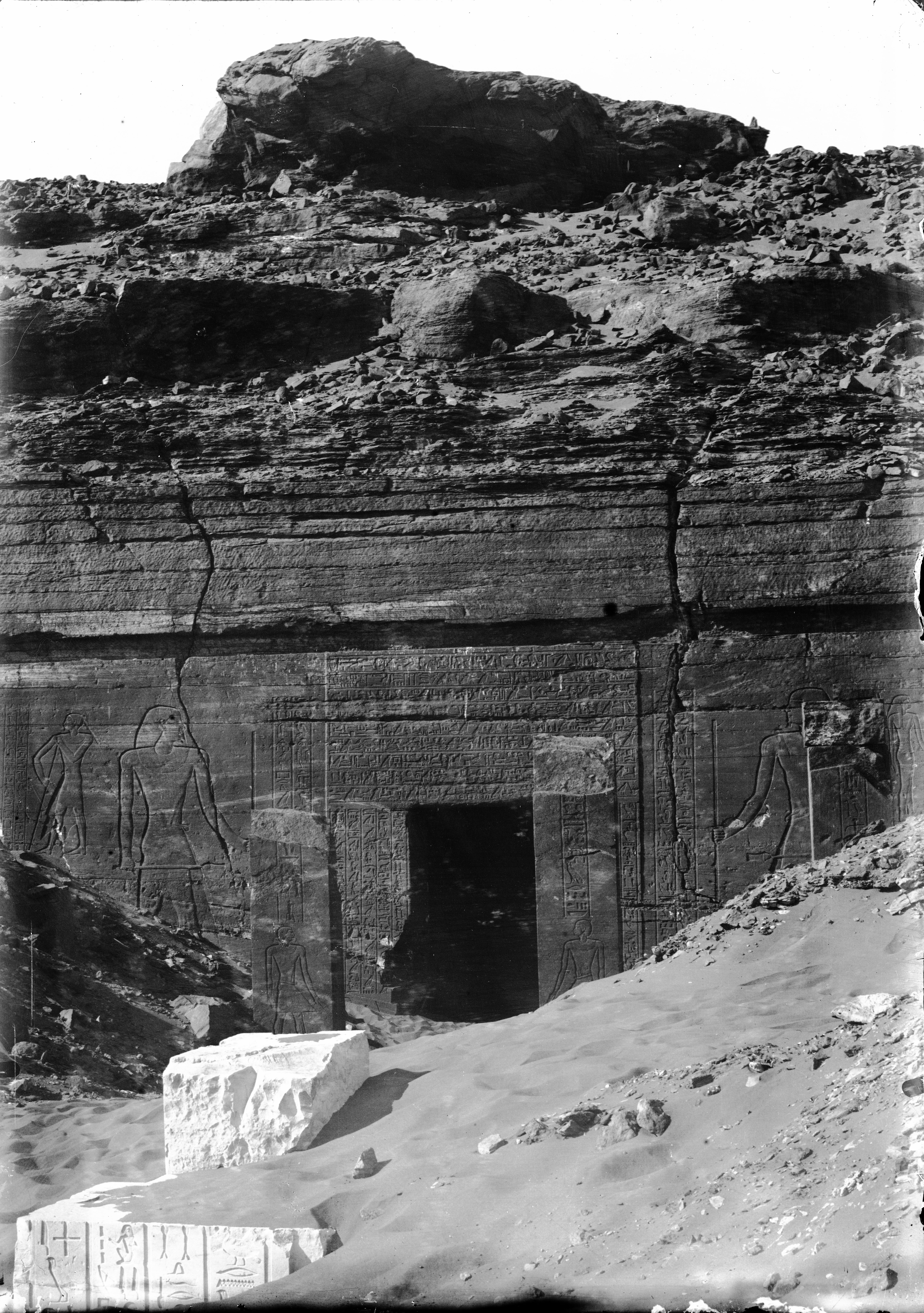
Entrance to Tomb QH31 of Sarenput II, 1914

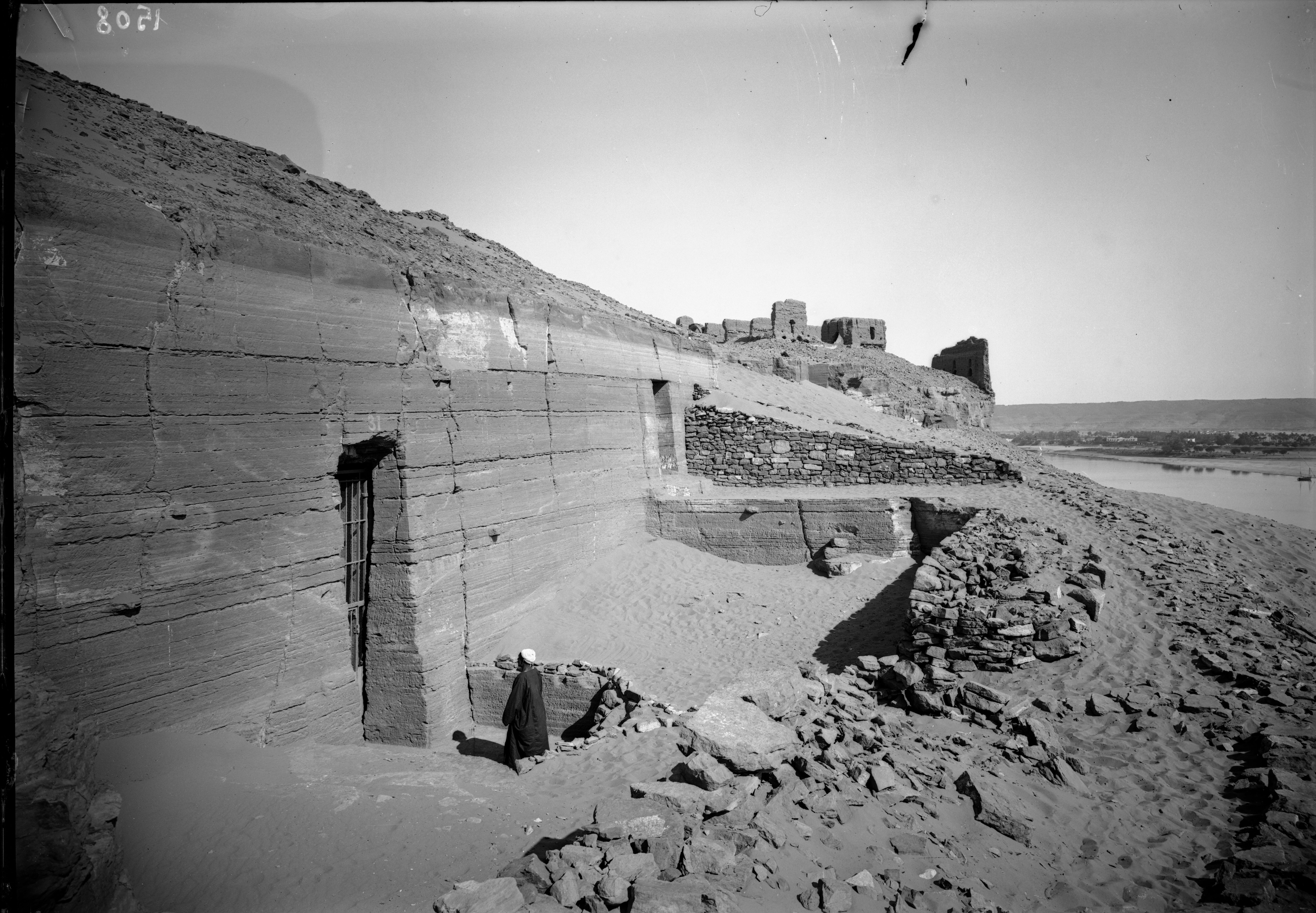
Entrance to Tomb QH31 of Sarenput II, 1914

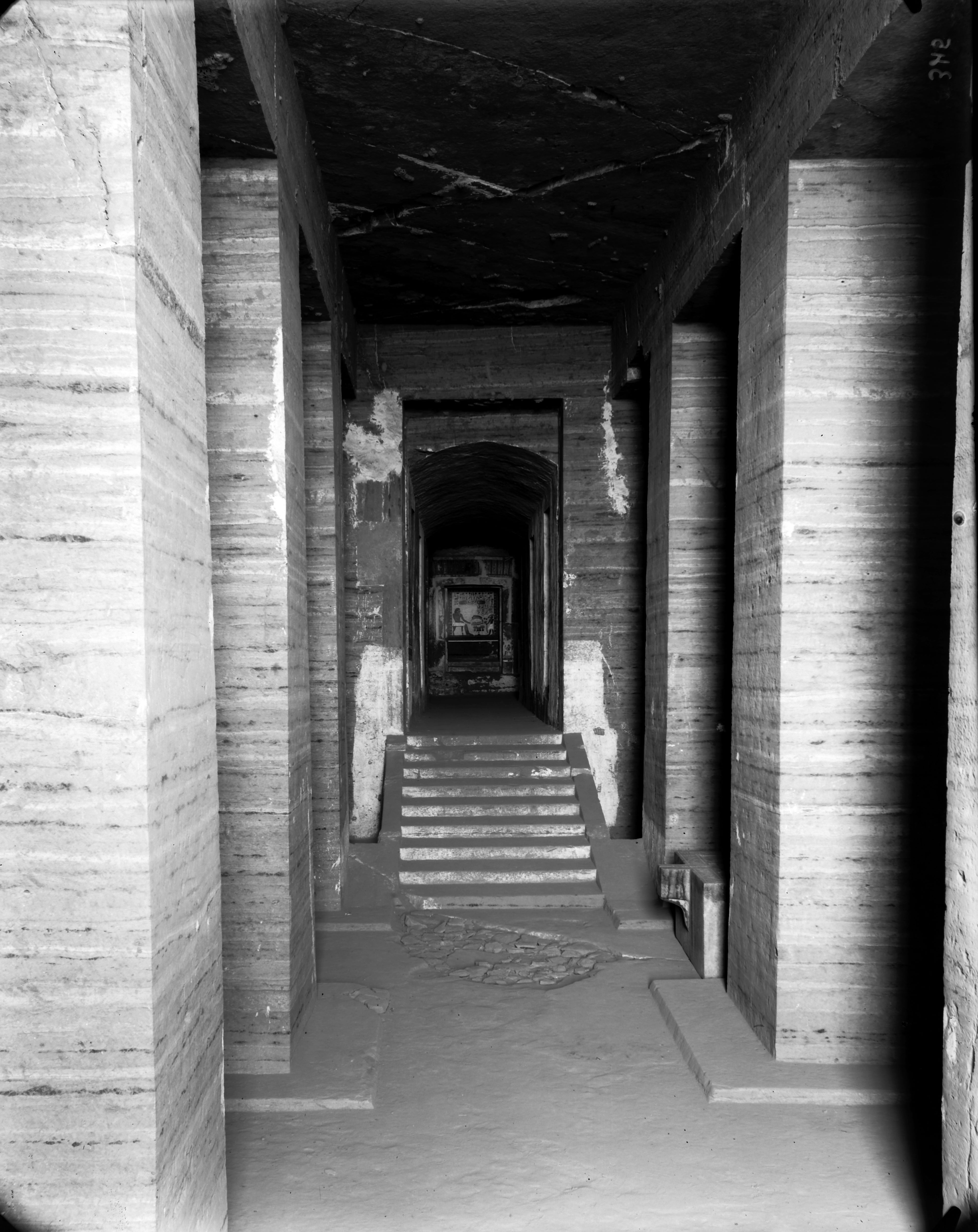
Interior of tomb QH31, 1914

=== New Kingdom ===
The tomb of a New Kingdom high priest named Kakm, the tomb of User Wadjat a New Kingdom-era ruler of Elephantine, and the tomb of Amenhotep a New Kingdom-era high priest and bearer of the seals of Upper Egypt.

=== Archaeology ===
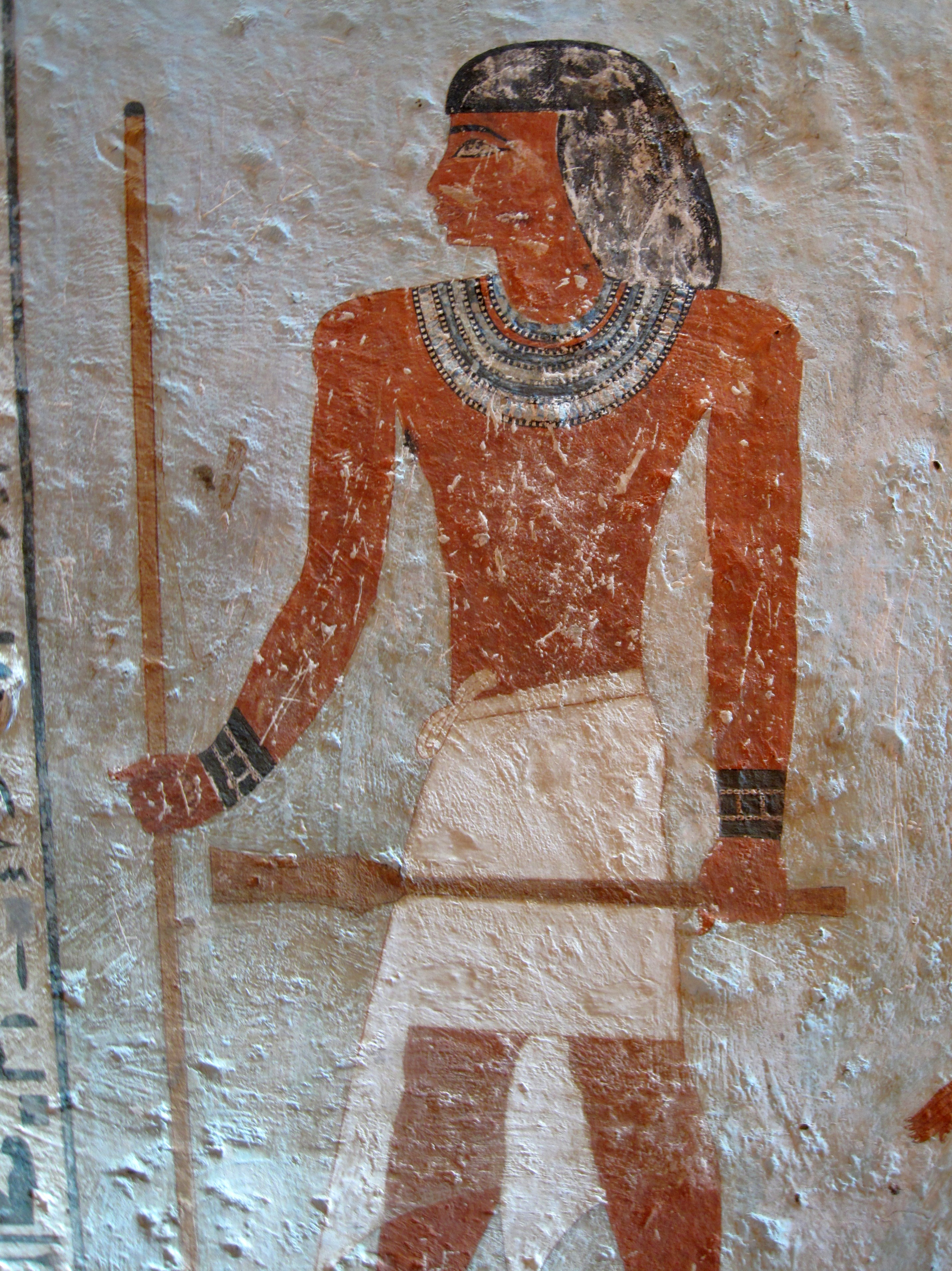
Wall painting of the Tomb of Sarenput II

Early excavators of the site included General Francis Grenfell in 1885, Ernesto Schiaparelli in 1892, Jacques de Morgan in the early 1890s and Lady William Cecil together with Howard Carter in the early 1900s. Labib Habachi worked at the site between 1946 and 1952. In more recent times Elmar Edel excavated at Qubbet el-Hawa between 1959 and the early 1980.

In 2008 excavation, by the University of Jaén, resumed at the site. In 2015 a joint effort of the University of Birmingham and the Egypt Exploration Society worked the site, focusing mainly on the Lower Necropolis.

Excavations of the Italian Archaeological Mission at Qubbet el-Hawa, 1914

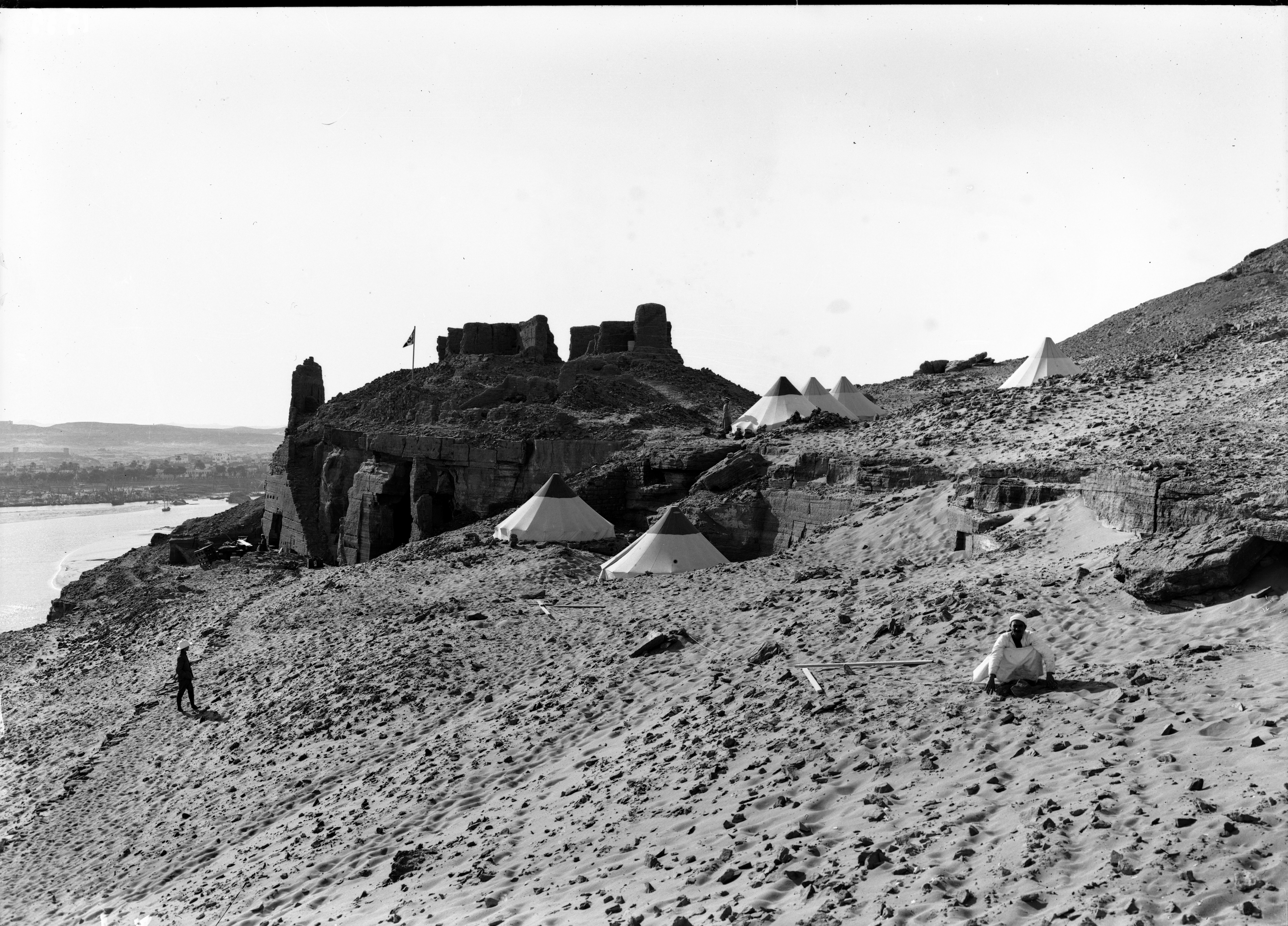
Camp of the Italian Archaeological Mission, 1914

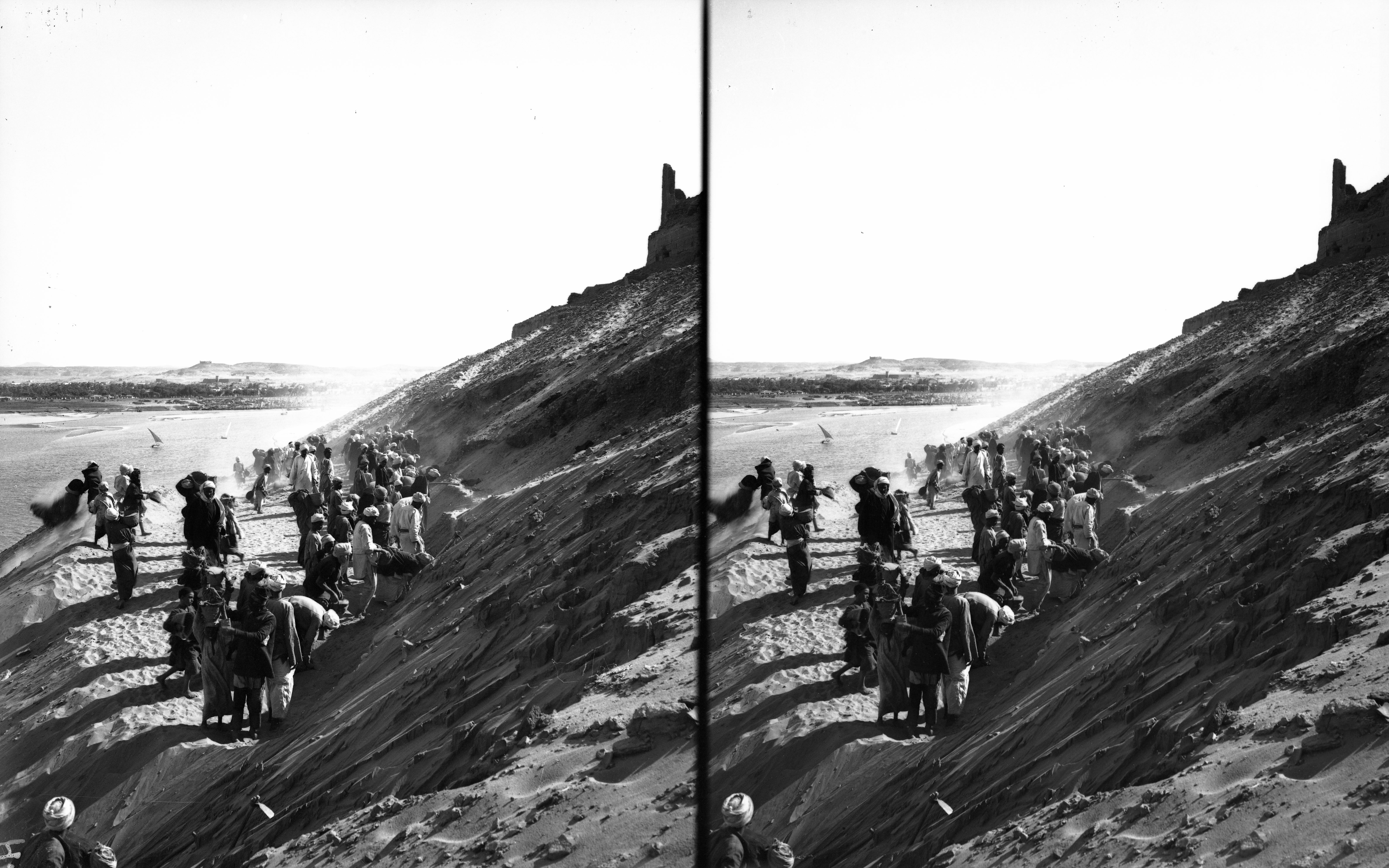
Excavation of the rock-cut tombs, 1914

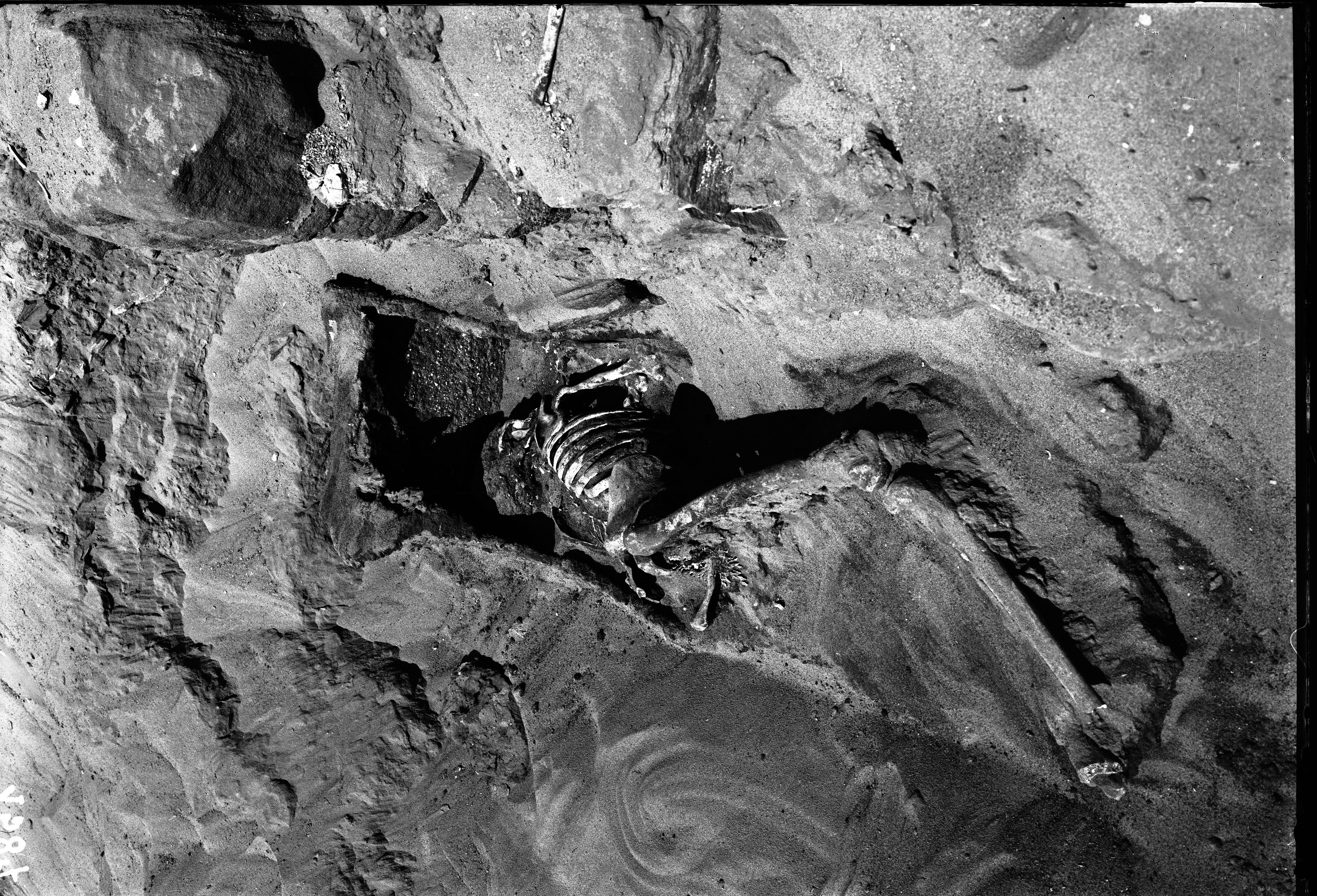
Burial with wooden coffin, 1914

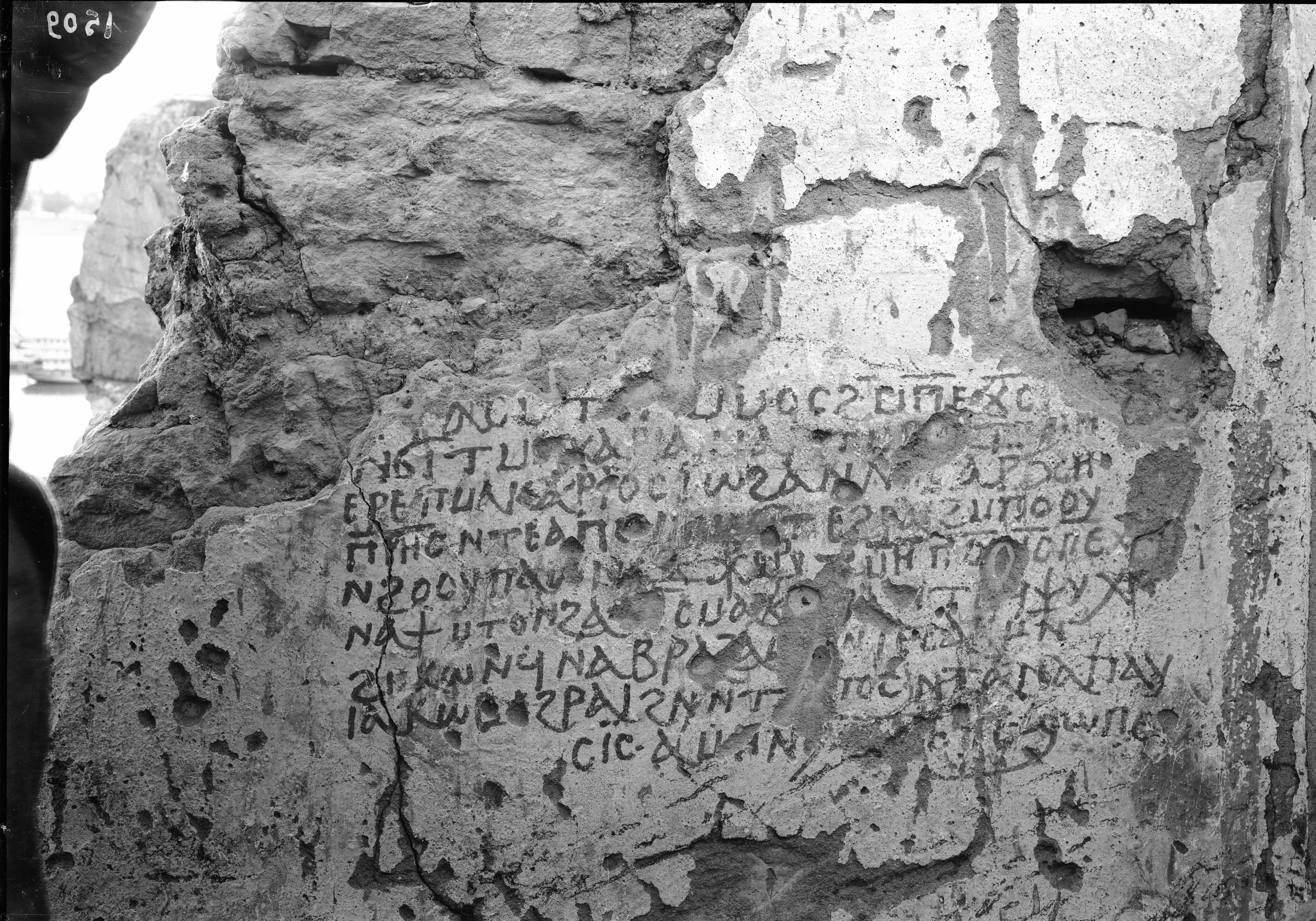
Coptic inscription at Qubbet el-Hawa, 1914

In 2019, 10 crocodile mummies ranging from 1.8 to 3.5 metres (5.9 to 11.5 ft) in length were uncovered in undisturbed burial chambers beneath a Byzantine-era dump. The finds consisted of more or less five fully intact bodies and five heads in various degrees of preservation. The crocodiles were speculated to have been dead for over 2,500 years and to have belonged to two different species, Crocodylus suchus and Crocodylus niloticus. The mummies contained no resin and any linen bandages used in the mummification had been lost due to insect deterioration, allowing the researchers to conduct a thorough morphological and osteometric description of the remains.

In January 2020, six mastaba graves, two shaft graves and one rock-cut tomb with several burials dating back to the Old Kingdom were uncovered by Qubbet El-Hawa Research Project led by Martin Bommas. Mostafa Vaziri said that one of the tombs was very well preserved, he also added that some of the graves were 190x285cm, while others were 352x635cm. Though entrance of one of the tombs with a wall of carefully laid mudbricks had blocked by the tomb constructors, that specific grave had been looted by thieves who broke into the tomb through the back wall in ancient times.

Abdel Moneim Saeed, director-general of the Aswan and Nuba Antiquities Sector, revealed in July 2022 that work was underway by a joint Egyptian-German mission to prepare several tombs for public viewing. The roads leading to them will also be repaired and paved, guide signs will be posted, and a modern lighting system will be set up.

In June 2025, archaeologists announced the discovery of three Old Kingdom tombs. The tombs, dated to the late 6th Dynasty (circa 2300–2100 BCE), consist of vertical shafts, small courtyards, false doors, offering tables, and pottery vessels. Human remains were also recovered, with evidence suggesting that the tombs were later reused during the Middle Kingdom. Although some of the tombs lacked inscriptions, they still exhibited traditional burial architecture and customs, which, according to the archaeologists, may indicate that the individuals buried there had limited economic means.

== Coptic site ==
The hill is also the site of a Coptic monastery of Saint Anthony and some of the tombs were reused as a Coptic church.

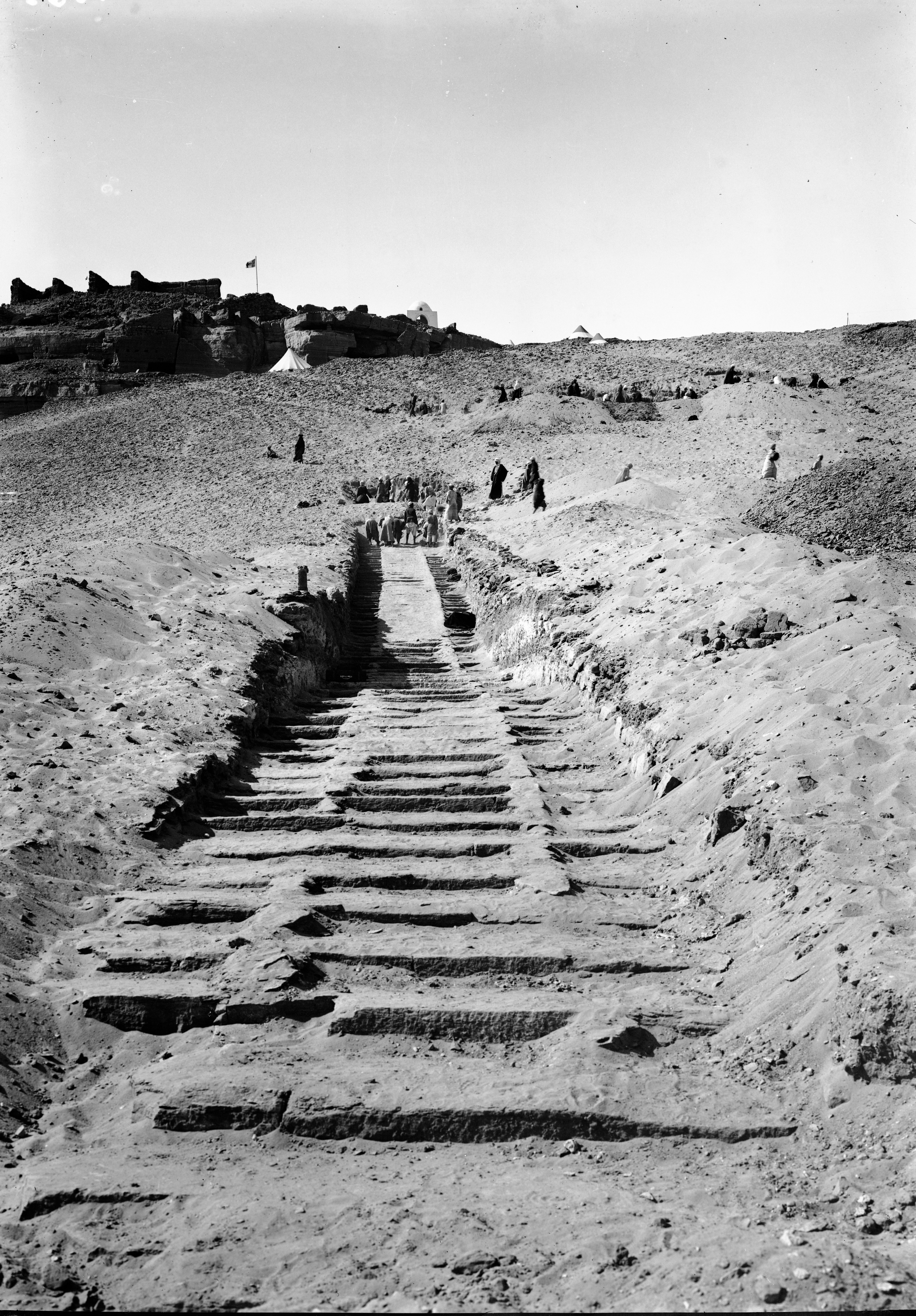
Tomb QH34h of Khunes, photograph from the Museo Egizio photographic archive, 1914

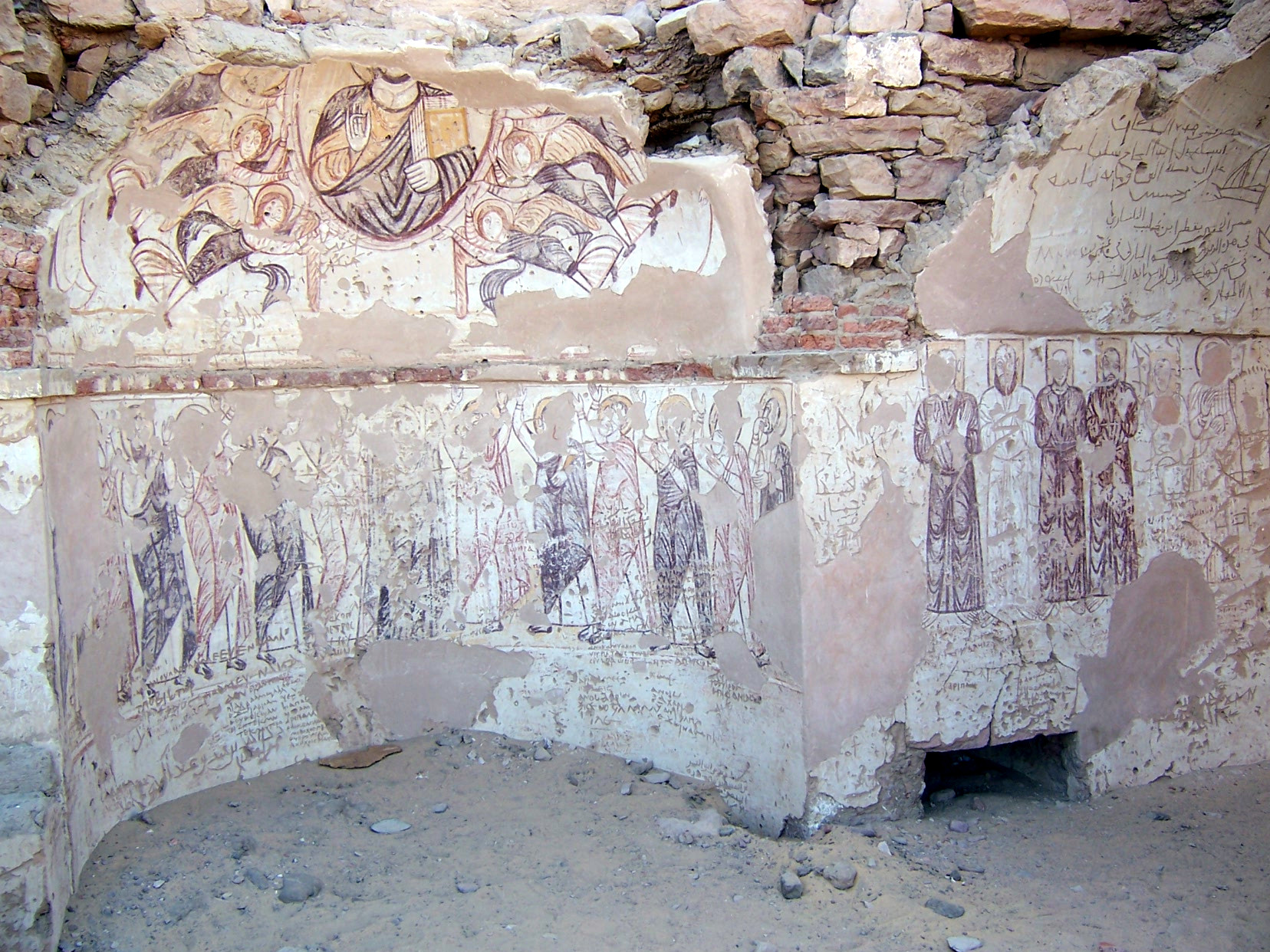
Coptic painting at Qubbet el-Hawa

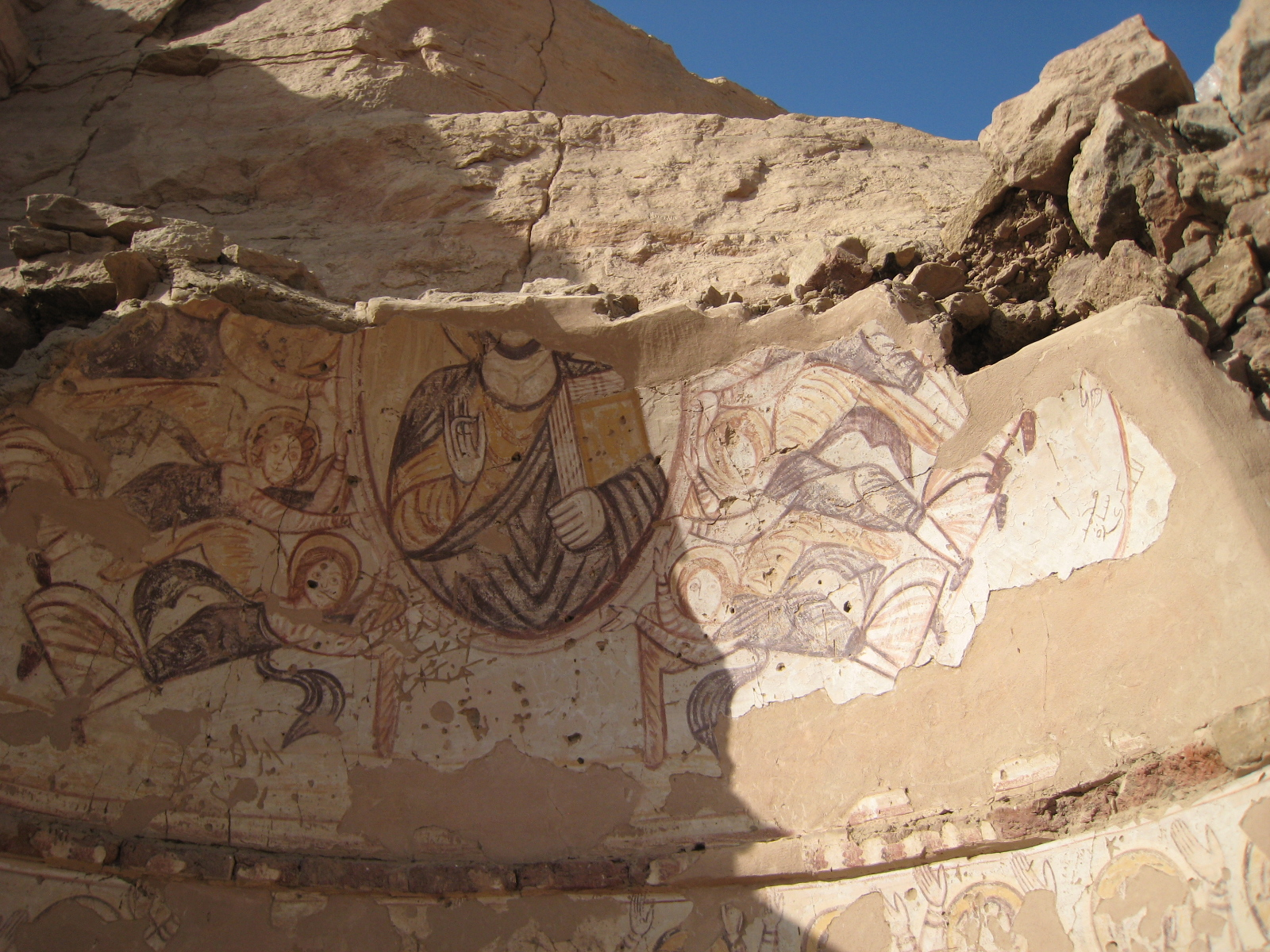
Coptic painting at Qubbet el-Hawa

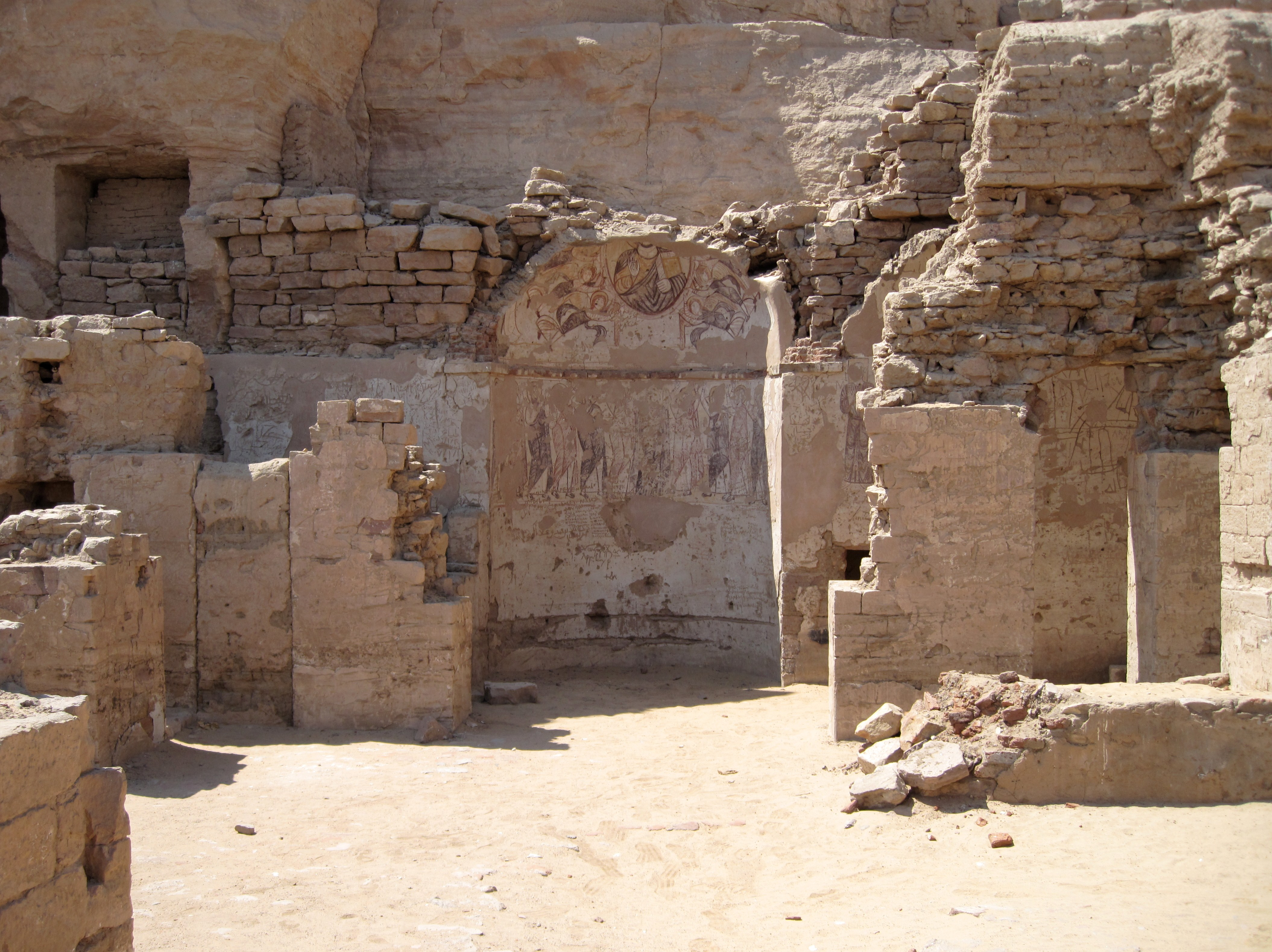
Coptic painting at Qubbet el-Hawa

== Bibliography ==
- Elmar Edel: Die Felsengräber der Qubbet el-Hawa bei Assuan. Wiesbaden 1967–1971.
- Elmar Edel: Die Reiseberichte des Harchuf (Hrw-hwff) in seinem Grab am Qubbet el-Hawa (34n). Berlin 1955.
- Elmar Edel: Beiträge zu den Inschriften des Mittleren Reiches in den Gräbern der Qubbet el-Hawa. Berlin 1971.
- Elmar Edel: Altägyptische Fürstengräber bei Assuan. Ausgrabungen auf der Qubbet el-Hawa. Berlin 1966.
- Alan Gardiner: Egypt of the Pharaohs. Oxford 1961.
- Labib Habachi: 16 Studies on lower Nubia. In: Annales du services des Antiquities de l'Egypte. (ASAE) Nr. 23, 1981.
- Labib Habachi: The Sanctuary of Heqaib. Mainz 1985.
- Michael Höveler-Müller: Funde aus dem Grab 88 der Qubbet el-Hawa bei Assuan. (Die Bonner Bestände), Wiesbaden 2006.
- M. R. Jenkins: Notes on the Tomb of Setka at Qubbett el-Hawa, Aswan. In: Bulletin of the Australian Center for Egyptology. (BACE) Bd. 11, Sydney 1999 S. 67–81.
- Jacques de Morgan: Catalogue des monuments et inscriptions de l'Egypte antique. Wien 1894.
- Hans Wolfgang Müller: Die Felsengräber der Fürsten von Elephantine aus der Zeit des Mittleren Reiches. Glückstadt 1940.
- Friedrich Wilhelm Rösing: Qubbet el-Hawa und Elephantine. Zur Bevölkerungsgeschichte von Ägypten. Fischer, Stuttgart/ New York 1990, ISBN 3-437-50325-1.
- Kurt Sethe, Urkunden des Alten Reiches. , Abteilung I, Band I, Heft 1–4, Leipzig 1932–3.
