= Irem (disambiguation) =

Irem may also refer to:

- Irem, a Japanese video game development company.
- Irem, an Ancient Nubian Kingdom
- İrem (name), female given name.
- Irem (construction company), a European building contractor
- Iram of the Pillars, a lost city in Arabia
- MV Karadeniz Powership İrem Sultan, a Liberia-flagged Turkish powership
- Institute of Real Estate Management, a business league headquartered in Chicago
