= Heqaib =

Egyptian nomarch

Pepinakht
- Nomarch of the 1st nome of Upper Egypt
Egyptian name
< p p i i > N35 M3 Aa1 X1PepinakhtS38 q G1 ib D58Heqaib
- Dynasty: 6th dynasty
- Pharaoh: Pepi II
- Burial: Aswan, Egypt
- Children: Sabni

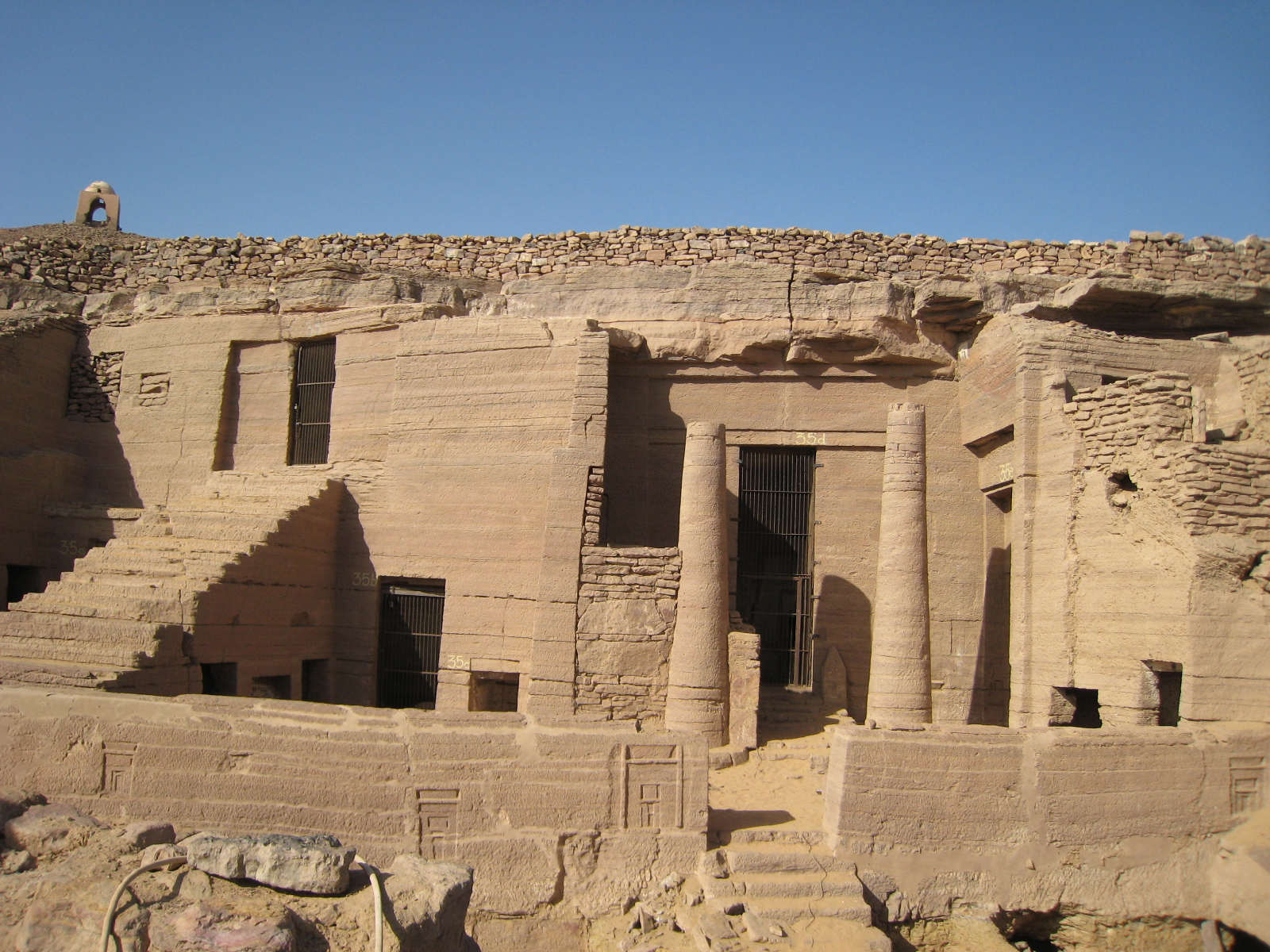
Entrance of the tomb of Heqaib at Qubbet el-Hawa

Pepinakht, nicknamed Heqaib, also Hekaib or Hekayeb (fl. c. 2250 BC), was an ancient Egyptian nomarch of the 1st Nome of Upper Egypt ("Land of the Bow") under king Pepi II, towards the end of the 6th Dynasty. He was also an officer in charge of military expeditions in Nubia.

Heqaib was posthumously deified for his military prowess.

== Career ==
Born Pepinakht (ppjj-nḫt - "[King] Pepi is strong"), he led at least three expeditions, which are all recorded on the façade of his tomb at Qubbet el-Hawa (near Aswan), after a long list of his titles.
In the first expedition, Pepinakht led a surprise attack in the lands of Wawat and Irthet, slaying many warriors and taking many prisoners to the court of the king. Then, he was sent back to the same places (second expedition) where he captured some chieftains, and also brought back booty. For his third expedition, Pepinakht was instructed to bring back the corpse of Enenkhet; he was an expedition leader in charge to build a ship to reach the Land of Punt, but he was attacked and killed along with his escort by the "sand dwellers". Pepinakht's autobiography abruptly ends while he was attacking the sand dwellers. However, it's very likely that he was able to accomplish even this mission.

His capabilities and charisma earned him the nickname Heqaib (ḥqꜣ-jb - "He who controls his heart") and then, after his death, a quick apotheosis. This fact may be representative of the great power achieved by local authorities in this period, which is a prelude to the forthcoming collapse of the Egyptian state. His son, named Sabni, apparently succeeded him in his charges. In a room in an official building on Elephantine were found several wooden boxes with names of local officials. One box bears the name of Heqaib. These boxes were most likely used in rituals around the funerary cult of the people mentioned on them.

== Legacy ==
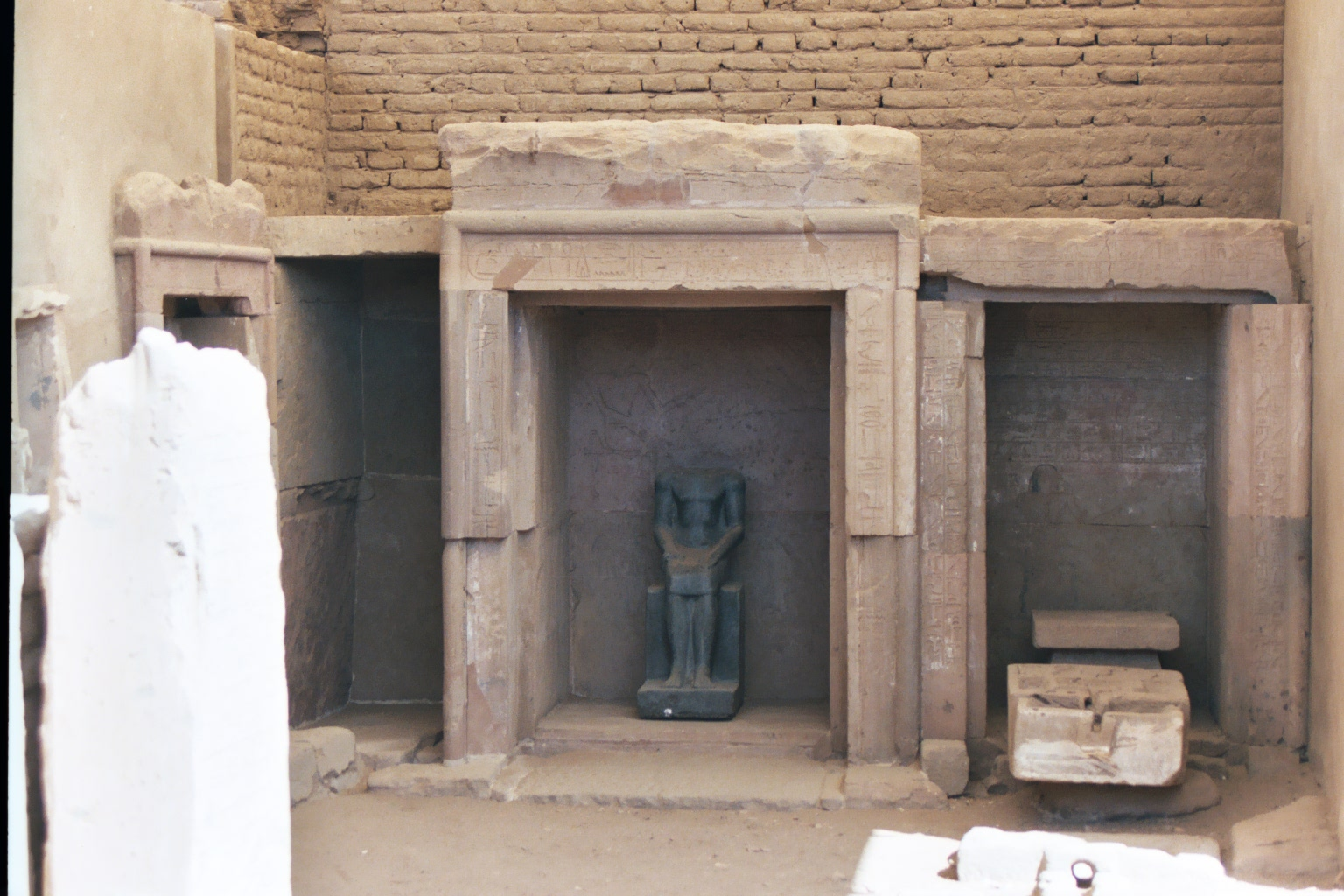
Shrines dating to the reign of Senusret I in the sanctuary of Heqaib

Shortly after Heqaib's death and divinization, a great number of people started to worship this "local saint" initially in front of his tomb at Qubbet el-Hawa, and later in a purpose-built sanctuary. From the various documents left by those devotees it is known that many of them were named "Heqaib" in his honour, and even some pharaohs are known to have left dedications in the sanctuary: among the royal statues found here can be mentioned those of Mentuhotep I (although posthumous), Intef II, Senusret III, Sekhemkare Amenemhat V, Neferhotep I, and Sekhemre-Wadjkhaw Sobekemsaf I, while it is known that Intef III ordered a restoration of the sanctuary during the early 11th Dynasty.

Heqaib's distant successors during the Middle Kingdom such as Sarenput I, Sarenput II and Heqaib III, expanded the sanctuary by building shrines dedicated to him and to themselves. However, with the advent of the troubled Second Intermediate Period the sanctuary was progressively abandoned and filled with debris, until its rediscovery by Edouard Ghazouli in 1932 and the subsequent excavations by himself and Labib Habachi.
