= Sarenput =

Sarenput is name of two people from Ancient Egypt

- Sarenput I was an ancient Egyptian official during the reign of pharaoh Senusret I of the 12th Dynasty.
- Sarenput II, also called Nubkaurenakht (Nbw-kȝw-rˁ-nḫt, "Strong is Nubkaure", i.e. Amenemhat II) was an ancient Egyptian nomarch during the reign of pharaohs Senusret II and Senusret III of the 12th Dynasty.
