= İrem (name) =

İrem is a feminine Turkish given name. In Turkish, "İrem" means "paradise garden".

== People ==
=== Given name ===
- Beyza İrem Türkoğlu (born 1997), Turkish handball player
- İrem Altuğ (born 1982), Turkish actress
- İrem Damla Şahin (born 2000), Turkish women's footballer
- İrem Derici (born 1987), Turkish singer
- İrem Dursun (born 2005), Turkishcross-country skier
- İrem Karamete (born 1993), Turkish Olympic fencer
- İrem Korkmaz (born 1998), Turkish judoka
- İrem Sak (born 1986), Turkish actress
- Irem Y. Tumer, American mechanical engineer
- İrem Yaman (born 1995), Turkish taekwondo practitioner

=== Surname ===
- İlhan İrem (1955-2022), Turkish singer-songwriter

== See also ==
- Iram of the Pillars (lost city)
- Erum (name)
