= Tümer =

Tümer is a Turkish male given name and surname. Notable people with the name include:

- Irem Y. Tumer, American mechanical engineer
- Tümer Metin (born 1974), Turkish footballer
- Nejat Tümer, Turkish admiral
- Murat Tümer, one of the founders of the Turkish rock band Mavi Sakal
