= Yam (Nubia) =

Ancient Kingdom in Nubia, Sudan

Map of Nubia with possible locations of Yam

The Land of Yam (Ancient Egyptian: yʾm) was an ancient kingdom in Upper Nubia (Kush) corresponding with the reign of Merenre Nemtyemsaf I in the 23rd Century BC, primarily known from the autobiography of Harkhuf.

== History ==
The land of Yam flourished between 2300 BC and 2201 BC (the 23rd Century) although the exact dates of the Kingdom are not fully known. In the mid-to-late 23rd Century BC the governor of southern Egypt Harkhuf was the first official to make the seven-month journey to Yam and back. When he returned he brought back:

“300 donkeys laden with incense, ebony, oil, aromatics, panther skins, ivory carvings and all good products”

Harkhuf made three journeys to Yam, on his final journey Harkhuf helped the King of Yam pacify the nearby state of Temeh (ṯmḥ). Harkhuf described Yam as the strongest state in Nubia, with a large army which caused the smaller states of Irjet/Irthet (jrṯt) , Sethu (sṯw) (Sethu most likely meaning “Ta-Seti”) and Wawat to submit and give gifts to both Yam and Harkhuf.

The next mention of Yam was in the reign of Mentuhotep II, some 300 years later. An inscription discovered in 2007 at Gabal El Uweinat mentioned the land of Yam.

== Proposed locations ==
The modern location of Yam is unknown but it was south of the kingdom of Kush, placing it deep within Sudan. Some scholars have associated Yam with the land of Irem, although this hasn't been definitively proven. Others believe that Yam was around modern day Darfur, due to the inscription found at Gabal El Uweinat, (a mountain range between Libya, Sudan and Egypt), which mentions the Land of Yam, Gabal El Uweinat being a stopping point for traders before continuing south to Yam. Most agree that Yam was southwest of Egypt, in modern-day Sudan. Kerma has also been suggested as a possible location of Yam.
