= Wawat =

Ancient land in Sudan

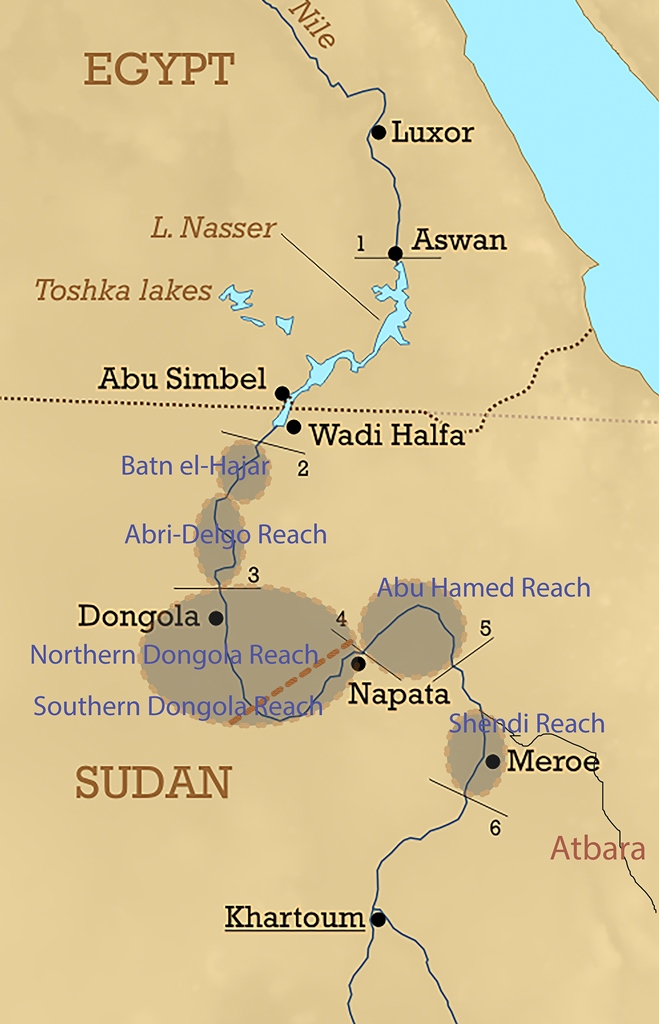
NileCataractReaches

Wawat (Ancient Egyptian: wꜣwꜣt) was the ancient Egyptian name for a region of Lower Nubia, extending roughly from the First Cataract near Elephantine to just north of the Second Cataract (in the area now submerged beneath Lake Nasser).

Like regions farther south, Wawat was inhabited by Kushite peoples archaeologically represented by the C-Group culture (c. 2400–1550 BCE), during the Old and Middle Kingdoms. Egyptian texts often referred to these populations collectively as Neḥesy (“southerners”). Wawat played a significant political and military role in Egyptian history, particularly as a frontier zone during periods of state expansion, diplomacy, and trade into inner Africa.

== Name and etymology ==
The name Wawat first appears in Egyptian texts during the Old Kingdom (c. 24th century BCE), often alongside other Kushite regions such as Irtjet and Yam. The official Weni for instance describes assembling armies against “the Irthet (jrṯt), Mazoi (mḏꜣ), Yam (jꜣm/jmꜣm), Wawat (wꜣwꜣt), and Kaau (kꜣꜣw) negroes”—each named individually but presented collectively. The term may have originally referred to an ethnolinguistic group or confederation inhabiting the Nile Valley between the cataracts. The etymology of the name remains uncertain, but it consistently designated a geographic and cultural zone just south of Egypt proper.

== Historical overview ==
=== Old Kingdom ===
In the late 3rd millennium BCE, Wawat was one of several polities active in Lower Nubia. Egyptian records from their Old Kingdom period, particularly during the reign of Pepi I (6th Dynasty, c. 2300–2200 BCE), refer to Wawat as part of a constellation of southern regions beyond the First Cataract. Inscriptions from officials such as Weni and Harkhuf describe both military and diplomatic missions into these territories. Wawat is listed alongside Irthet, Mazoi, Yam, and Kaau—named individually but collectively portrayed as autonomous foreign entities engaged in trade, diplomacy, and at times conflict with Egypt. During the Old Kingdom the kingdom of Yam enacted power over the other smaller Nubian states, including Wawat.

These same sources also note peaceful interactions: Weni records that chiefs from Wawat and neighboring regions supplied timber for shipbuilding. These ships were used to transport granite from Aswan for Pepi I’s pyramid complex, reflecting Wawat’s involvement in resource exchange along the Nile corridor.

=== Middle Kingdom ===
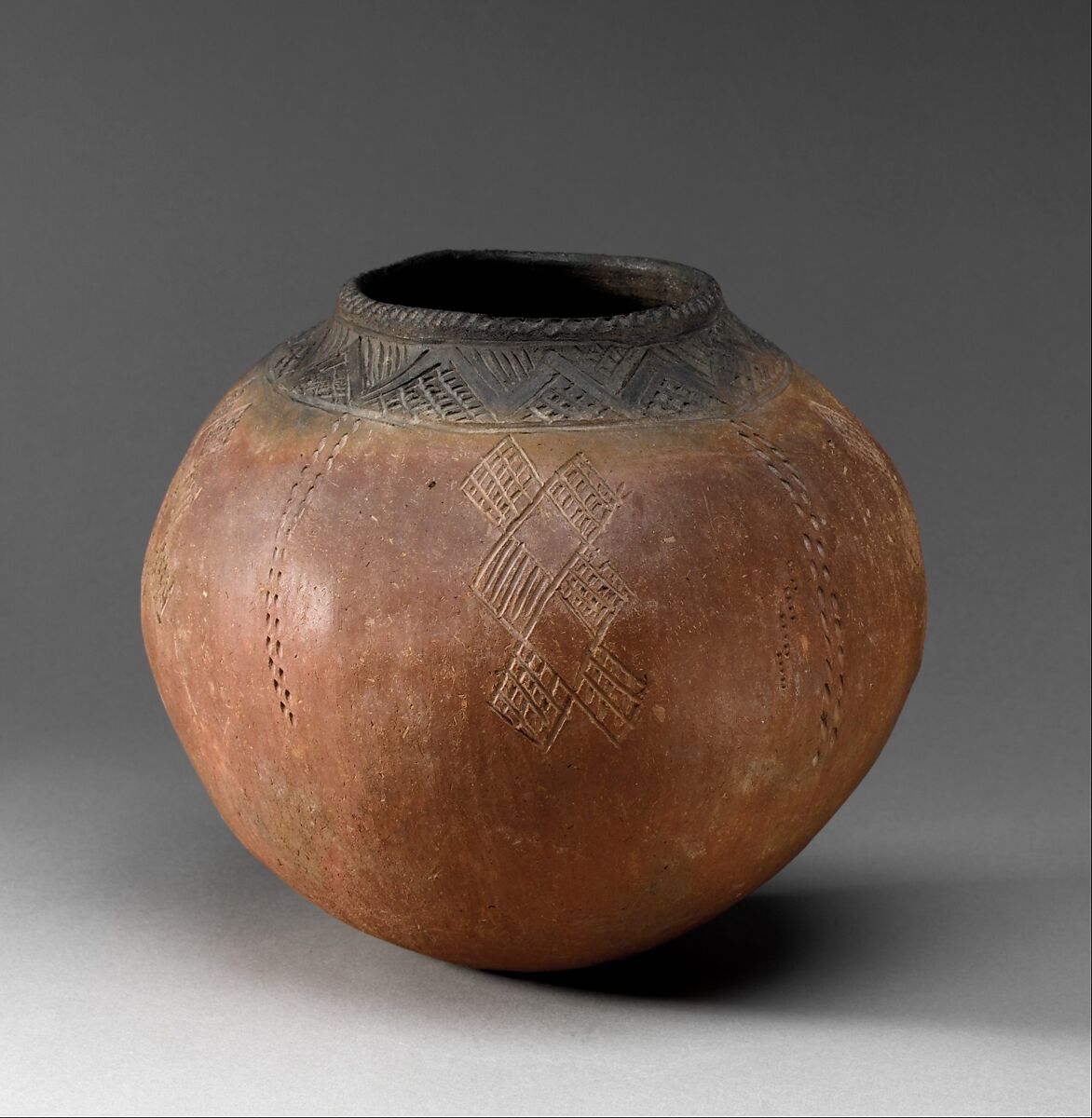
C-Group pottery is one of the most distinctive elements of their material culture. The pottery is characterized by intricate incised decorations, often depicting cattle and herding activities, underscoring the cultural and symbolic significance of livestock within their society.

During the 12th Dynasty (c. 1991–1802 BCE), Wawat became a focus of sustained Egyptian colonization. Pharaoh Senusret I and especially Senusret III launched military campaigns into Lower Nubia and established a line of fortresses at sites such as Buhen, Semna, and Uronarti. These measures were designed to protect Egypt’s southern border and control access to trade and gold resources. Administrative control of Wawat was often delegated to the “King’s Son of Kush,” a viceroy who managed Kushite affairs on behalf of the pharaoh. The viceroy was responsible for overseeing the area north of the Third Cataract, which was divided into Wawat in the north, centered at Aniba, and Kush in the south, centered at Soleb during the Eighteenth Dynasty of Egypt and later at Amara West. They were supported in this task by two deputies, a number of scribes, an overseer of cattle, and the priests of local Egyptian built temples.

During the reign of Senusret II (c. 1897–1878 BCE), Egyptian officials such as Hapu were dispatched to inspect the fortresses of Wawat. The Semna Stela of Senusret III (r. c. 1878–1839 BCE) later records the king’s efforts to fortify Egypt’s boundary beyond Wawat and prevent its inhabitants from entering Egyptian territory, except for trade purposes. The stela warns:

No Nehesy (southerner) shall cross it, by sailing north or by land, with a ship or any herds of the Nehesy

=== New Kingdom and decline ===
By the time of the New Kingdom (c. 1550 BCE), the term Wawat was gradually replaced in official inscriptions by the broader term Kush, which came to refer to Upper Nubia and the Egyptian-controlled territories further south. Nevertheless, Wawat remained an important sub-region under Egyptian administration and continued to be mentioned in texts related to temple estates, expeditions, and provincial governance.

== Geography and inhabitants ==
Wawat’s heartland lay in Lower Nubia. The region was characterized by Nile floodplain agriculture, and its inhabitants were primarily members of the C-Group culture. Egyptian texts consistently distinguish Wawat from neighboring regions such as Yam (further south) and Medja (to the east), though all are often collectively referred to as “the Neḥesy.”

== Legacy ==
Wawat is significant for understanding the early phases of Egypt’s contact with Nubia and the development of imperial administration. Its gradual absorption into Egyptian state structures during the Middle Kingdom marked a key phase in the expansion of Egyptian territorial power. The eventual replacement of the name Wawat with Kush in later periods reflects changing political boundaries and ethnographic conceptions in pharaonic ideology.
