= Heqaib III =

Ancient Egyptian Nomarch

- Nomarch in the 1st nome of Upper Egypt
Egyptian name
HqA q ib
- Successor: Amenyseneb
- Dynasty: 12th dynasty
- Pharaoh: Amenemhat III
- Burial: Qubbet el-Hawa
- Mother: Sat-tjeni

Heqaib III was an ancient Egyptian nomarch at Elephantine. He lived at the end of the 12th Dynasty around 1800 BC. He held the titles nomarch and overseer of priests of Khnum, lord of the cataracts.

Heqaib was the son of a woman called Sat-tjeni and was perhaps the brother of Amenyseneb who followed him in the office of the nomarch; both men have a woman named Sat-tjeni as mother. It has been suggested that Sat-tjeni was the daughter of a previous nomarch at Elephantine, Sarenput II.
Heqaib is mainly known from a statue dedicated by him to the local sanctuary of his distant predecessor Heqaib at Elephantine. The statue shows him kneeling with a vessel in each hand. His tomb was discovered in 2014 at Qubbet el-Hawa, with a painted coffin and the remains of a funerary mask.
