= Irem (Nubia) =

Ancient Kingdom/Land in Nubia, Sudan

Rough map of Irem with markers for the Shendi Reach and Atbarah

The Land of Irem (Irm) was a place mentioned in New Kingdom Ancient Egyptian records, it was located to the South of Egypt, possibly in the rough area of the Butana region, Shendi Reach and the Atbara river in Sudan, in-between the 5th and 6th cataracts of the Nile. Irem may have been the cultural successor to Yam, another Nubian state. In Egyptian records it is referred to as "God's Land", a general term for Southern Kingdoms. Irem bordered the other Ancient kingdom of Punt. Irem was the furthest extent of Egypt's interest in the Nile Valley.

== History ==
At Hatshepsut's temple of Deir el-Bahari it is mentioned that the chiefs of Irem and Nemiu brought gifts (in this case the gifts were specifically gifts and not tribute or tax) of gold rings and panther skins.

In the 34th year (c. 1445 BC) of Thutmose III's reign, the sons of the Chieftains of Irem were brought to Egypt (although other Nubian princes were mentioned as being brought due to military defeat, Irem's princes were not mentioned in this context and may have come peacefully or were political court hostages to continue Egyptian influence and indirect control of the region).

During the 8th year of Seti I's reign (either 1286 or 1282 BCE) there was a rebellion in the land of Irem in which 660 prisoners were taken by Egypt's expedition.

In the year 311 BCE, in the reign of Macedonian Pharaoh Alexander Aegus IV, Satrap Ptolemy Lagides (later Pharaoh Ptolemy I) wrote a stela known as the Ptolemy Stela, in which he mentions an expedition to Irem in which he states;

Afterwards, he made an expedition to the territory of Irem, seizing them in a single moment. In retaliation for what they had done against Egypt, he brought away their people, both male and female, together with their gods.

== Culture ==
The people of Irem spoke a Northern Eastern Sudanic Language, a variant of the Nilo-Saharan languages. The region contained rhinoceroses as well as giraffes.
