= Erum (name) =

Erum (Arabic: إرَم ʾIram, Persian: إرَم ʾEram) is a Muslim name meaning "Paradise" or "Heaven". It is variously romanised as Irum, Irim, Errum, and Eyrom.

In Persian folklore the name is used in the story of King Shaddad, who wanted to compete with God and said that he would create Bāgh-e Eram ("Heaven on Earth"). To create this garden he used up all his wealth and power, even stealing from the poor. He made it so beautiful that it was said to have fountains of wine and milk, and rocks made of the most precious gems that one could ever imagine. His cruelty is said to have upset God and God decided to punish him, so that he would never lay eyes on Erum. Just when Shaddad was about to enter the gates of Erum he tripped on the steps and died on the spot.

== Notable persons with this name ==
- Erum Ali (Indian fashion designer)
- Iram Haq (Pakistani-Norwegian actress)
- Iram Hassan Bajwa (Pakistani politician)

== See also ==
- Eram Garden (garden in Shiraz, Iran)
- Errum Manzil (palace in Hyderabad, India)
- Iram of the Pillars (lost city)
