= Sarenput II =

Egyptian nomarch

- Nomarch of the 1st nome of Upper Egypt
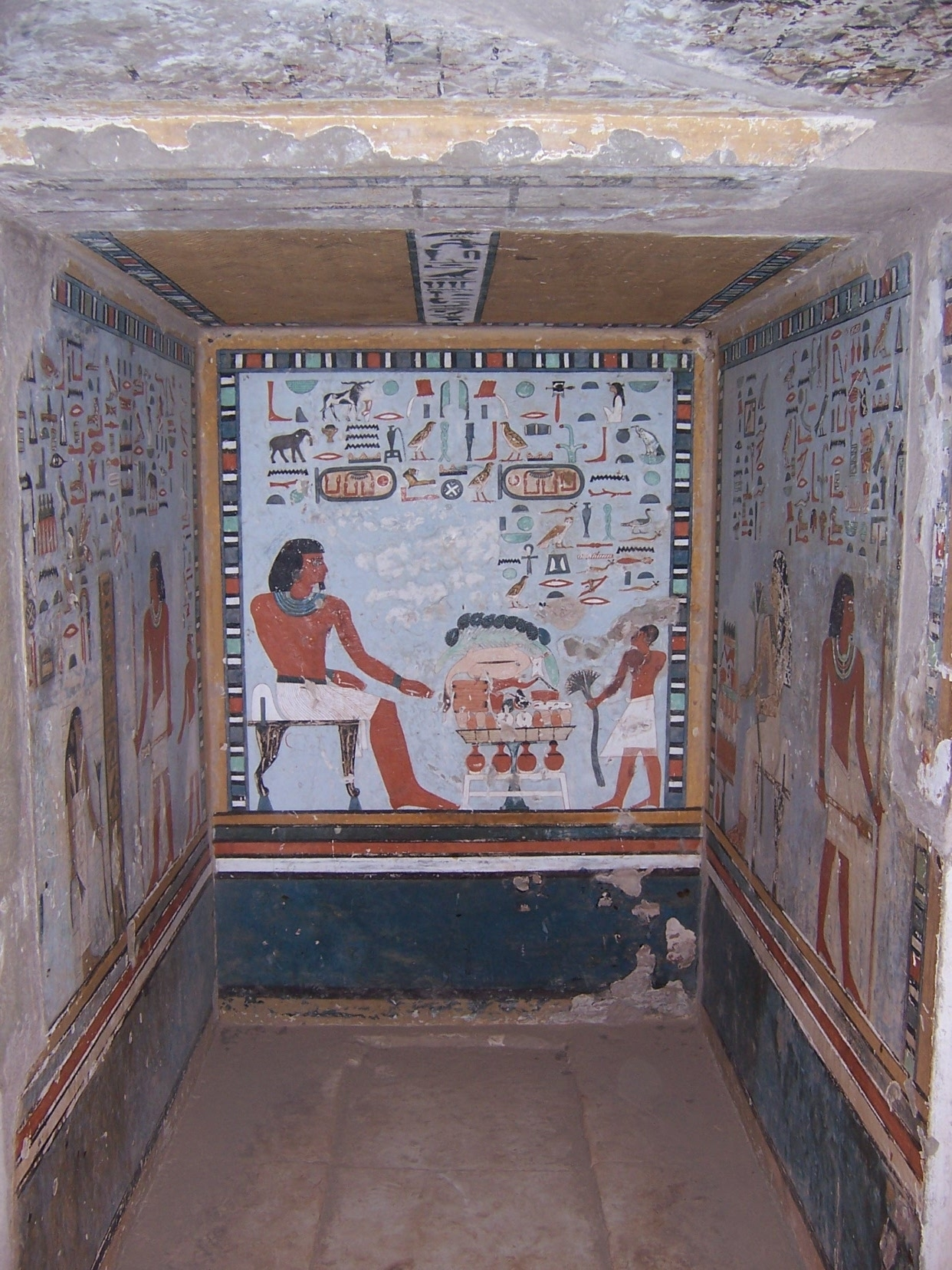
- Sarenput II on the painted niche in his tomb
Egyptian name
G39 r n p w t < ra S12 D28 D28 D28 > n M3 Aa1 X1Sarenput – Nubkaurenakht
Sȝ-rnpwt – Nbw-kȝw-rˁ-nḫt
- Dynasty: 12th Dynasty
- Pharaoh: Amenemhat II, Senusret II, Senusret III
- Burial: Qubbet el-Hawa, tomb 31
- Father: Khema
- Mother: Satethotep
- Children: Sattjeni

Sarenput II, also called Nubkaurenakht (Nbw-kȝw-rˁ-nḫt, "Strong is Nubkaure", i.e. Amenemhat II) was an ancient Egyptian nomarch during the reign of pharaohs Senusret II and Senusret III of the 12th Dynasty.

== Family ==
Sarenput II was the son of Khema, a governor of Elephantine during the reign of Amenemhat II, and of his wife Satethotep, as well as the nephew of the nomarch Sarenput I. Among his titles, he was nomarch of the 1st nome of Upper Egypt ("Land of the Bow"), mayor of Elephantine, high priest, overseer of the priests of Satet and Khnum, and "leader of the border patrols at the narrow door of the southern lands".

Sarenput II had a younger brother, Shemai, whose undisturbed burial was discovered in March 2017 by University of Jena in the Qubbet el-Hawa area of Aswan, the same area where Sarenput had his tomb. Shemai's mummy was found and covered with a "beautiful mask". Sarenput also had a daughter, Sattjeni, who has been identified as the mother of two subsequent nomarchs at Elephantine: Amenyseneb and Heqaib III.

== Career ==
He is attested as nomarch for at least 12 years between Year 4 of Senusret II and Year 8 of Senusret III.

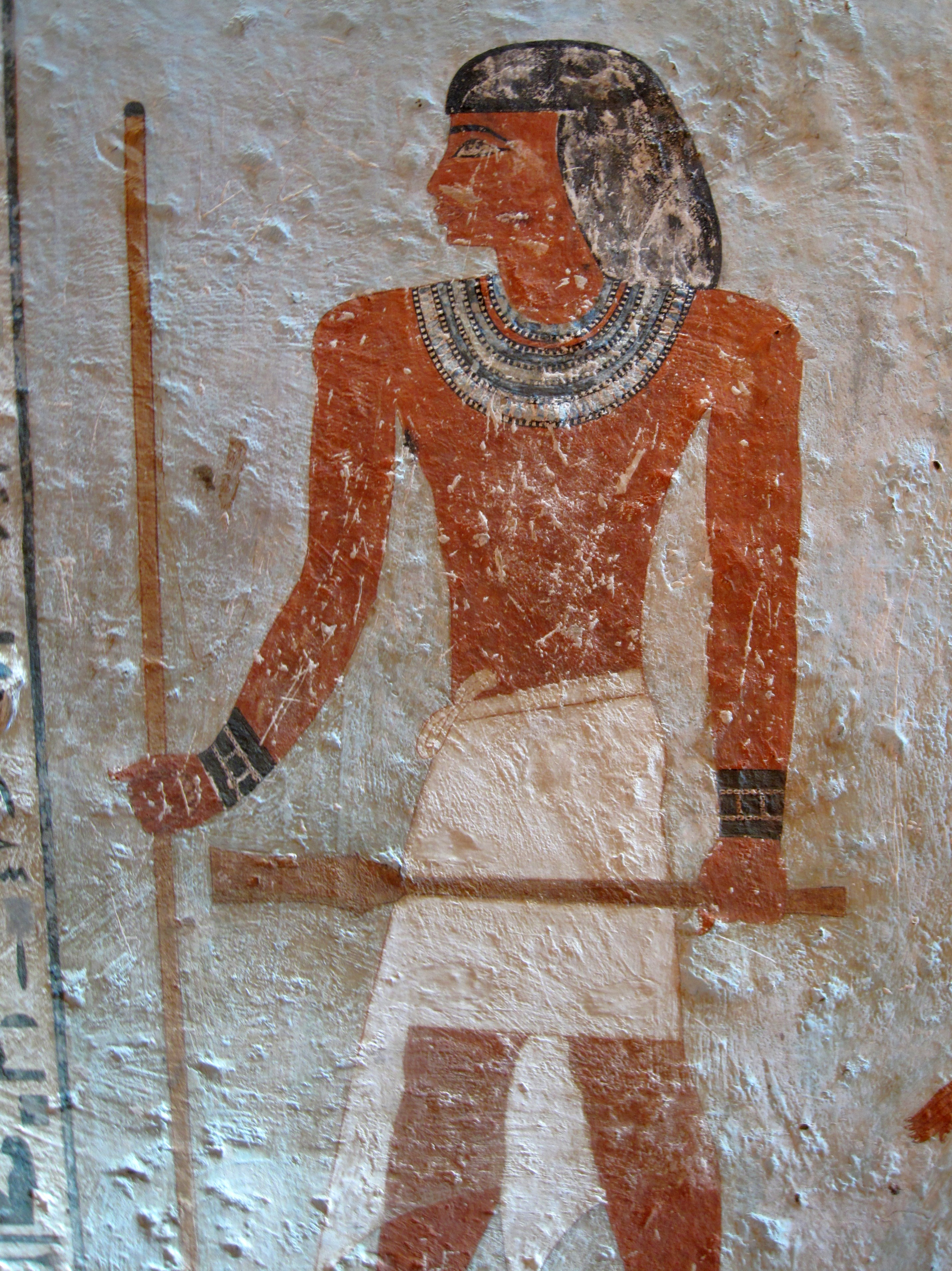
Relief of Sarenput II from his tomb.

Like many of his predecessors, Sarenput made additions at the sanctuary of Heqaib at Elephantine. He ordered a shrine for his father Khema and one for himself, containing a statue of Khema and one of Sarenput II respectively. The two statues are stylistically different, with the former (Khema) being idealized and typical of the reign of Amenemhat II while the latter (Sarenput II) is more expressive, realistic and detailed, reflecting the style in use during the subsequent reign of Senusret II: both statues are considered to be masterpieces of the Middle Kingdom sculpture. Another statue depicting Sarenput II, and probably coming from his tomb, is again stylistically typical of the reign of Amenemhat II.

== Death and Burial ==
=== Tomb ===
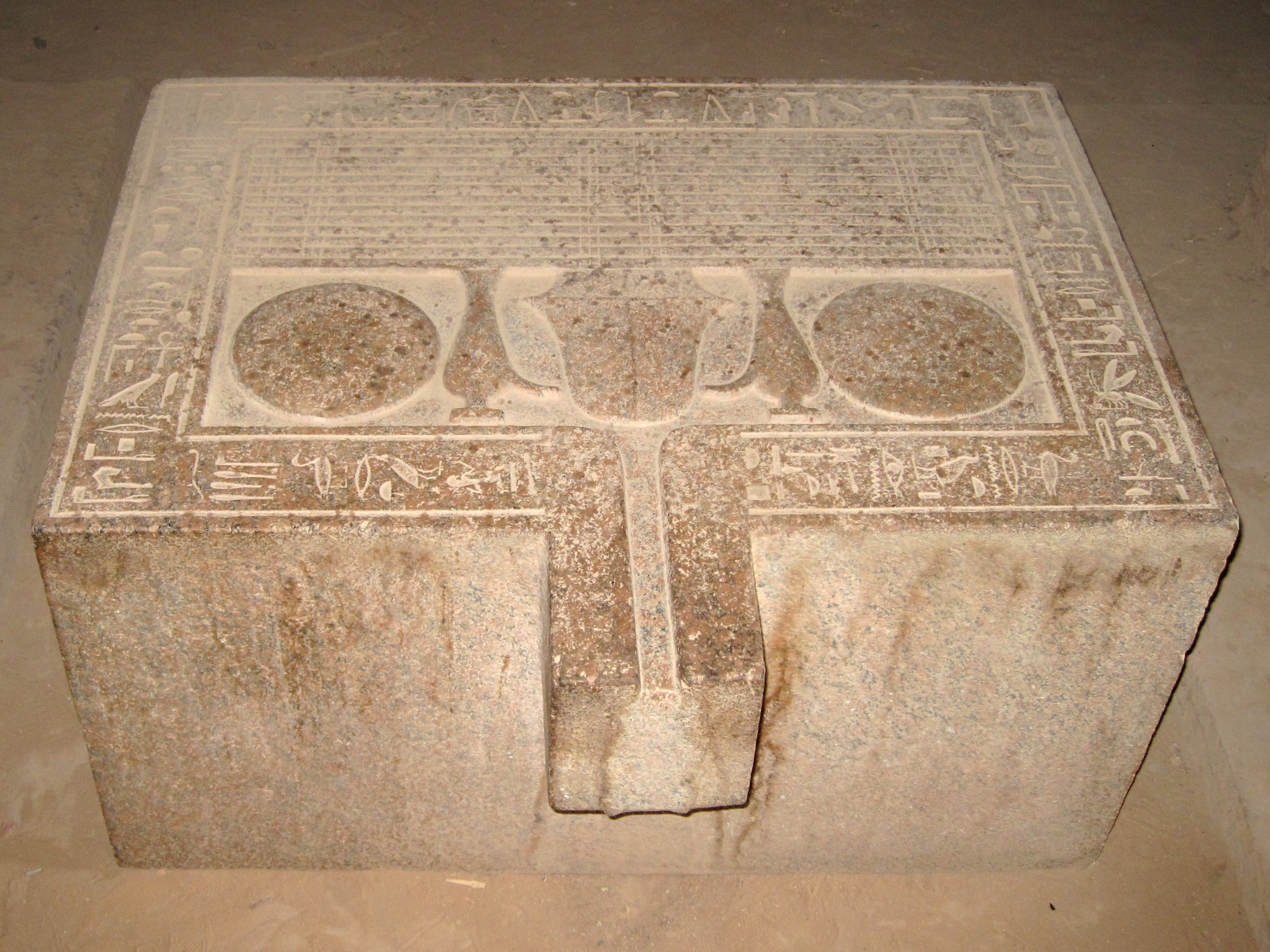
Interior of the rock tomb of Sarenput II at Qubbet el-Hawa near Aswan, Egypt

Sarenput II built for himself the finest and largest tomb of Qubbet el-Hawa (No. 31). After crossing a courtyard, a hallway led to a large hall whose ceiling is supported by six pillars. Then another hallway – with several niches containing osirian statues of Sarenput on both sides – lead to the inner room, with four pillars and a niche once hosting a granodiorite statue whose remains are now in the British Museum (EA98). Despite the tomb's grandeur, only the niche and a few pillars in the innermost chamber are decorated; nevertheless, the scenes are vividly painted and detailed, chiefly depicting the tomb owner.

== See also ==
- Sarenput I
