= Sarenput I =

Egyptian official

Sarenput I sꜣ-rnpwt
- Nomarch of the 1st nome of Upper Egypt
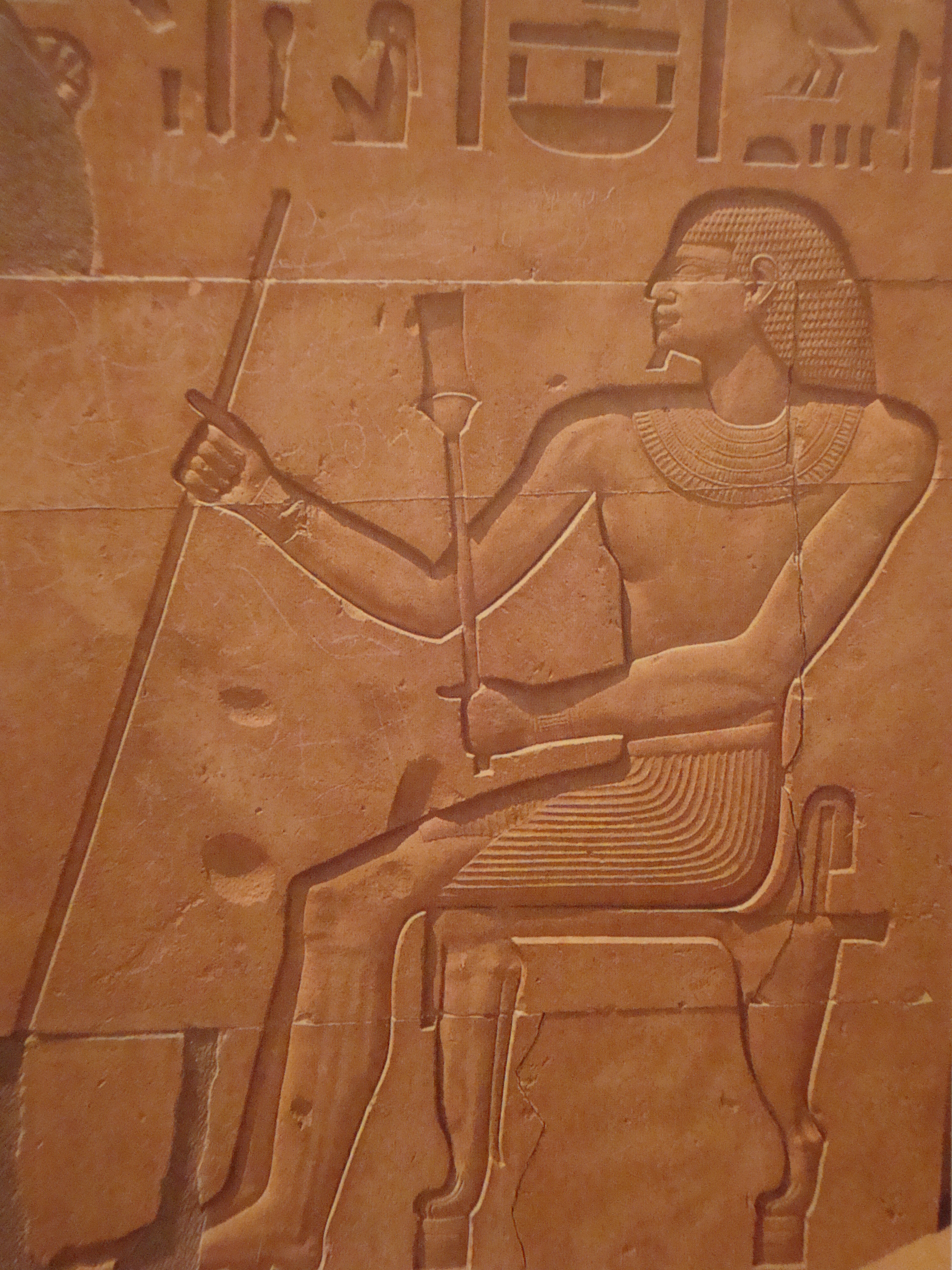
- Relief of Sarenput I on a doorjamb outside of his tomb
Egyptian name
G39 r n p w tSȝ-rnpwt
- Predecessor: none?
- Successor: Heqaib I
- Dynasty: 12th Dynasty
- Pharaoh: Senusret I
- Burial: Qubbet el-Hawa, tomb 36
- Children: Heqaib I (successor)

Sarenput I (Egyptian: sꜣ-rnpwt) was the Nomarch of Elephantine during the reign of pharaoh Senusret I of the early 12th Dynasty during the Middle Kingdom of Egypt (Middle Bronze Age).

== Family ==
Several family members are known. His paternal line may have held the title ḥqꜣ n ꜣbw (Ruler of Abu/Elephantine).

- Father: ḥqꜣ n ꜣbw ḥp (ḥp). He was son of nb-ḫntj and born to gꜣwt-ꜥnqt.
- Spouse: ḥmt-nṯr nt ḥwt-ḥr; nbt pr sꜣt-ṯnj (Sattjeni).

Children

- Son: ḥꜣtj-ꜥ; jmj-rꜣ ḥmw-nṯr ḥqꜣ-jb (Heqaib I), named after legendary Heqaib of the 6th Dynasty.
- Daughter: sꜣt-ṯnj (sꜣt-ṯnj).
- Son: ḥqꜣ-jb ḥrj-jb (ḥqꜣ-jb ḥrj-jb).
- Son: ḥqꜣ-jb šrj (ḥqꜣ-jb šrj).

== Career ==
His father is not explicitly named in the biographical inscriptions in his tomb (QH 36), which is common for "new men" appointed by the crown. He was a protégé of Senusret I, and his rise to power appears to be a reward for military or administrative service rather than hereditary right.

In his tomb, Sarenput I recorded a long title string: jrj-pꜥt; ḥꜣtj-ꜥ; ḫtmw-bjtj; smr wꜥtj; jmj-rꜣ ḥmw-nṯr; jmj-rꜣ ḥmw-nṯr n sṯt nbt ꜣbw; ḥrj-tp (n) ḥmw-kꜣ; jmj-rꜣ ḥmw-nṯr n ẖnmw; ḥrj-sštꜣ n nsw m mšꜥ; ḥrj-sštꜣ n mdw-nṯr; sḏm sḏmt; ḥqꜣ ḫꜣswt; jmj-rꜣ ꜥḥꜥw wr m pr-nsw; ḥrj-tp ꜥꜣ n tꜣ-sṯj; jmj-rꜣ jꜥꜣw; jmj-rꜣ ḫꜣst nb(t); jmj-rꜣ ḫꜣst jꜥꜣw; ẖrj-ḥb ḥrj tp; jmj-rꜣ ꜥꜣ ꜣbw; jrj-nḫn m pr sṯt; ḫrp ḥmww wr; rḫ-nsw mꜣꜥ; ḥꜣtj-ꜥ sꜣ-rnpwt.

Sarenput held several titles such as nomarch of the 1st nome of Upper Egypt ("Land of the Bow"), mayor of Elephantine, overseer of the priests of Satet, overseer of the foreign lands and many others. Like his distant predecessors Harkhuf and Heqaib, he also was the king's personal trading agent for the goods from Nubia and had a role in one of Senusret I's military campaign in this country, when the king rewarded Sarenput as reported in the latter's autobiography from his tomb. The same king appointed Sarenput as nomarch, probably the first one for this nome.

=== Sanctuary of Heqaib ===
Many of Sarenput's attestations came from the sanctuary of Heqaib at Elephantine, where he ordered a shrine for the deified Heqaib and also one for himself, provided by many stelae and a statue depicting him.

== Attestations ==
Sarenput I is attested by several artefacts.

- Habachi, Heqaib, no. 1 | At Elephantine, a naos with the royal name of Senusret I along with Sarenput I.
- Aswan 1319 | At Elephantine, a granite statue of a seated man showing Sarenput I, with title string "jrj-pꜥt; ḥꜣtj-ꜥ; jmj-rꜣ ḥmw-nṯr; ḥqꜣ n ꜣbw sꜣ-rnpwt".

== Death and burial ==
=== Tomb ===
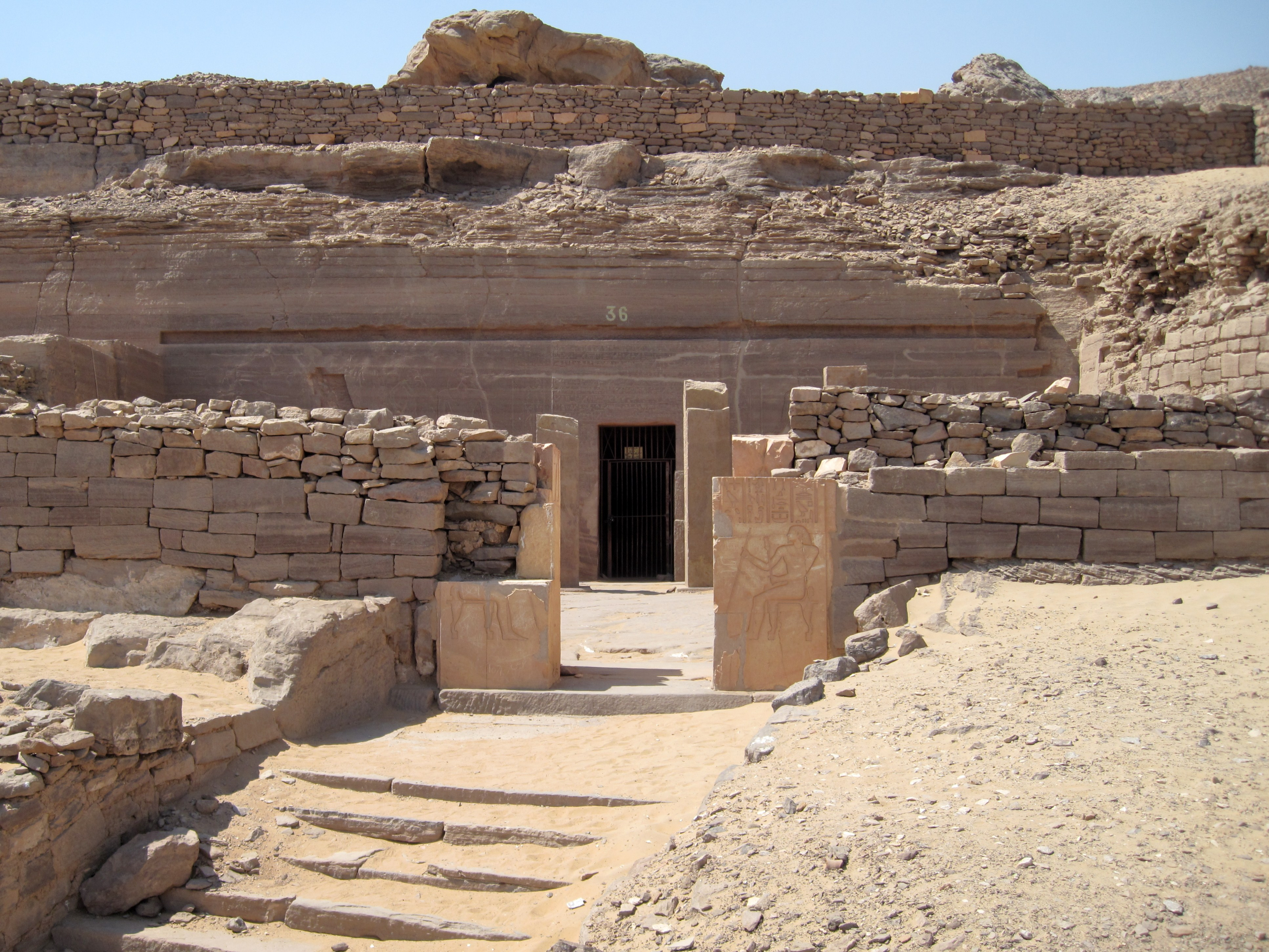
Tomb of Sarenput I at Qubbet el-Hawa

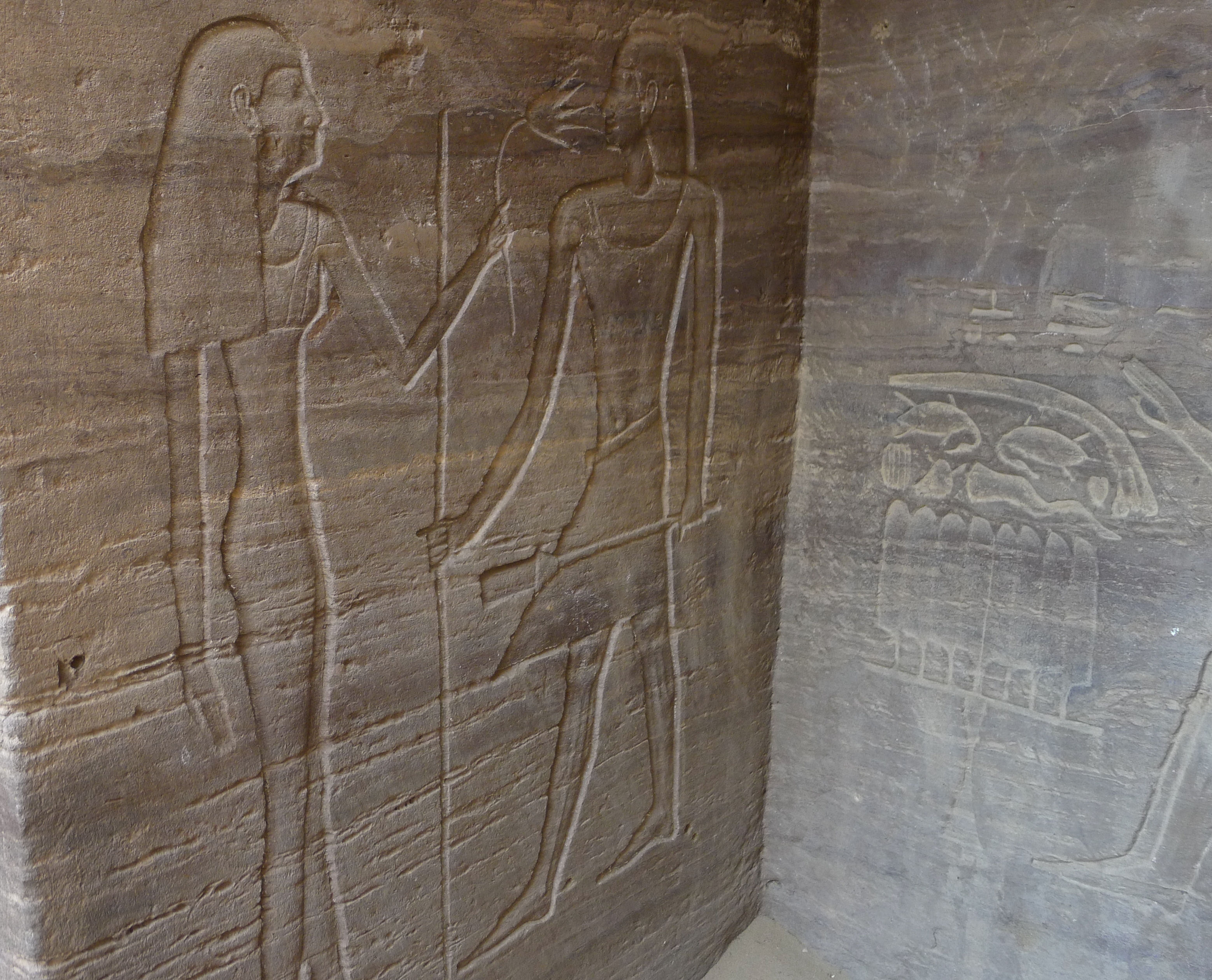
Sarenput I receives a flower in his tomb.

Sarenput I was buried in a large rock-cut tomb at Qubbet el-Hawa (No. 36) opposite Aswan, which was decorated in sunk reliefs at the outside, and lively painted in the interior. The tomb is composed of three rooms connected by hallways; the first two chambers are provided with colonnades while the innermost has a niche that once housed a statue of the owner. Unfortunately, the whole tomb suffered significant damage over time.

The photographic archive of the Museo Egizio in Turin preserves a group of photographs of tomb QH36 taken during the Schiaparelli excavations of 1914, together with a detail photograph dated 1903-1913. The exterior photographs document the entrance while it was still partly covered by sand, the courtyard and facade after clearance, the transition from the courtyard to the rock-cut chambers, and the facade walls north and south of the entrance.

Exterior of tomb QH36 during the Schiaparelli excavations, 1914

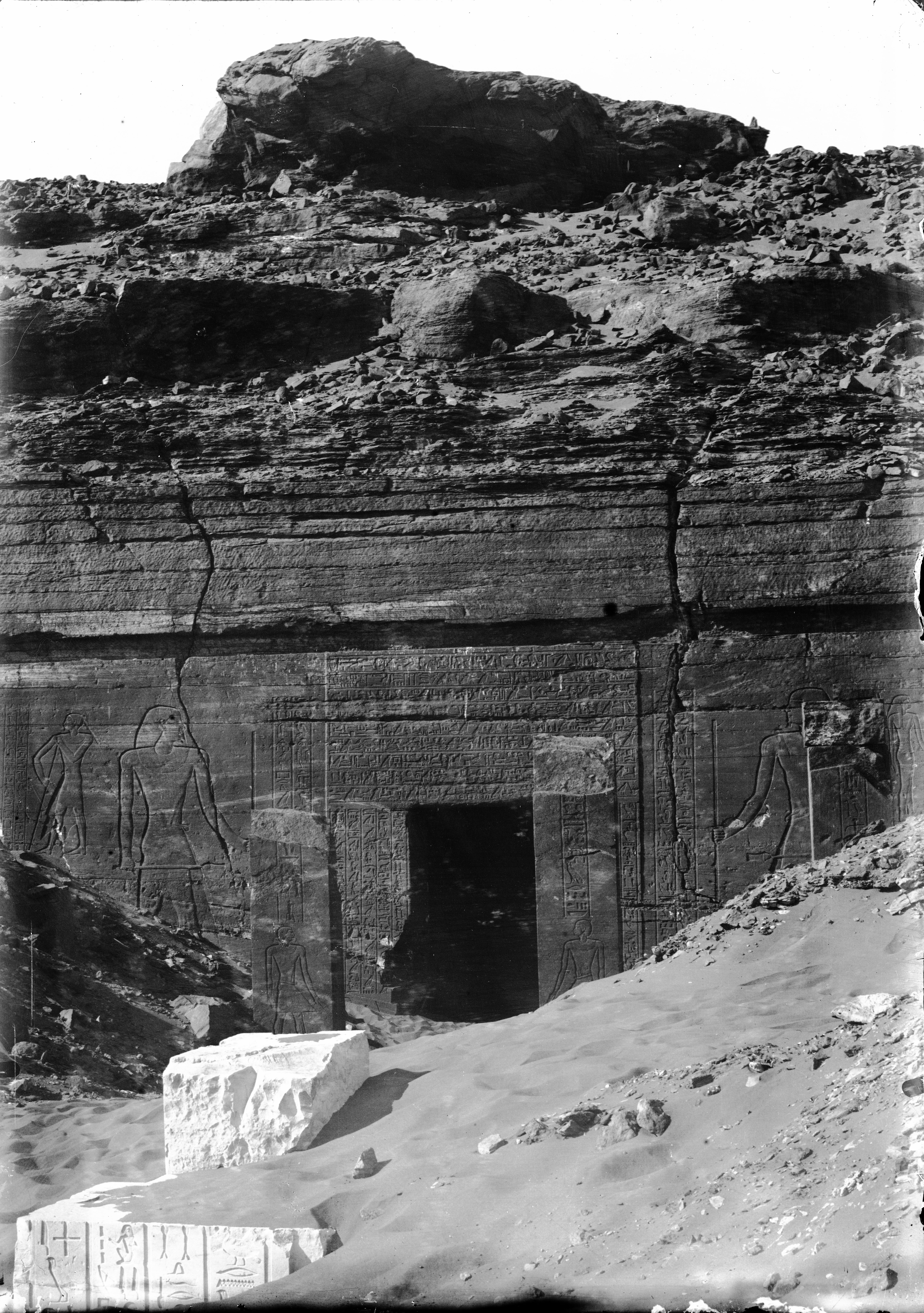
Entrance, still partly covered by sand.

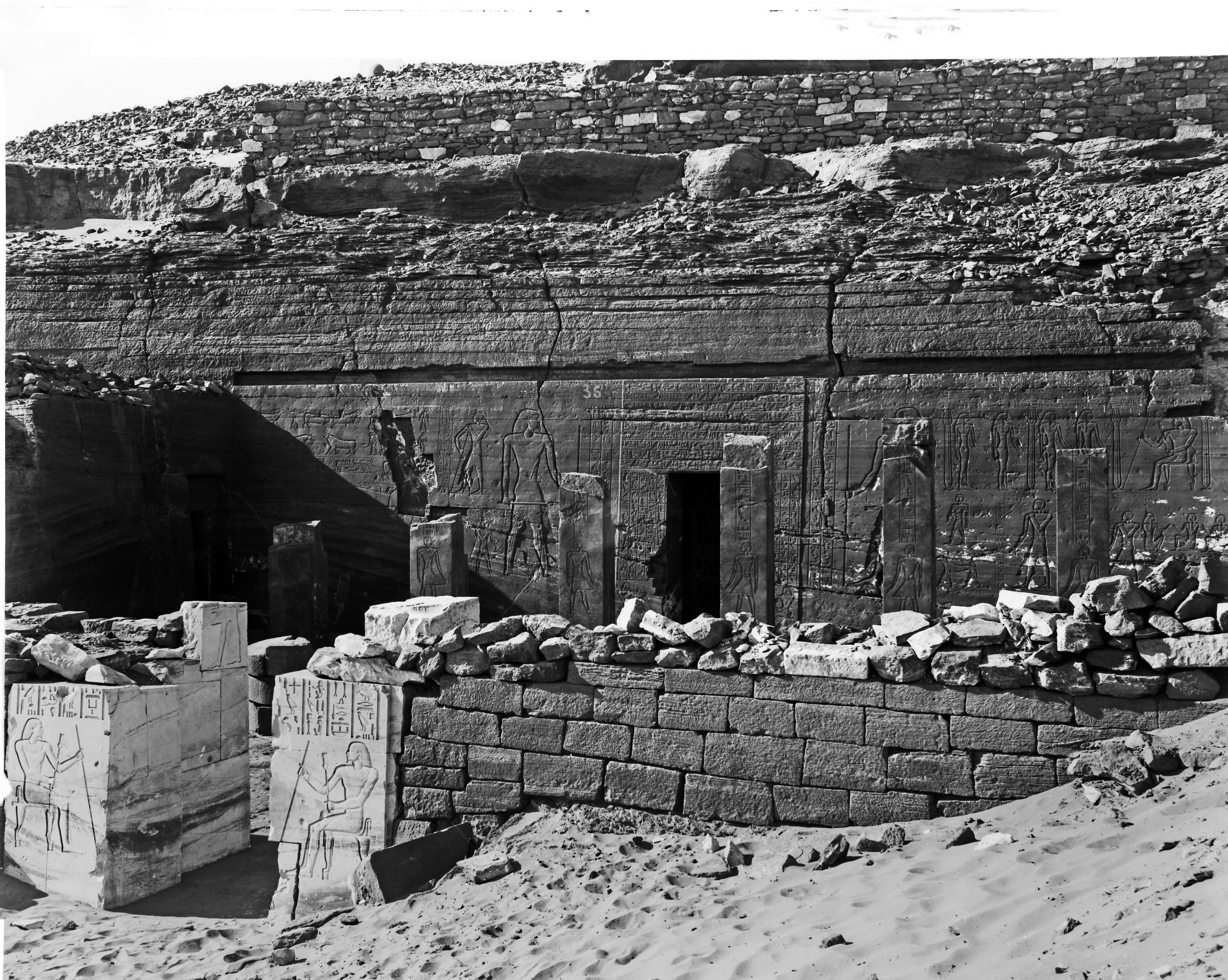
Courtyard and facade after clearance.

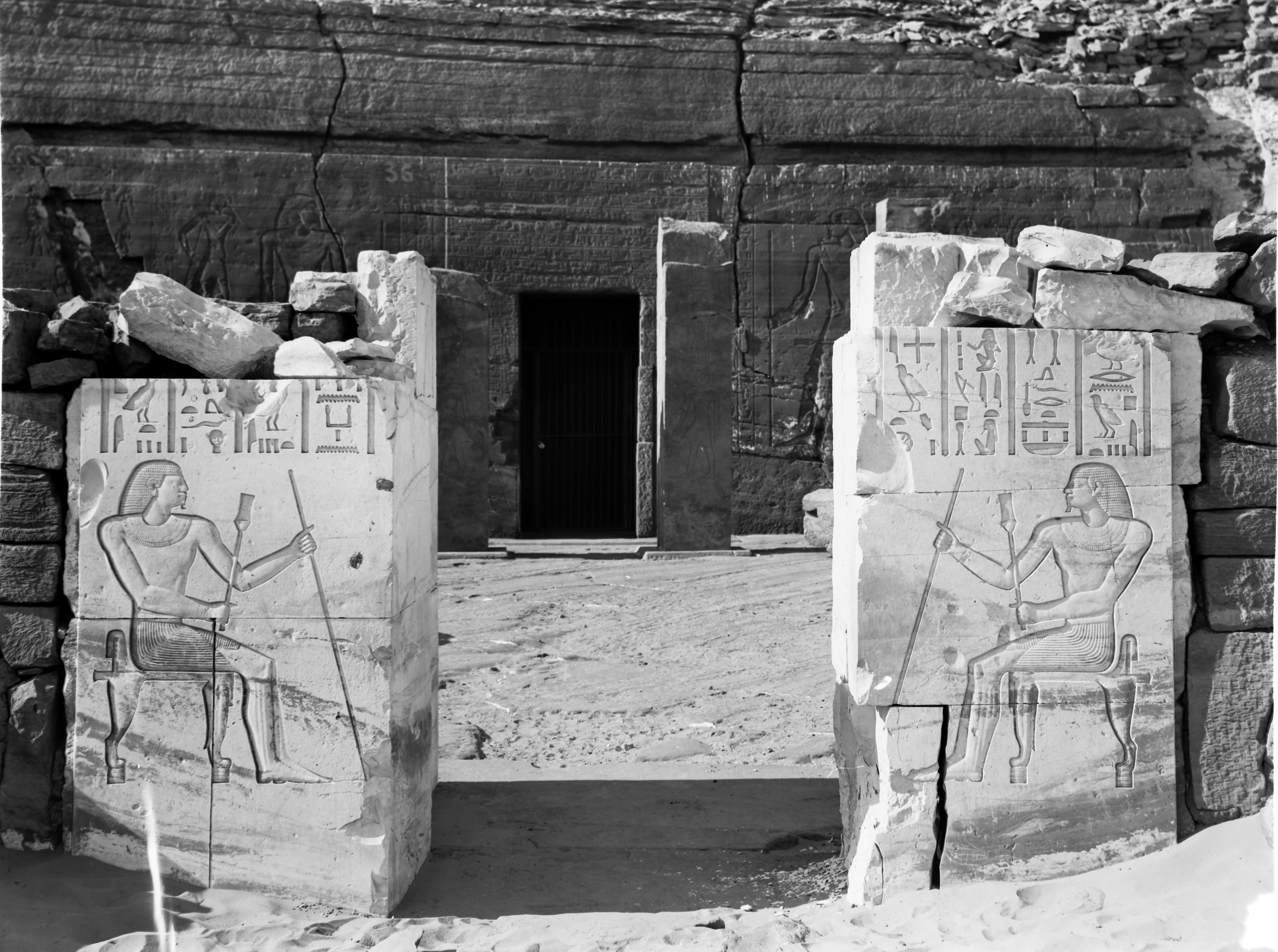
Courtyard entrance and access to the chambers.

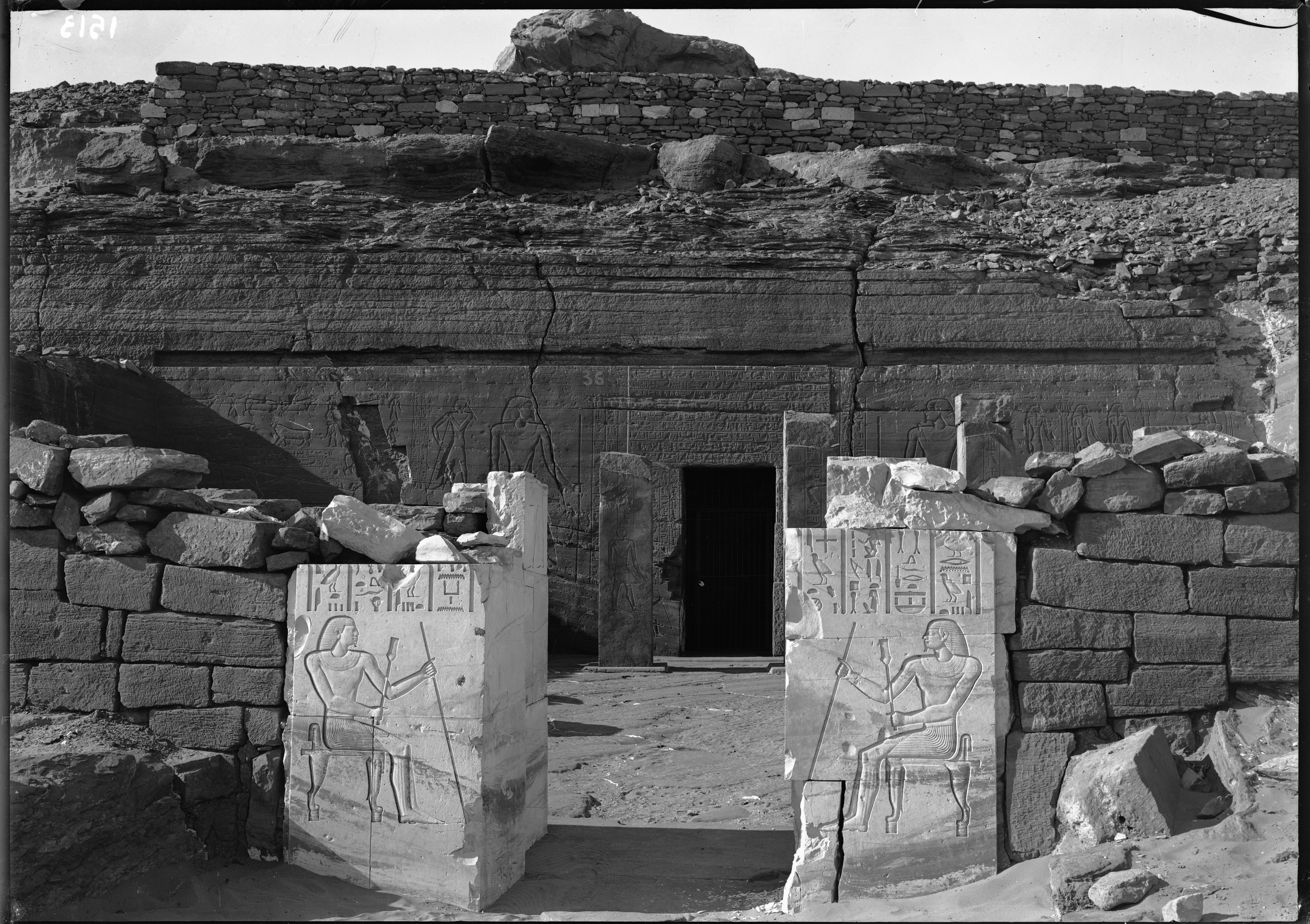
Courtyard entrance, closer view.

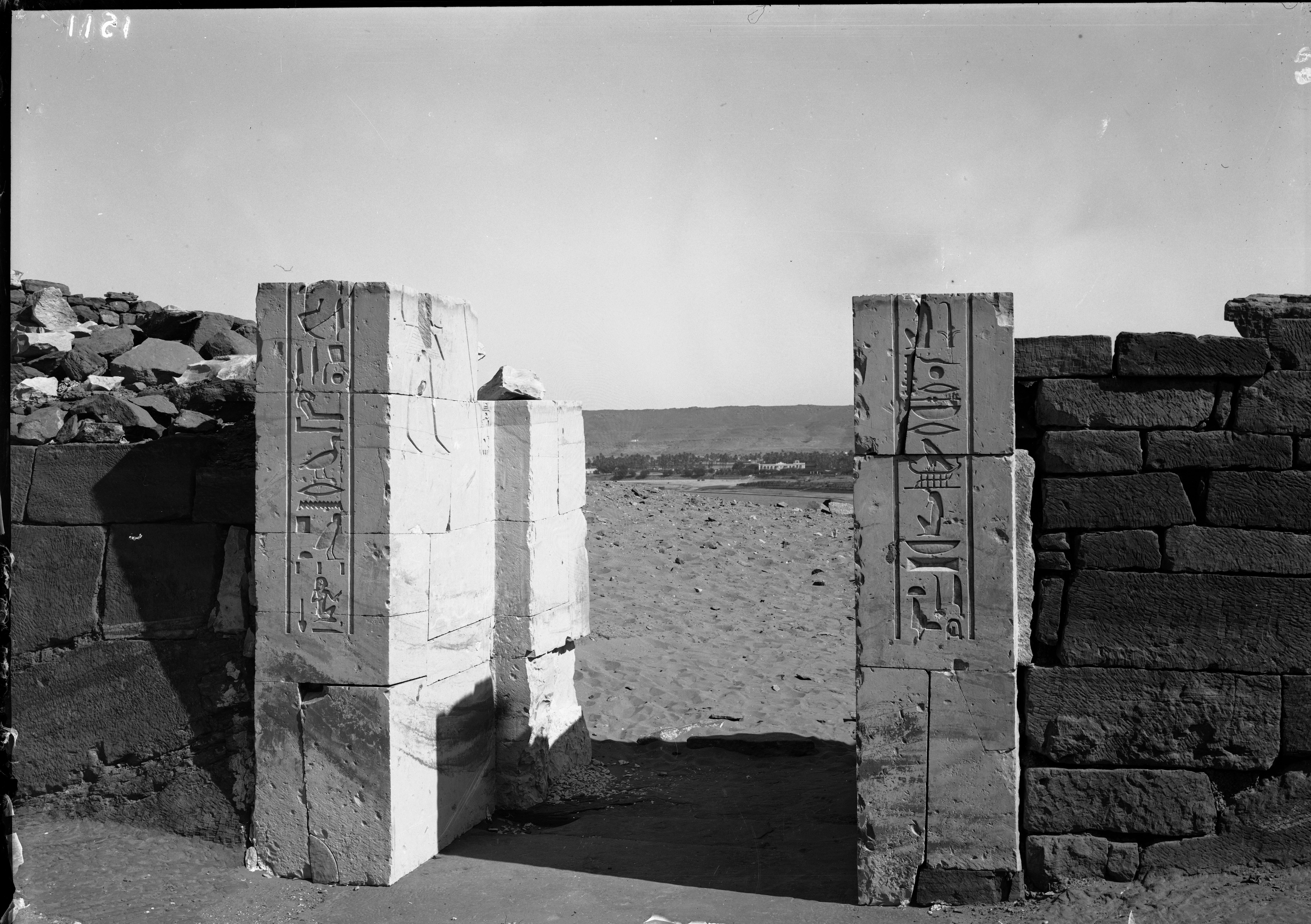
View from the courtyard toward the Nile and Aswan.

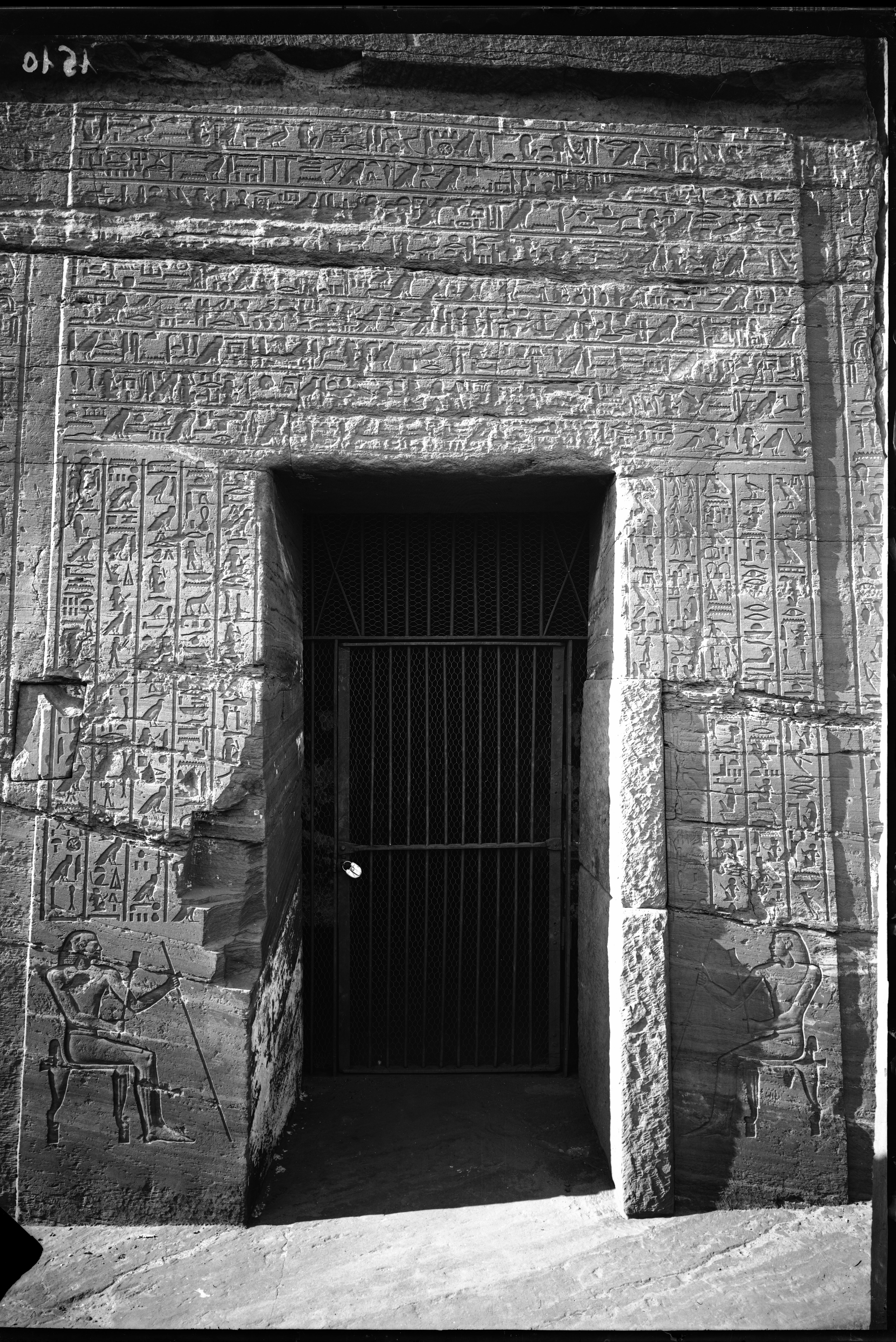
Entrance to the rock-cut chambers.

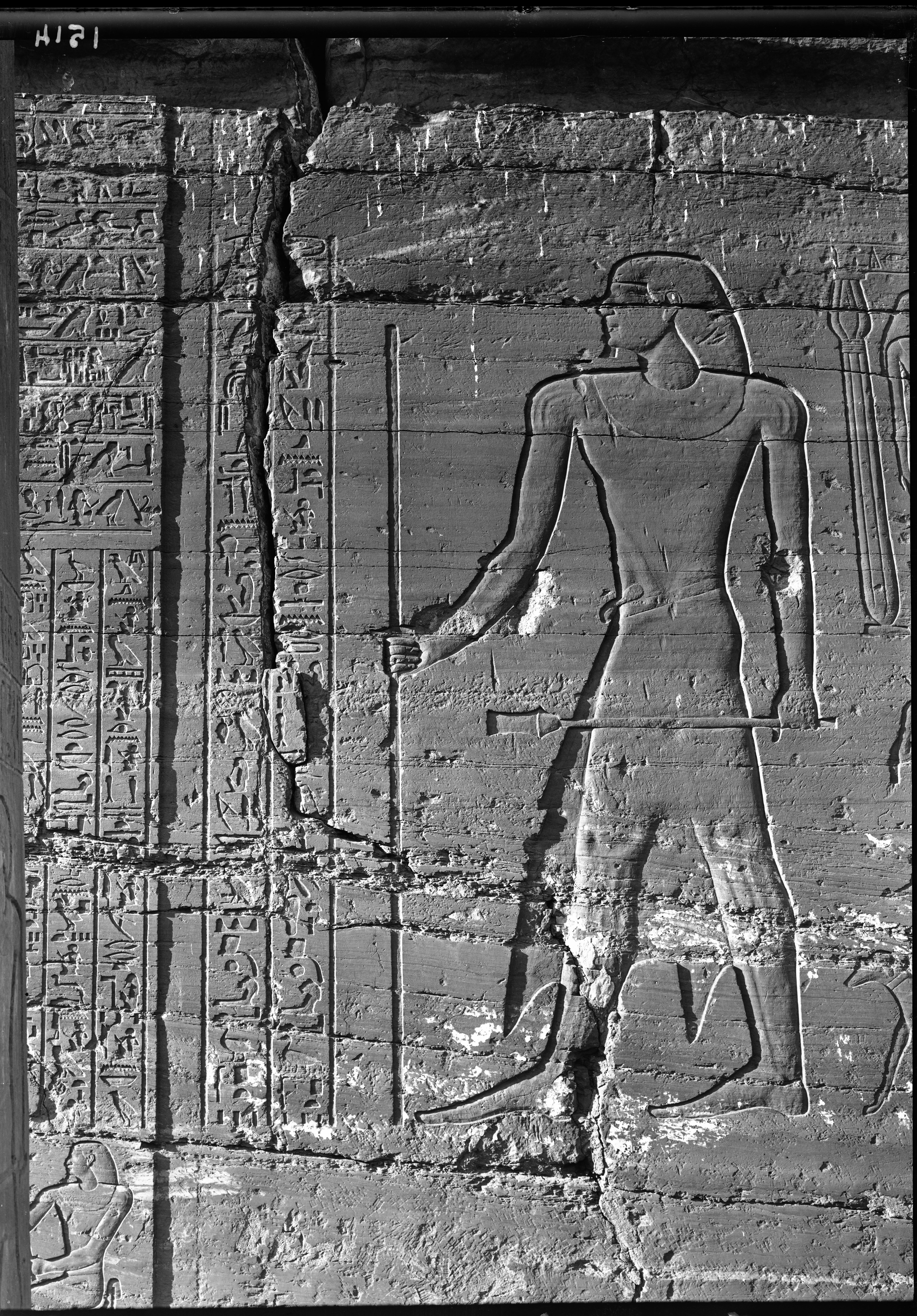
North facade wall, right of the entrance.

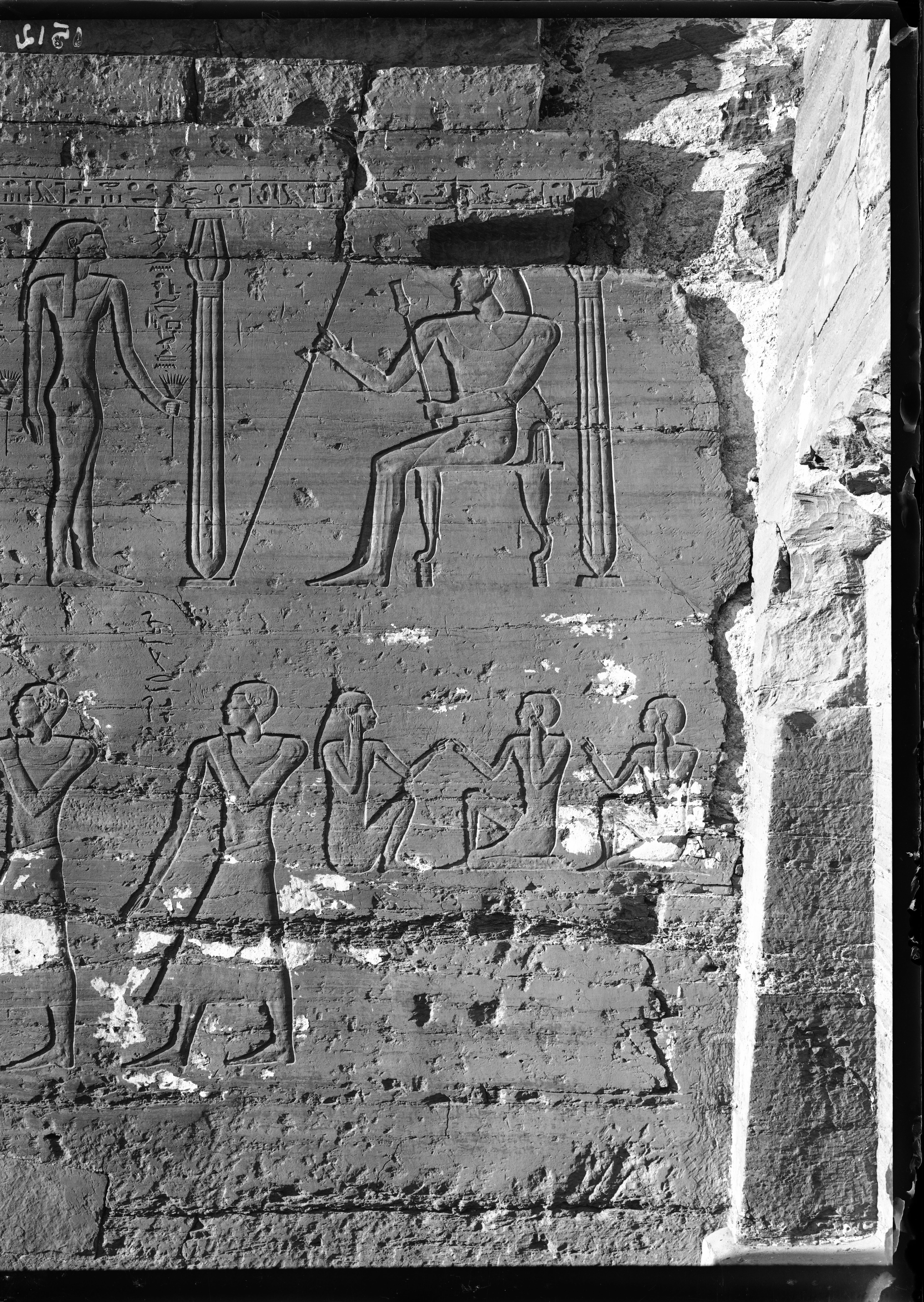
Detail of the north facade wall.

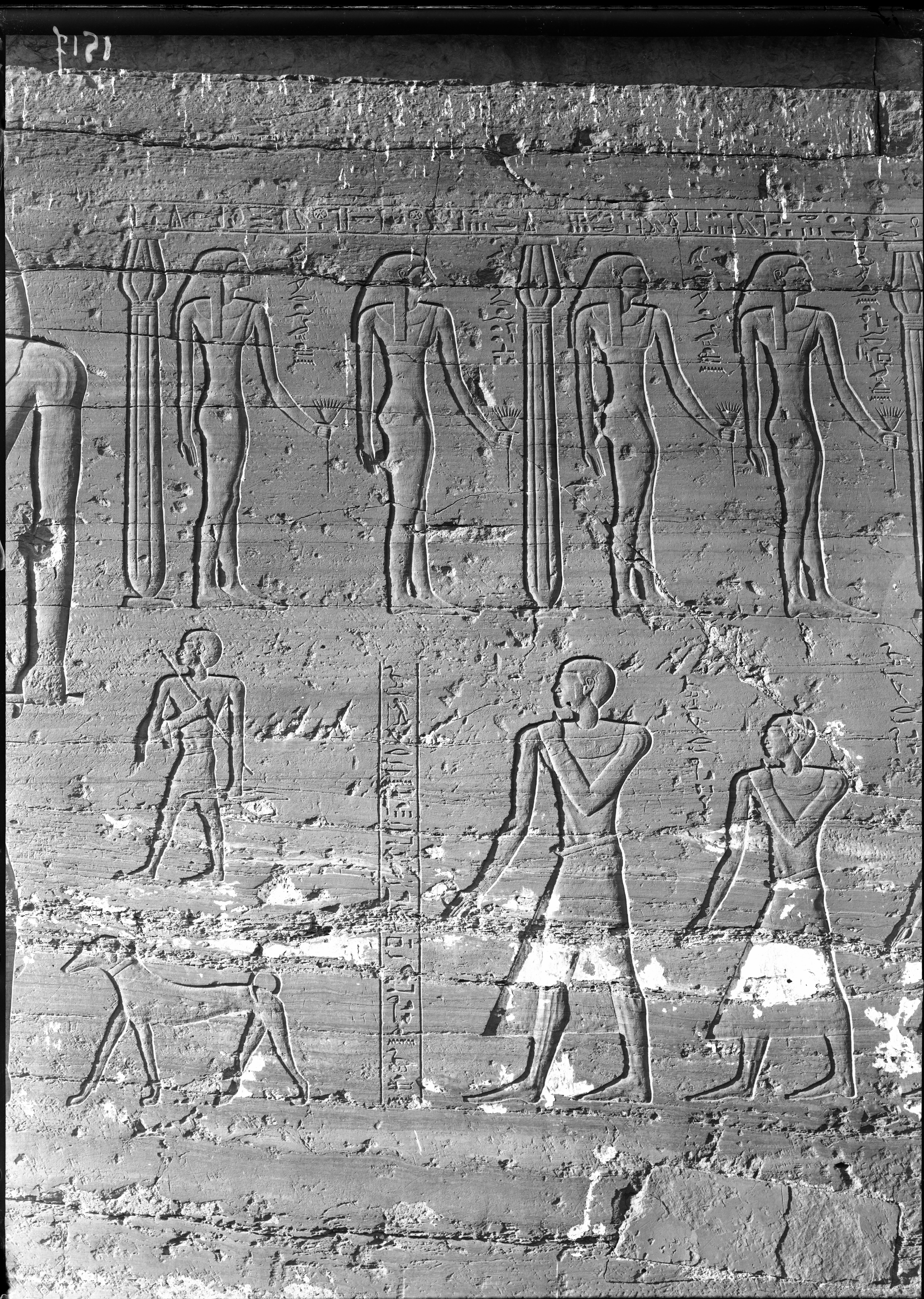
Further view of the north facade wall.

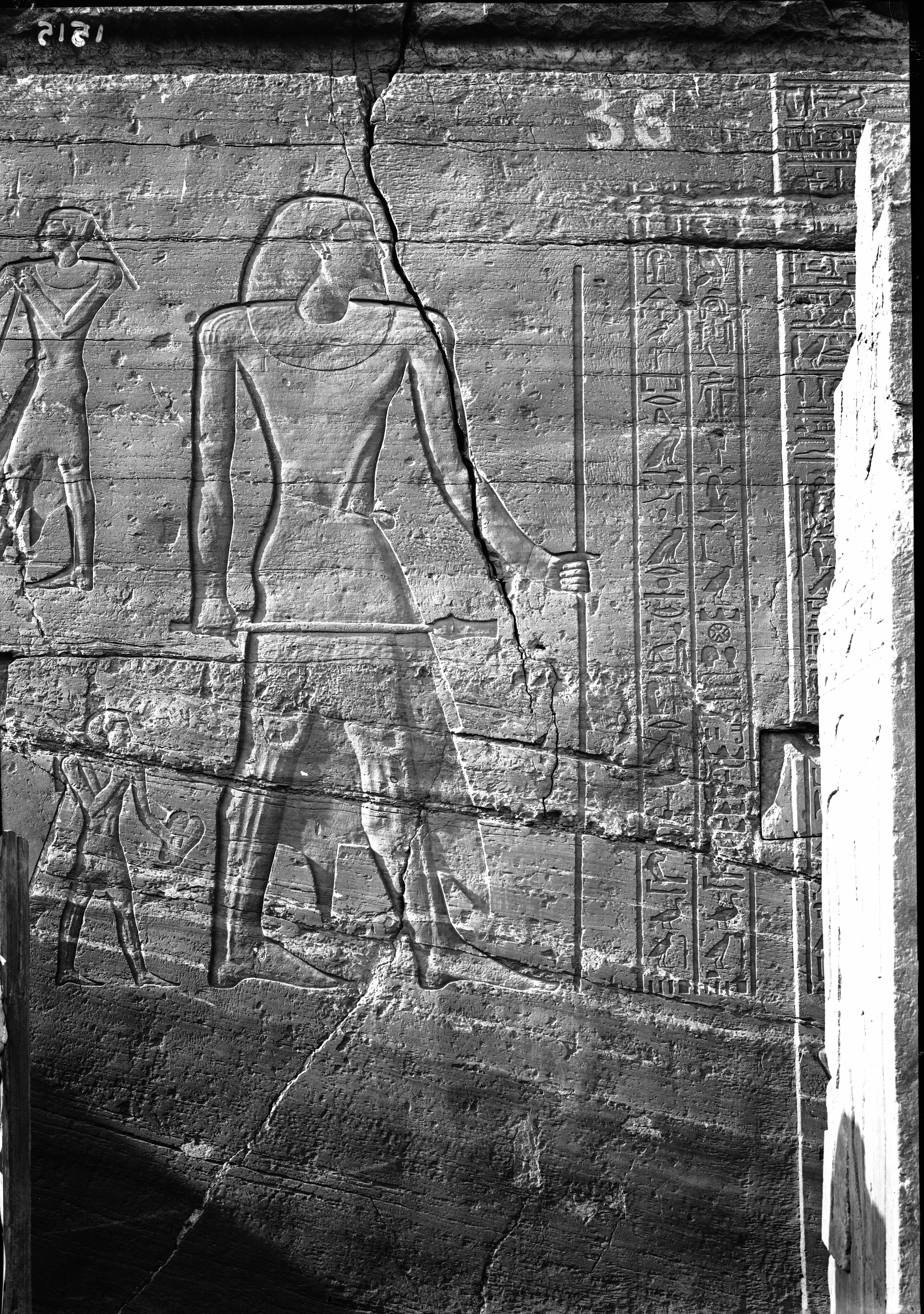
South facade wall, left of the entrance.

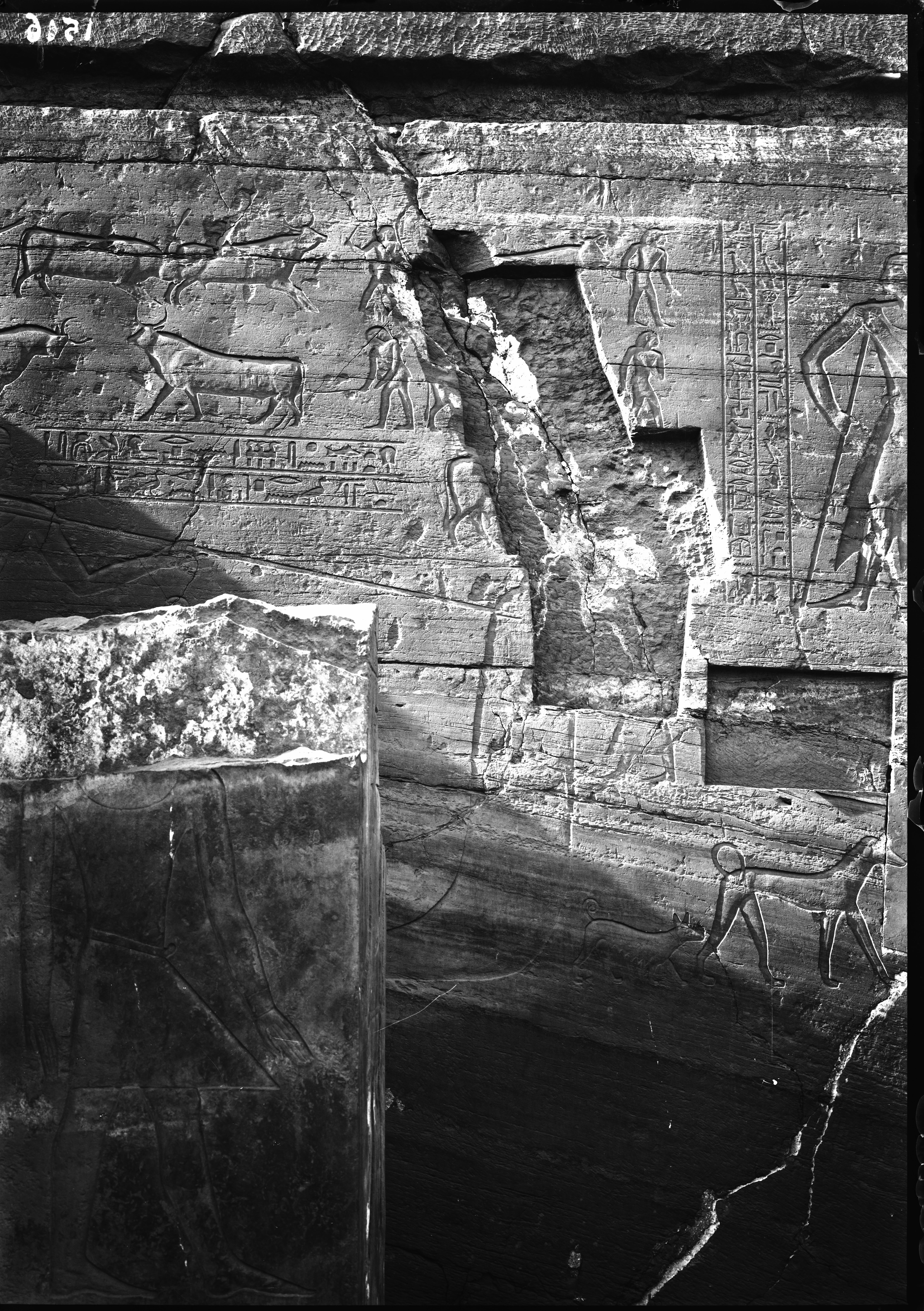
Detail of the south facade wall.

The outer reliefs often depict Sarenput with some of his relatives and his dogs, while among the surviving inner paintings there is a scene of the owner with the god Khnum, which is significant because in this period, a similar scene in a private tomb was still rare. The aforementioned autobiography is written in two copies, one outside and one inside the tomb. The archive photographs of the interior show the pillared chamber, where an offering table is visible, and the inscribed north side of the east wall in that chamber. A further image records a detail of the decoration on an interior wall.

Interior, inscriptions and decoration of tomb QH36

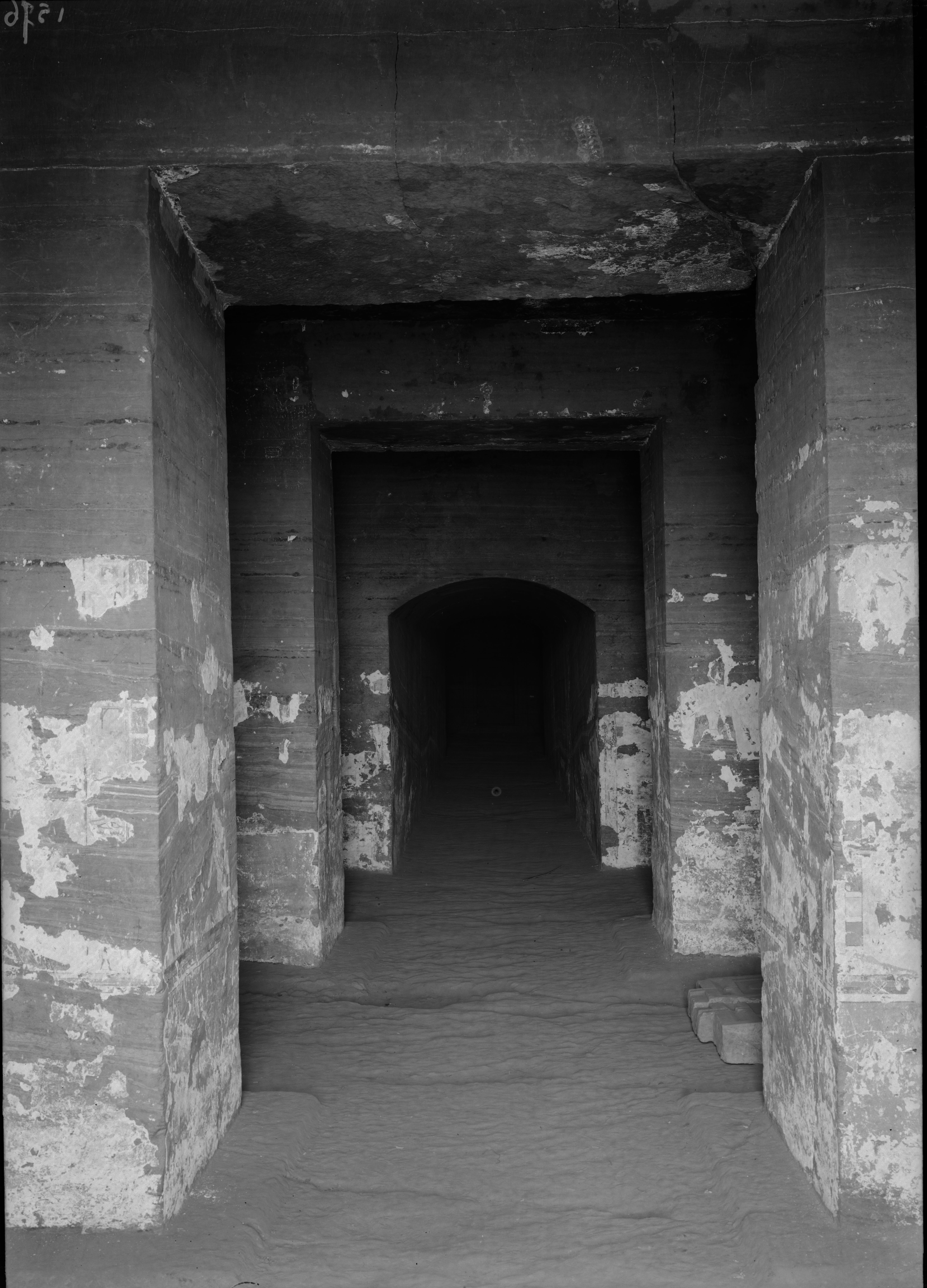
Pillared chamber with offering table.

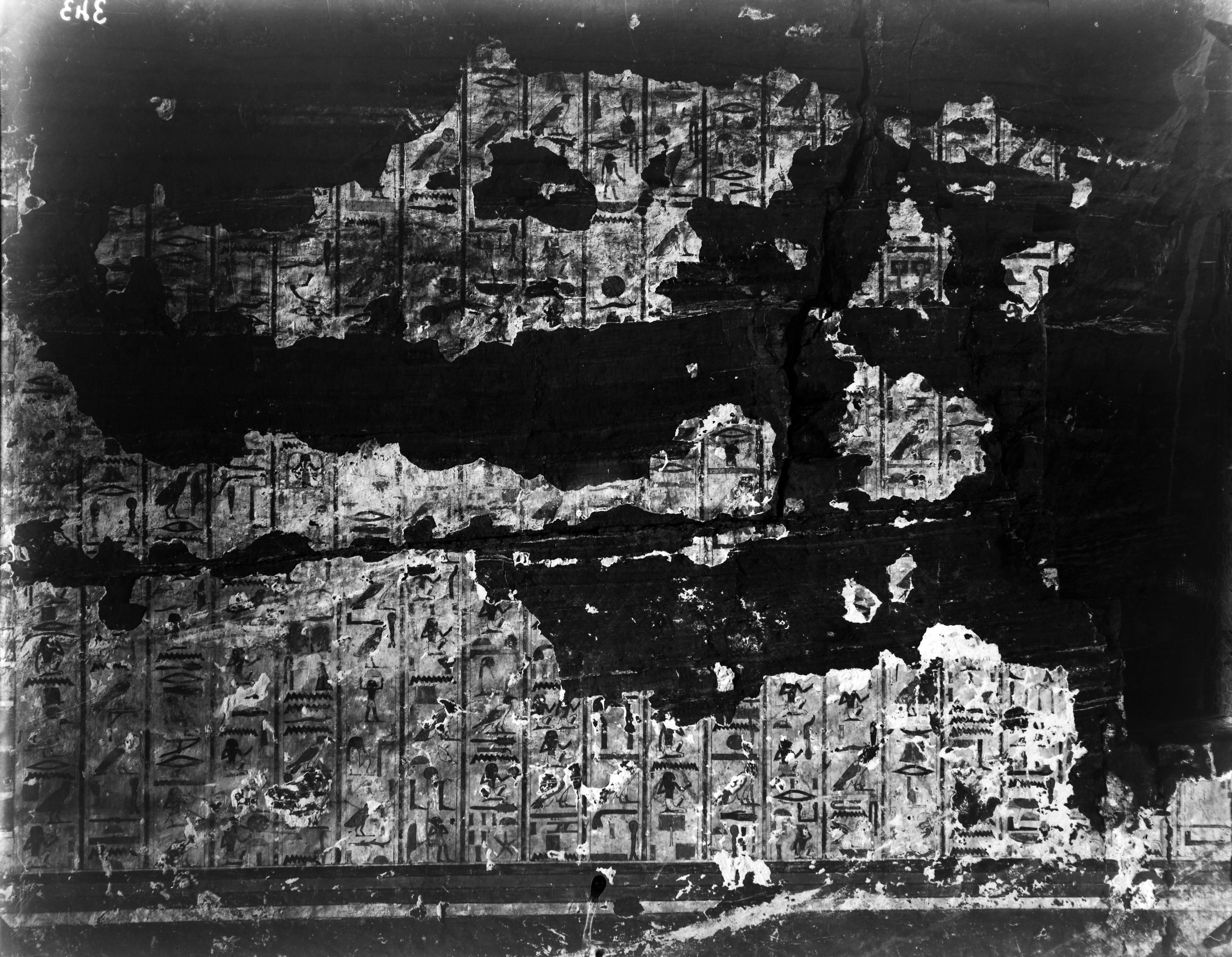
Inscribed east wall, north side.

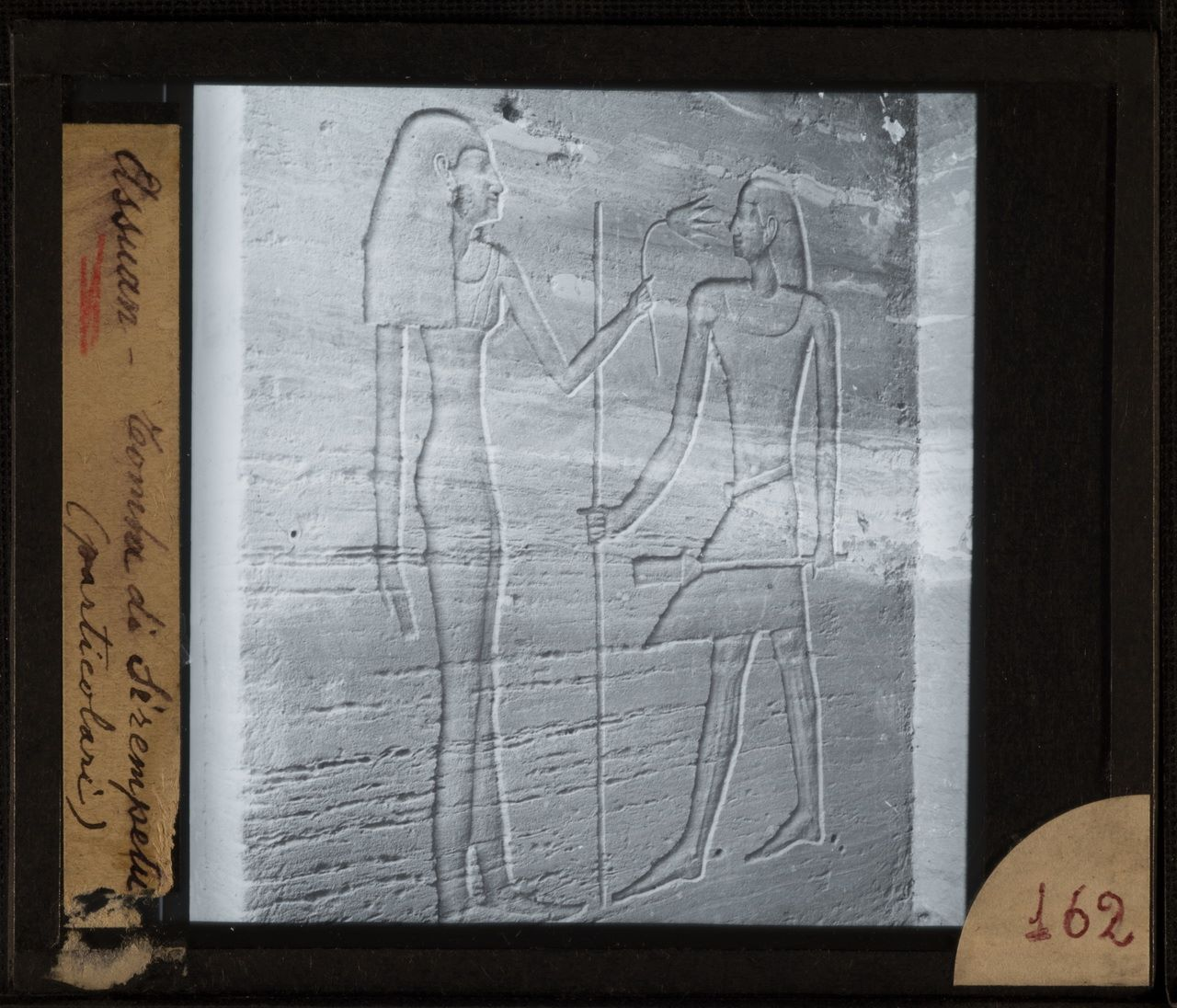
Detail of an interior decorated wall.

Nathalie Favry identified the facade text as inscription A and the interior text as inscription B; the two inscriptions reproduce the same biographical text, but they differ in graphic treatment and in the development of signs. The version inside the tomb tends to expand the writing of some words, whereas the facade version is more condensed.

There is a significant artistic contrast between the reliefs carved on the outer doorjambs, visible in the infobox image, and those on the facade of the tomb; the former are much finer and may have been made by a royal sculptor, while the latter are cruder and probably a local product.

== See also ==
- Sarenput II – His nephew, also a nomarch of the same nome
