= Historical names of Nubia =

Nubia is the term commonly used by scholars to refer to the land located south of Ancient Egypt, from the city of Elephantine down to modern-day Khartoum. Nubia has been one of the earliest humanly inhabited lands in the world. Its history is tied to that of Egypt, from which it became independent in the 10th century BC. The rich gold deposits in Nubia made the latter the target of Ancient Egyptians, Greeks, Romans and later Arabs. Research on Nubia has allowed scholars to find several of its references.

== Historical References to Nubia ==
=== Egyptians ===
Ancient Egyptians referred to Nubia as several different names. The aforementioned Nubia is derived from the Egyptian word from nub, the Egyptian word for "gold." It is believed that the Nubians were the first people along the Nile to mine for gold, later introducing the mineral to Egyptians and earning their name.

Because Nubians were very skilled archers, Egyptians also called Nubia and the southernmost region of Egypt (near Elephantine) by the moniker Ta-Seti, meaning "Land of the Bow." Accordingly, the Nubian inhabitants were named Iuntiu-setiu, which translates to "Bowmen." Ta-Nehesy and Ta-Nehasyu were also used by both Nubians and Egyptians as another word for Nubia, with Nubians being named Nehesy at times.

It has also been argued by historians that Ta-Netjer (meaning "God's Land") and Punt refer to a region in Upper Nubia near Medja.

=== Greeks and Romans ===
Greeks occupied Egypt from the Ptolemaic Period (332-30BC), they called the land south of Egypt, Aethiopia. Romans adopted that name for Nubia when they came and defeated the Ptolemaic Dynasty.

=== Arabs and English ===
Arabs conquered Egypt in 641AD, and were planning to attack Bilad al-Sudan, or The Land of the Blacks. That was the name Arabs used to refer to Nubia. That name was still used in 1820, when Mohammed Ali Pasha or Mehmet Ali became the viceroy of Egypt. When The English came and conquered the area, they adopted the name Sudan from the Arab term to refer to that area.
