= Irem Y. Tumer =

American mechanical engineer

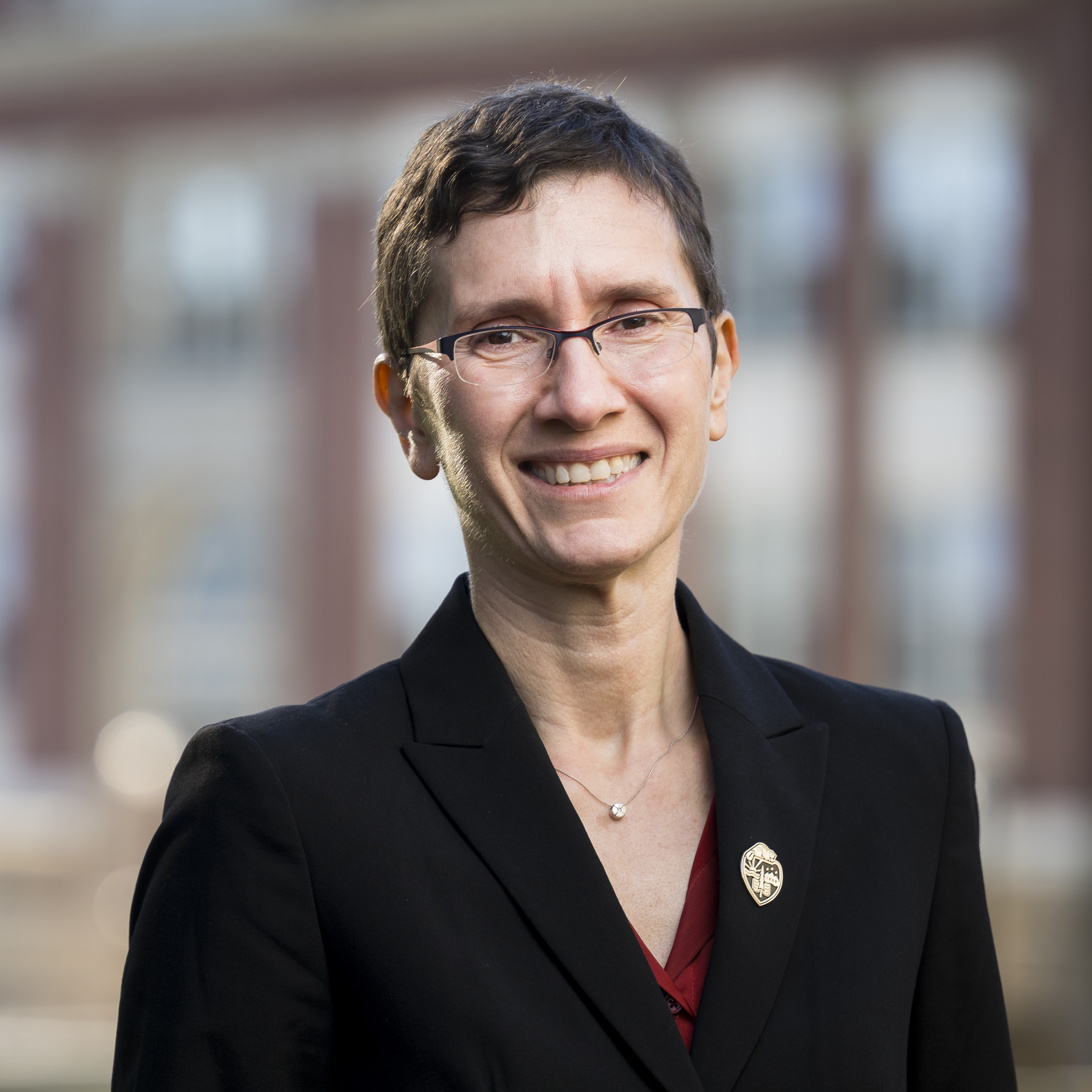
- Tumer in 2023
- Education: University of Texas at Austin
- Scientific career
- Fields: Mechanical engineering, systems engineering
- Workplaces: Ames Research Center; Oregon State University

Irem Y. Tumer is an American mechanical engineer and academic administrator serving as the vice president for research and innovation at Oregon State University (OSU). A former researcher at Ames Research Center, specialized in system-level design and analysis for complex engineered systems. In 2024, she was named the 2025 chair of the Council on Research for the Association of Public and Land-grant Universities (APLU).

== Education ==
Tumer received her bachelor's, master's, and doctoral degrees in mechanical engineering from Cockrell School of Engineering at University of Texas at Austin. She earned a B.S. in 1991, a M.S. in 1995, and a Ph.D. in 1998. The title of her doctoral dissertation is "Foundations of Condition Monitoring for Manufacturing and Design." Her doctoral supervisors were Kristin L. Wood and Ilene Busch-Vishniac.

== Career ==
From 1998 to 2006, Tumer worked at NASA's Ames Research Center. During her time there, she served as a research scientist, group lead, and program manager, and led the complex systems design and engineering group in the intelligent systems division.

In 2006, Tumer joined the faculty of Oregon State University (OSU) as a professor in the School of Mechanical, Industrial and Manufacturing Engineering. At OSU, she leads the complex engineered system design group within the design engineering labs. In 2013, she became the associate dean for research in the College of Engineering, a role she held until 2018.

Tumer's research focuses on methodologies for model-based and risk-based design in the early stages of complex systems development. Her interests include system analysis, computational design, systems engineering, and reliability engineering as applied to large-scale systems such as spacecraft, aircraft, and power grids. Tumer was named a fellow of the American Society of Mechanical Engineers (ASME) on December 1, 2017. She is a member of the Society of Women Engineers (SWE) and the American Society for Engineering Education (ASEE).

In October 2018, Tumer was appointed interim vice president for research, assuming her new duties on October 29. She filled the vacancy left by the departure of Cindy Sagers. OSU president Ed Ray asked her to serve in the interim role through December 2020. In November 2020, Tumer was officially named the vice president of research. As of 2025, she is the vice president for research and innovation.

In December 2024, Tumer was named the 2025 chair of the council on research for the Association of Public and Land-Grant Universities (APLU). She stated the position would provide OSU with "visibility in a leadership role" and that the council would focus on advocacy, industry partnerships, and exploring the advantages of artificial intelligence (AI). She emphasized that the council must be "laser focused on all things AI."
