= Ta-Seti =

Administrative division of Upper Egypt

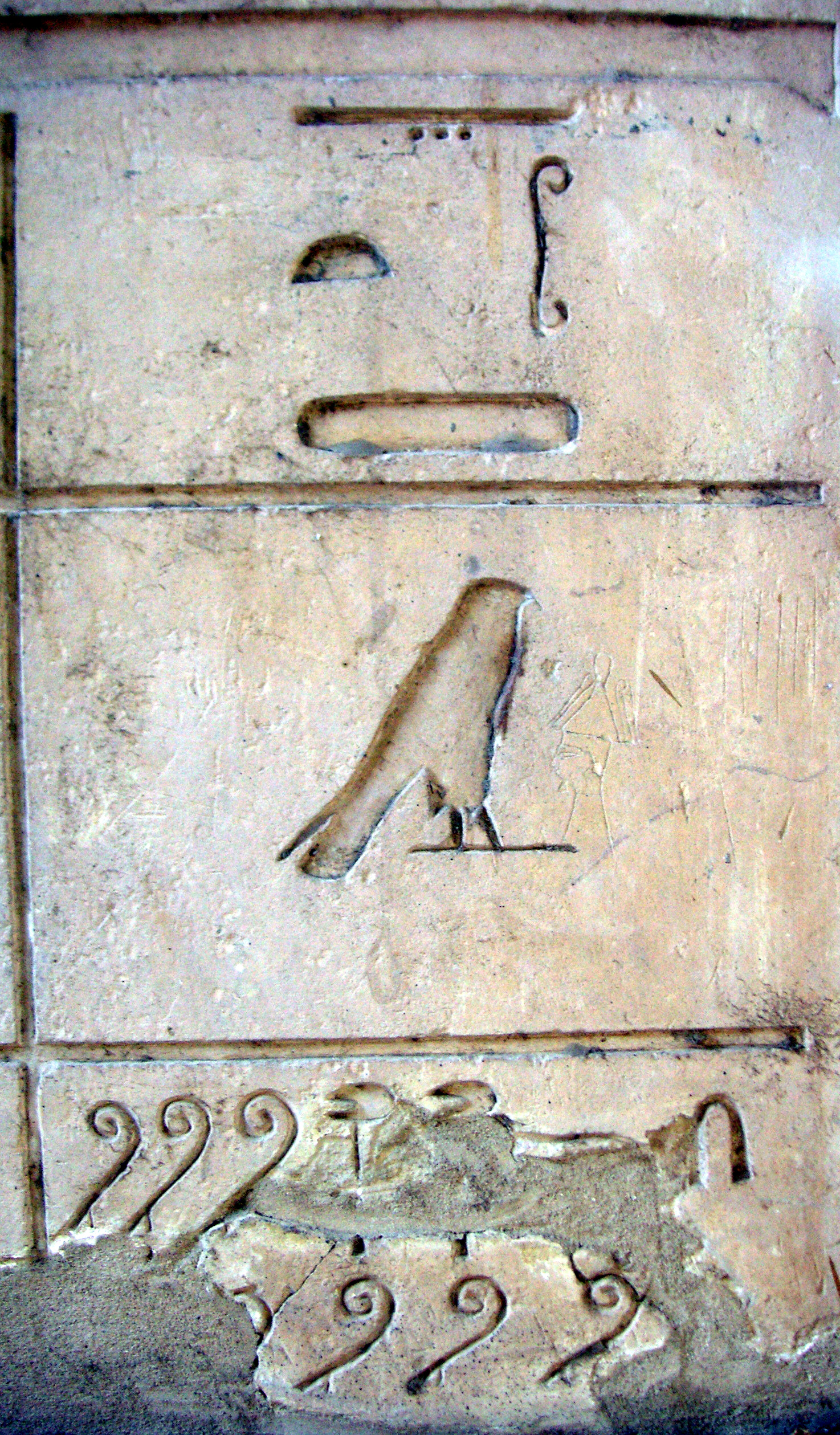
Ta-Seti (uppermost) at the "White Chapel" in Karnak

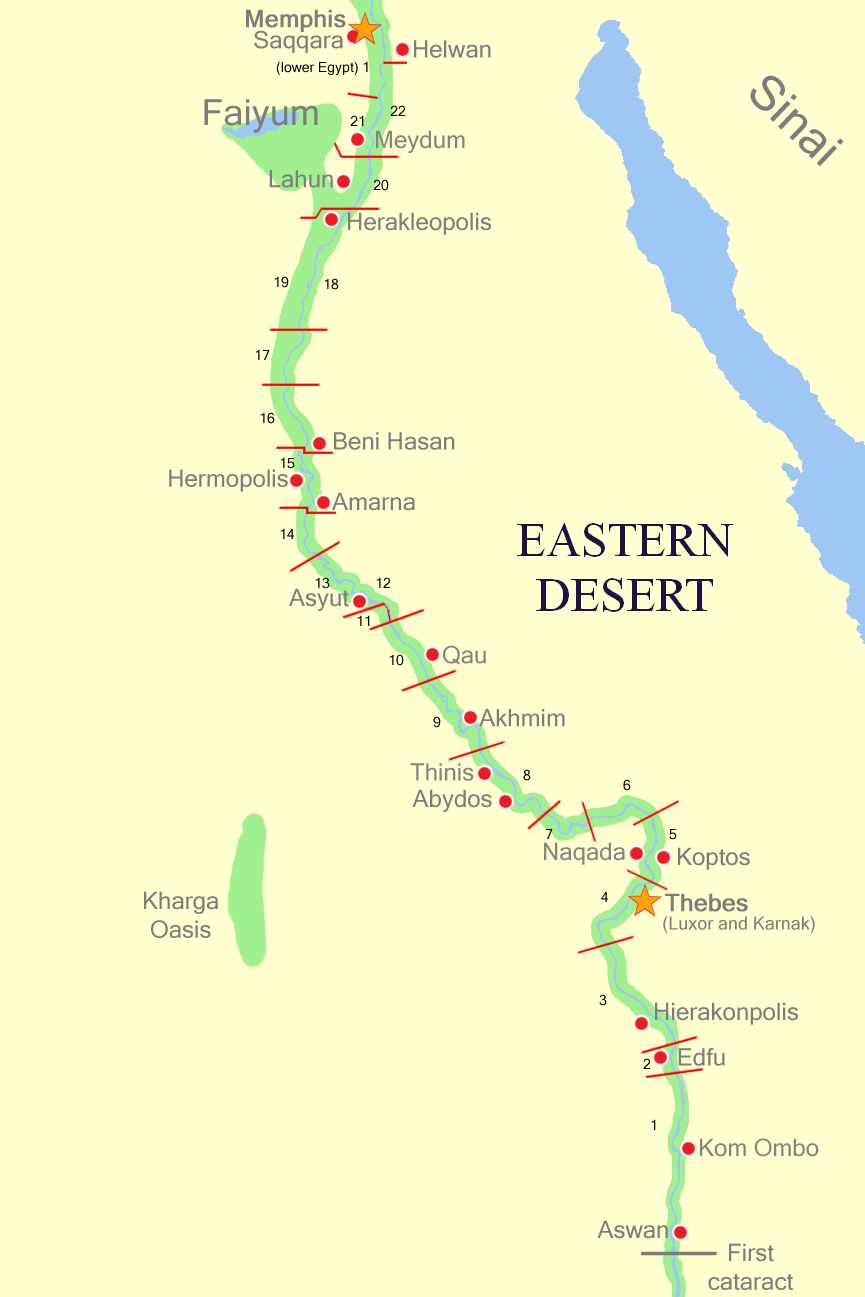
Map of all nomoi in Upper Egypt

Ta-Seti (Ancient Egyptian: tꜣ-sty, likely meaning "Land of the Bow") was the first nome (administrative division) of Upper Egypt. Situated at the southern border with Nubia, Ta-Seti played a crucial role in trade, military operations, and cultural exchange between Egypt and Nubia. Archaeologically, Ta-Seti is closely associated with Lower Nubia, an area corresponding largely to present-day northern Sudan, and is often linked to early Nubian polities such as the A-Group culture (c. 3800–3100 BCE).

The term "Ta-Seti" could also broadly refer to the Nubian region itself, highlighting close association between the two. Today, the historical region associated with Ta-Seti spans areas of southern Egypt and northern Sudan.

== Nubian origins and early development ==
Archaeological evidence from Lower Nubia suggests that the region associated with Ta-Seti was inhabited by complex Nubian societies prior to and during the Early Dynastic period of Egypt. Excavations at sites such as Qustul, Sayala, and Ballana reveal elite burials, long-distance trade networks, and material culture linked to the A-Group culture, which flourished between approximately 3800 and 3100 BCE.

Several scholars interpret these findings as evidence that Ta-Seti was not merely an Egyptian administrative frontier, but part of an early Nubian political landscape centered largely in what is now northern Sudan. These Nubian communities maintained close interaction with early Egypt, influencing and participating in the broader cultural and economic developments of the Nile Valley.

N16 T9A R12 N24
Ta-Seti
in hieroglyphs

== History ==
=== Early Nubian presence ===
Archaeological evidence from Lower Nubia indicates that the region later known as Ta-Seti was inhabited by complex Nubian societies prior to and during the Early Dynastic period of Egypt. Sites such as Qustul and Sayala reveal elite burials, long-distance trade networks, and material culture associated with the A-Group culture (c. 3800–3100 BCE), demonstrating early political and social complexity in Nubia.

=== Ta-Seti in Napatan inscriptions ===
Textual evidence from the Napatan period suggests that the name Ta-Seti continued to be in use long after the Early Dynastic period. In inscriptions of the Kushite king Taharqa, particularly those from Kawa, Ta-Seti is mentioned as a recognized region. Taharqa describes his youth in Ta-Seti before traveling north to Egypt, indicating the continued significance of the region during the Twenty-fifth Dynasty.

=== Ta-Seti in late Napatan royal ideology ===
Further evidence for the continued recognition of Ta-Seti appears in the inscriptions of King Nastasen, one of the last rulers of the Napatan period. In his coronation text, the god Amun of Napata is described as granting him kingship over Ta-Seti, indicating that the region remained conceptually integrated within Kushite royal authority until the end of the Napatan era.

=== Meroitic continuity ===
The continued use of the name Ta-Seti is also attested during the Meroitic period. Inscriptions of King Arnekhamani, carved on the walls of the Lion Temple at Musawwarat es-Sufra, identify the ruler as "King of Ta-Seti and King of the Two Lands." This titulary demonstrates that Ta-Seti remained a meaningful political and geographic designation within Kushite ideology into the Meroitic era.

Each nome was governed by a nomarch (provincial governor), who reported directly to the pharaoh. The size of Ta-Seti was approximately 5.5 hectares (2 cha-ta) in area and 112 kilometers (10.5 iteru) in length, likely referring to its extent along the Nile. The main city (Niwt) was Abu (Elephantine, modern Aswan), and other significant cities included Philae (P'aaleq), Syene (Sunet, modern Aswan), and Kom Ombo (Pa-Sebek). Each major city had a Het net (temple) dedicated to the chief deity and a Heqa het (nomarch's residence), reflecting the administrative and religious importance of these centers.

=== Debates on the end of Ta-Seti ===
The commonly cited termination of Ta-Seti around 3100 BCE is primarily based on the apparent disappearance of royal cemeteries associated with the region. However, some scholars argue that the absence of burial evidence does not necessarily indicate the political or cultural disappearance of Ta-Seti. Alternative explanations include changes in burial practices, territorial expansion, or the integration of Ta-Seti into broader Nubian and Egyptian political frameworks.

== Deities ==
The primary deity of Ta-Seti was Horus, with other major deities including Anuket, Arensnuphis, Hathor, Isis, Khnum, Mandulis, Satet, and Sobek. These deities reflect a blend of Egyptian and Nubian religious traditions. For instance, Anuket and Satet were particularly important due to their association with the Nile and its life-giving properties.[1] Heqaib, who was a nomarch of Ta-Seti, also appears to have been venerated after his death as a minor deity.[2] Several of these deities, particularly Anuket, Satet, Mandulis, and Arensnuphis, have strong associations with Nubia and were widely venerated in regions corresponding to present-day northern Sudan.

== 12th dynasty and Amenemhat I's Mother ==
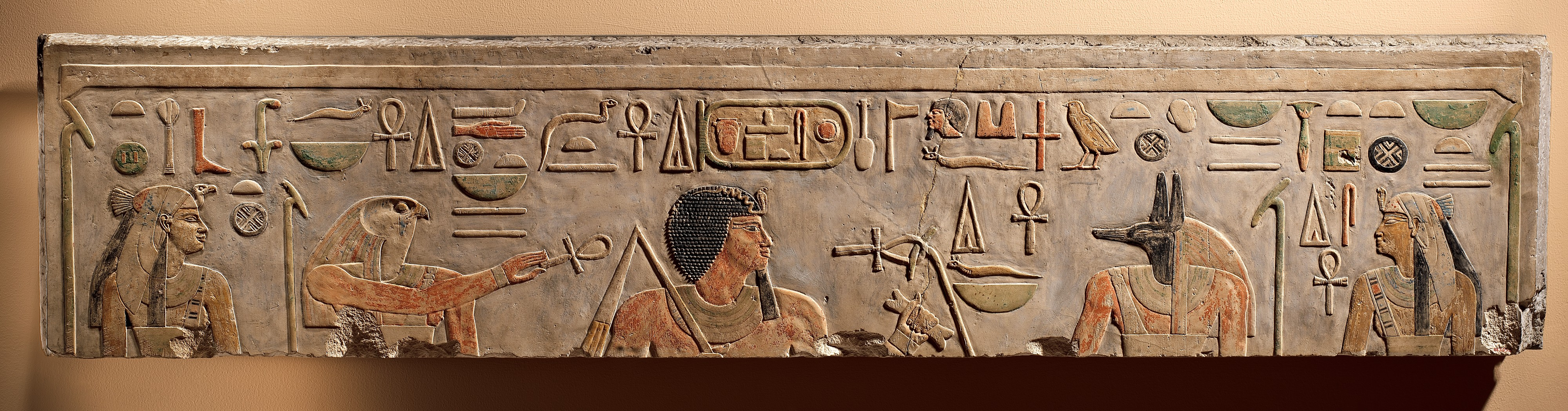
Lintel of Amenemhat I showing Amenemhat receiving blessings from Horus (left) and Anubis (right)

"The Prophecies of Neferti" has been interpreted as primary evidence to support the view that Amenemhat I had Nubian heritage as his mother is described as a "woman of Ta Seti", with origins in Aswan, the extreme southern region of Egypt.

In the view of Egyptologist Frank J. Yurco,

"The XIIth Dynasty (1991-1786 B.C.E.) originated from the Aswan region. As expected, strong Nubian features and dark coloring are seen in their sculpture and relief work. This dynasty ranks as among the greatest, whose fame far outlived its actual tenure on the throne."

Elephantine, identified with ancient Abu, functioned as a key interface between Egypt and Nubia and maintained sustained cultural, familial, and political connections with regions to the south. As part of the Ta-Seti region, Elephantine was closely linked to Nubian populations inhabiting areas corresponding to present-day northern Sudan, a context frequently cited by scholars when discussing Nubian influence within segments of the early Middle Kingdom elite.

Sudanese scholarship has further emphasized that references to Ta-Seti in Middle Kingdom texts should be understood within the broader historical continuity of Nubian regions south of the First Cataract, rather than as isolated geographic labels. This perspective situates Elephantine and Ta-Seti within a long-standing Sudanese and Nubian cultural landscape.

== Early Nubian Kingship and the Qustul Discovery Controversy ==
Three significant A-group culture cemeteries of the times of the First Dynasty of Egypt have been excavated, which is located in present-day Egypt what was once Lower Nubia at least 5800 years ago. The most important one, cemetery L, revealed wealthy burials of rulers. In one of these graves was found an incense burner believed by Bruce Williams of the Oriental Institute at the University of Chicago depicting images assigned to the Pharaoh including a shape of the White Crown of Upper Egypt.

Bruce Williams later clarified in 1987 that his discovery of the Qutsul incense burner advanced no claim of a Nubian origin or genesis for the pharaonic monarchy but that the archaeological data shows Nubian linkages and influence in helping to "fashion pharaonic civilization", including detailed excavations of the burial place of the Nubian rulers with date stamps well before the historical First Dynasty of Egypt. The size and wealth of the tombs were also described as vastly greater than that of the well-known Abydos tombs in Egypt.

Recent discoveries at Abydos in Upper Egypt have proven that the Egyptian monarchy predates the tombs at Qustul, and that the Qustul rulers probably adopted/emulated the symbols of Egyptian pharaohs. The archaeological cemeteries at Qustul are no longer available for excavations since the flooding of Lake Nasser.

In 2023, Christopher Ehret re-examined the archaeological findings of Bruce Williams. He argued that William’s findings were challenged at the time of discovery due to long-held assumptions of ancient Egypt “as somehow in but not of Africa”. Ehret cited recent work which revealed the Qustul state was more influential than initially suggested by Williams. Ehret also wrote that:

“The Qustul elite and ruler in the second half of the fourth millennium participated together with their counterparts in the communities of the Naqada culture of southern Egypt in creating the emerging culture and paraphernalia of pharaonic culture”.

== Nomarchs of Ta-Seti ==
The nomarchs of Ta-Seti administered a strategically important southern frontier region that was shaped by long-standing interaction between Egypt and Nubia. Their offices reflect the administrative incorporation of Ta-Seti within Egyptian governance while operating in a region with deep Nubian and Sudanese cultural roots.

The genealogy below lists nomarchs from the 12th Dynasty. The nomarchs are underlined. The exact relationships between these nomarchs are not fully known, and the genealogy is based on interpretations of inscriptions and historical records.

Sarenput I	Khema	Satethotep♀
Sarenput II	Shemai
Sat-tjeni♀
Heqaib III	Amenyseneb
