= Mibtahiah =

5th-century BC Egyptian businesswoman

Mibtahiah (476 BC - before 416 BC), was a Jewish businesswoman and banker. She belonged to the first Jewish women of which there is any information outside of the Bible, as well as the first of Jewish businesswomen. She is well-documented from the Ancient Aramaic papyrus collections from Elephantine in Egypt, known as the Mond-Cecil papyri in the Cairo Museum and the Bodleian papyri, which is also named the Mibtahiah archive after her.

Mibtahiah was the daughter of a businessman, Mahseiah, and may have had a sister named Miptahiah, as well as a nephew, the Jewish leader Jedaniah. Mibtahiah was married three times, and her marriages included 'prenuptial agreements' that safeguarded her wealth and property. One of her husbands was an Egyptian builder, Eshor (who later took the name Nathan), with whom she was a business partner. She inherited an estate from her father, which she grew throughout her life and business, leaving an inheritance to her own children.
