= Aswan Museum =

Museum in Elephantine, Aswan, Egypt

Coordinates: 24°05′5″N 32°53′12″E

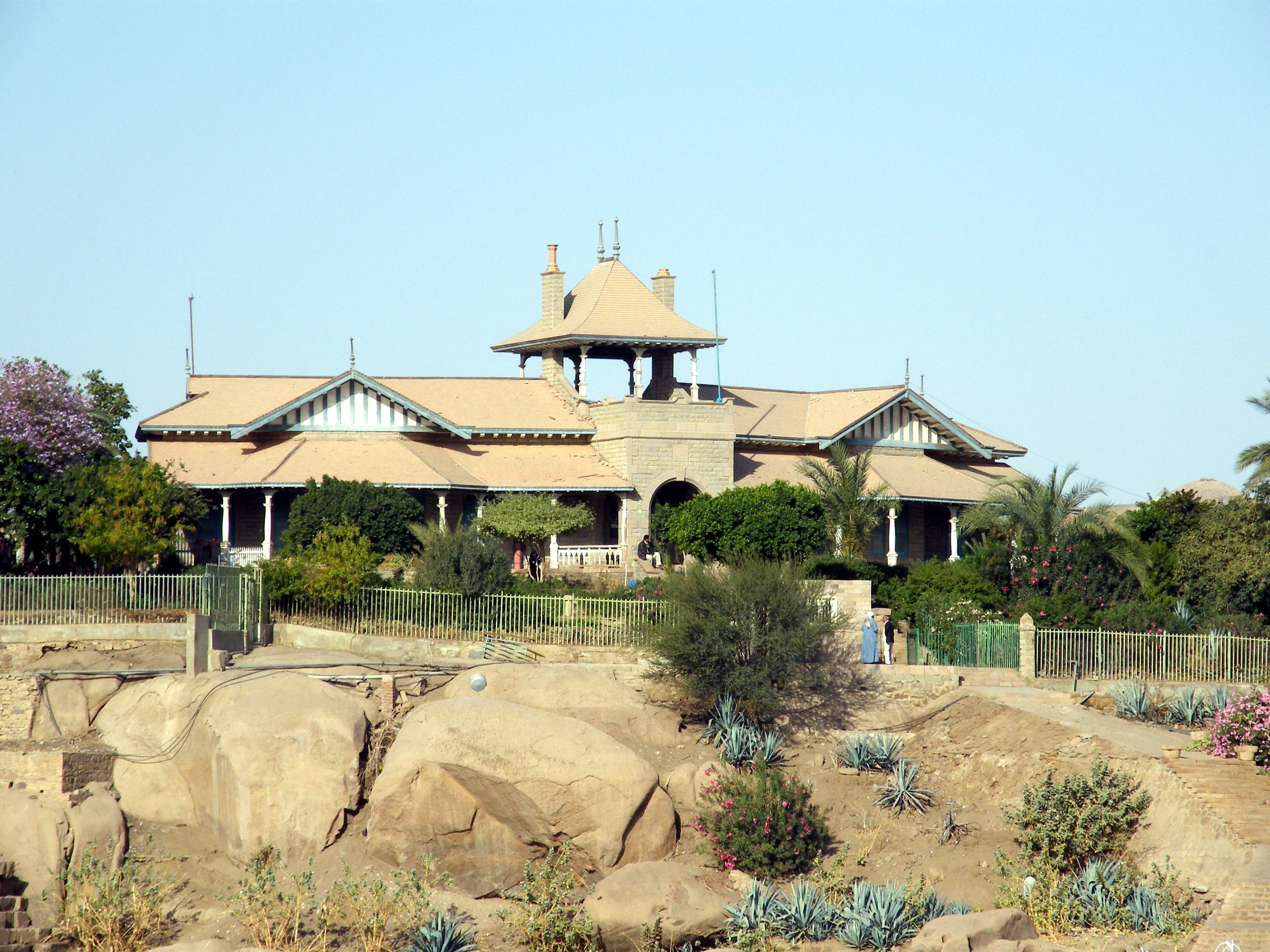
- Museum on the island of Elephantine, Aswan, Egypt
- Location: Aswan, Egypt.

Aswan Museum is a museum in Elephantine, located on the south-eastern side of Aswan, Egypt. It was set up in 1912 by the British Egyptologist Cecil Mallaby Firth. The museum features artifacts from Nubia, which were housed there during the construction of the Aswan Dam. In 1990, a new department was inaugurated. It displayed findings that were discovered on Elephantine island itself, such as utensils, weapons, pottery and mummies.

The museum is situated close to the Ruins of Abu, where excavations are still taking place.

== Museum contents ==
The museum includes many statues of kings and individuals, some mummies of the ram, the symbol of the god "Khnum", various types of pottery, architectural and decorative elements, a number of sarcophagi, tools of daily life, and some funerary paintings. In recent years, the German mission excavating in Elephantine, in cooperation with the Supreme Council of Antiquities, established an annex to the old museum located to the north of it and includes some of the antiquities that the mission found during its excavations that took place for many years on the island.

The museum also includes a garden, caves carved with rock carvings, minarets in the Islamic style, a Nubian house surrounded by a lake, the temple of the goddess Satet, the Temple of haqanaan ayb, and a Nilometer.

== Museum development ==
Between 1991 and 1993, a new annex was added to the Aswan Museum, called the Incs, located on Elften Island, about ten meters to the north of the Aswan Museum. The area of the museum annex is about 220 square meters and has 3 exhibition halls and a glass ceiling topped by a concrete roof and crowned in the central region in a hierarchical form. The German Archaeological Institute on Elephantine Island from 1969 until 1997.

After closing a period since the January 2011 revolution, the Minister of Antiquities decided to reopen the Aswan Museum on Elephantine Island again to foreign tourists, coinciding with the passage of 100 years since the establishment of the museum in 1917, and a major celebration on this occasion.

== Gallery ==
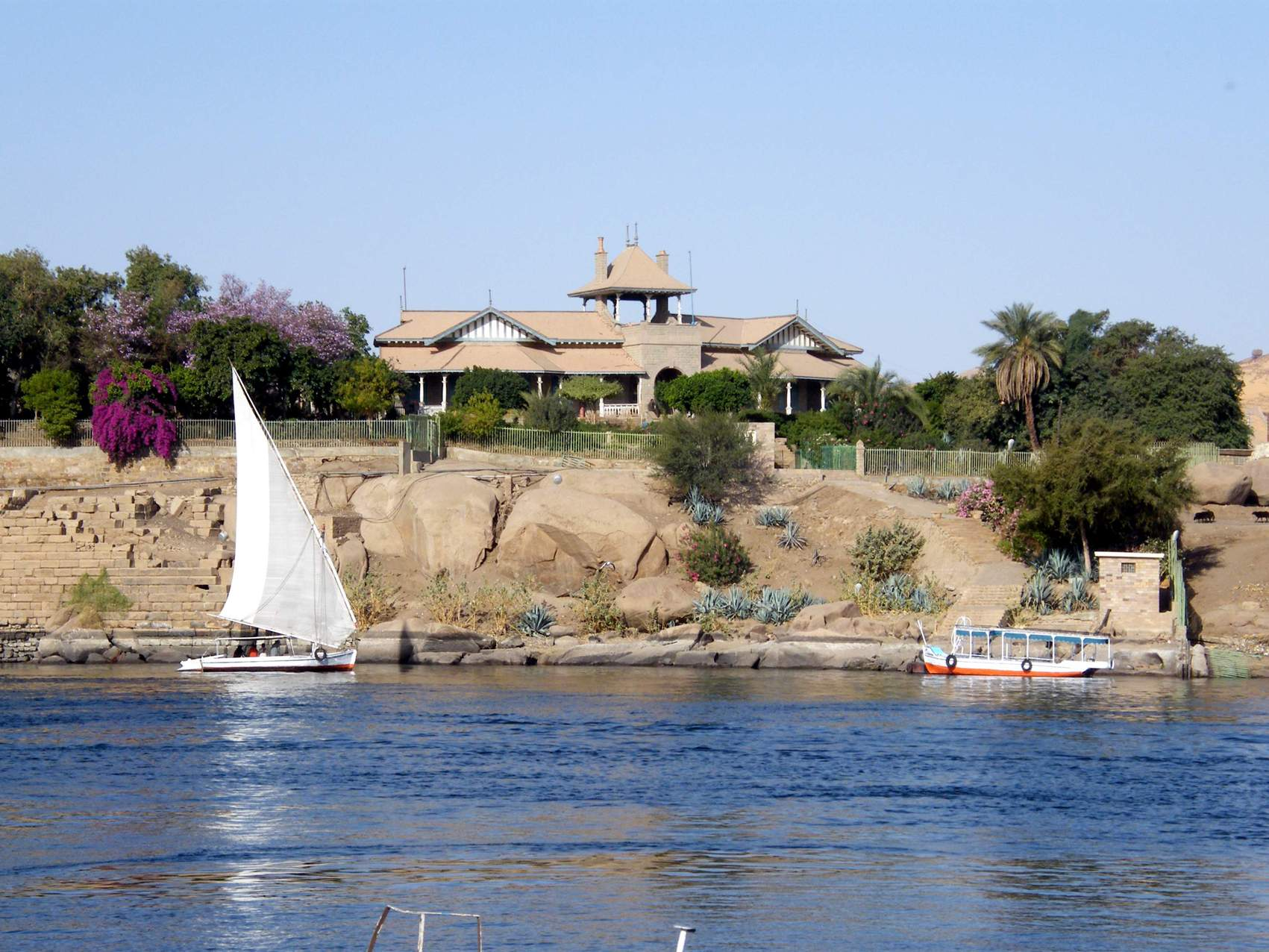

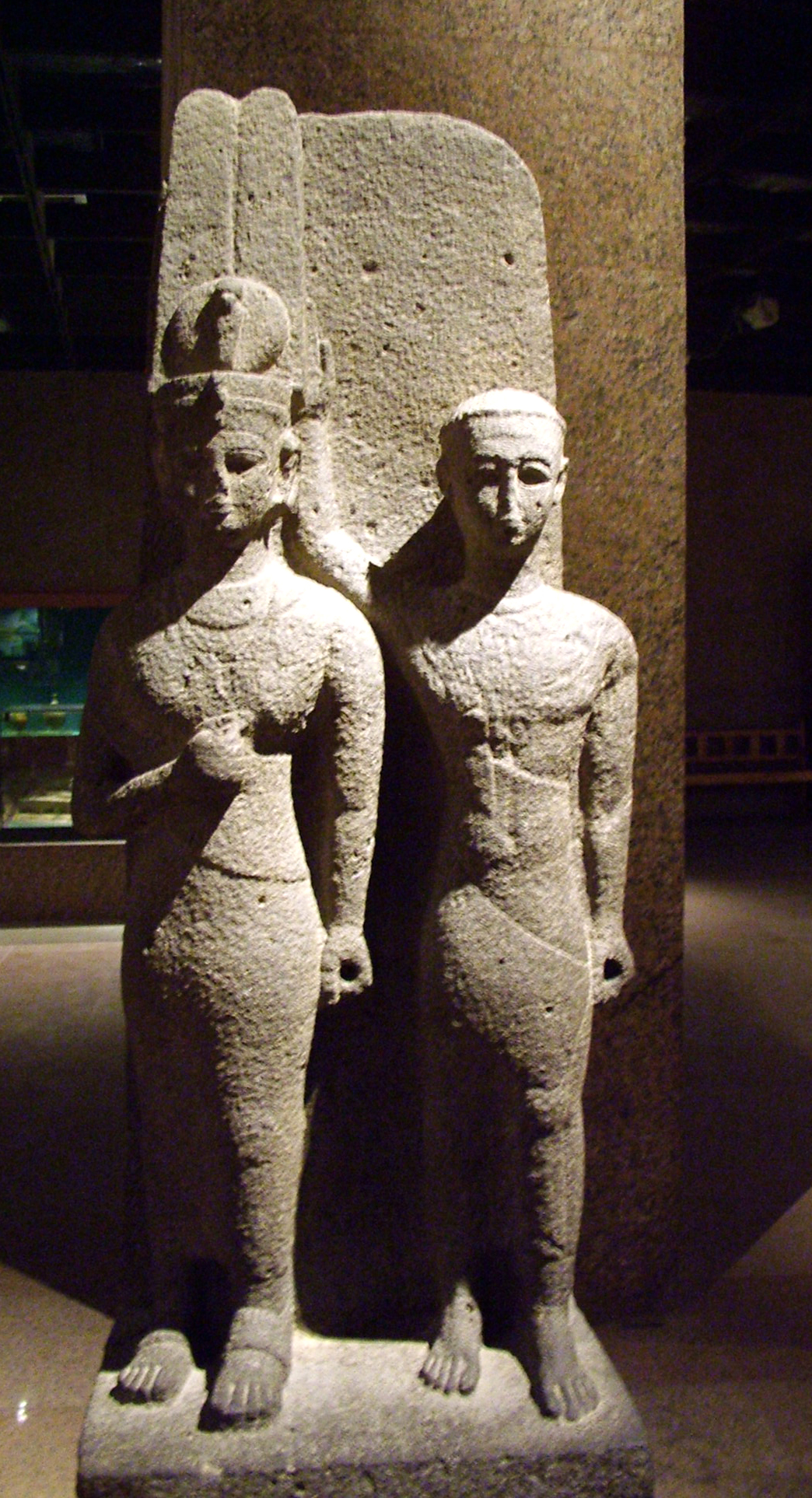

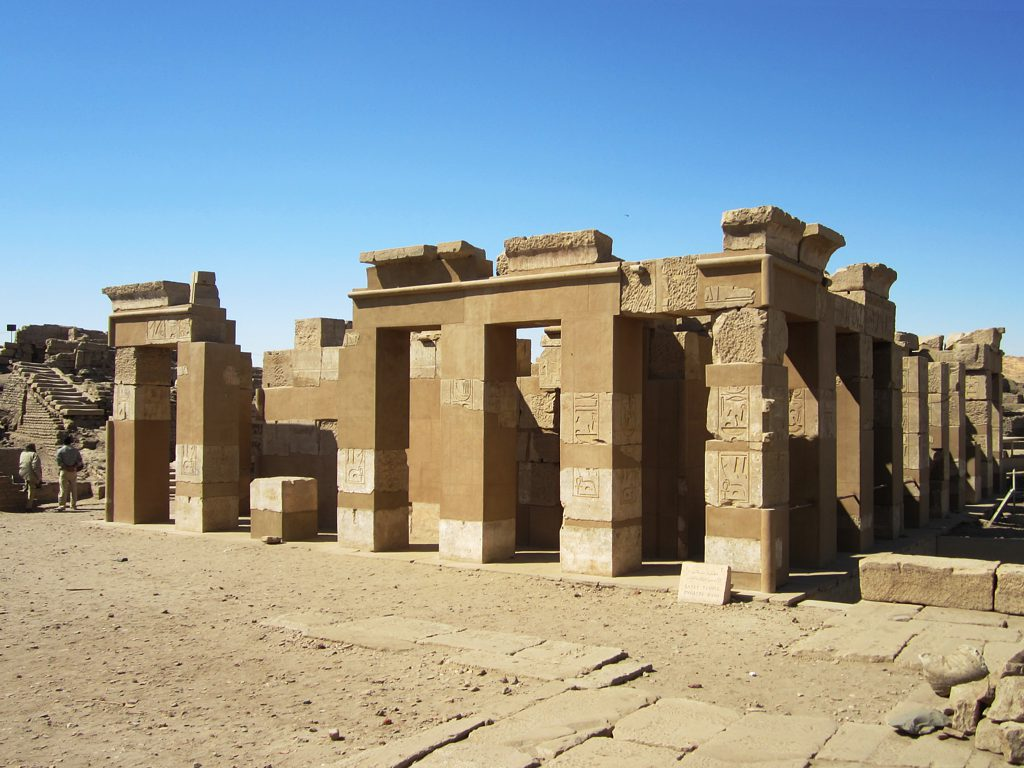

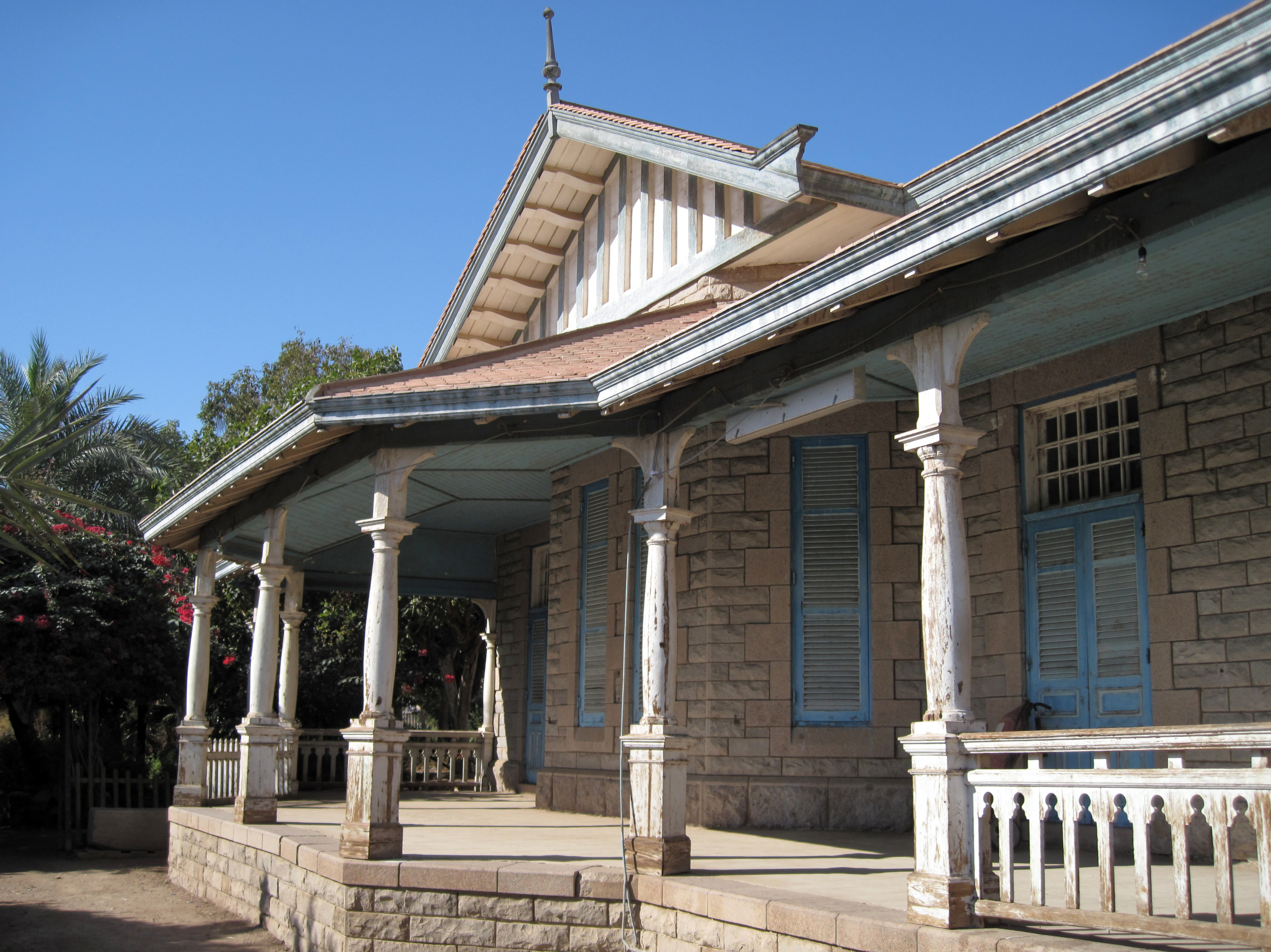

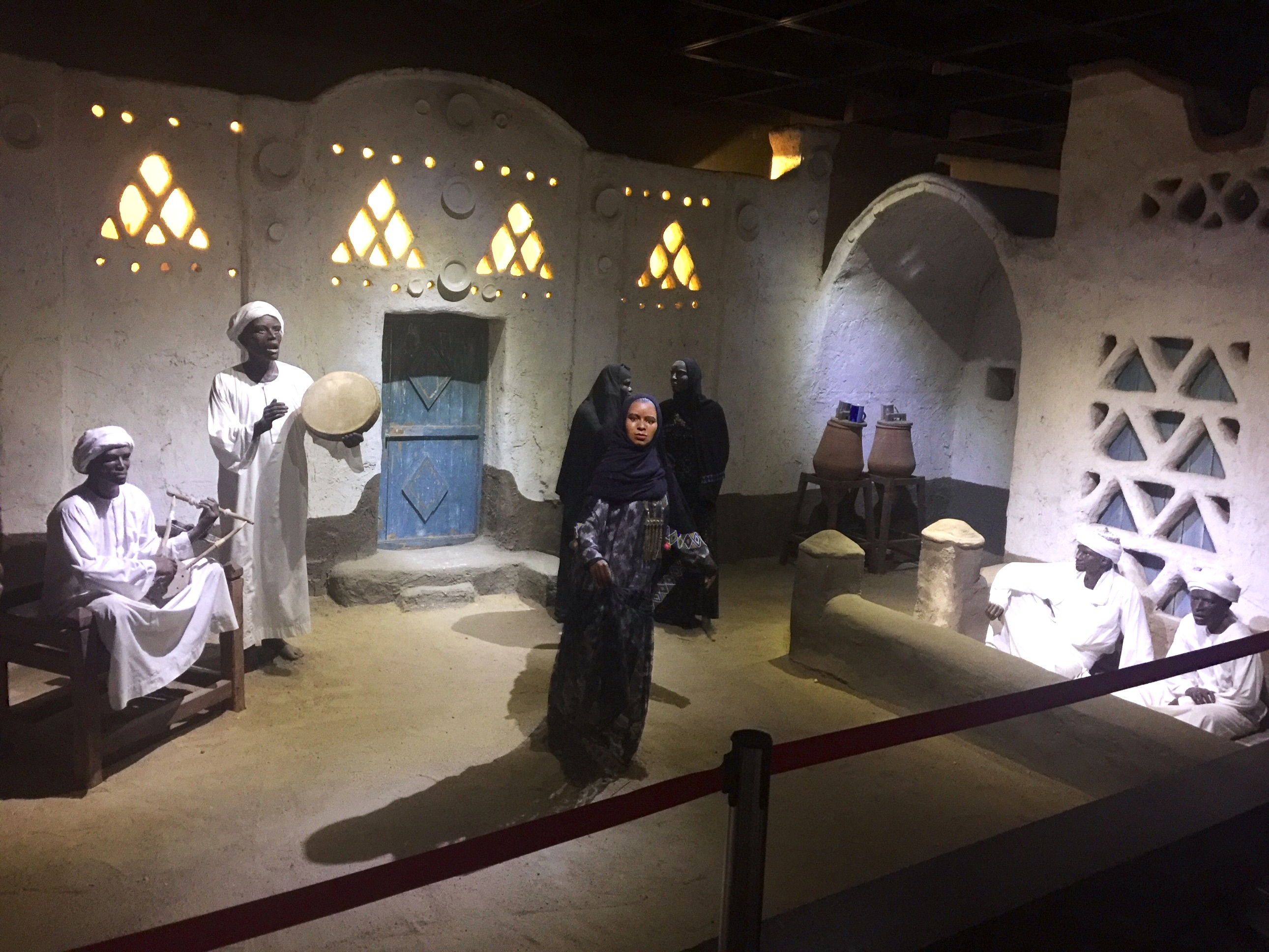

== See also ==
- List of museums in Egypt
