= Tel Arad =

Archaeological site west of the Dead Sea

- תל ערד (Hebrew) تل عراد (Arabic)
- Tell 'Arad
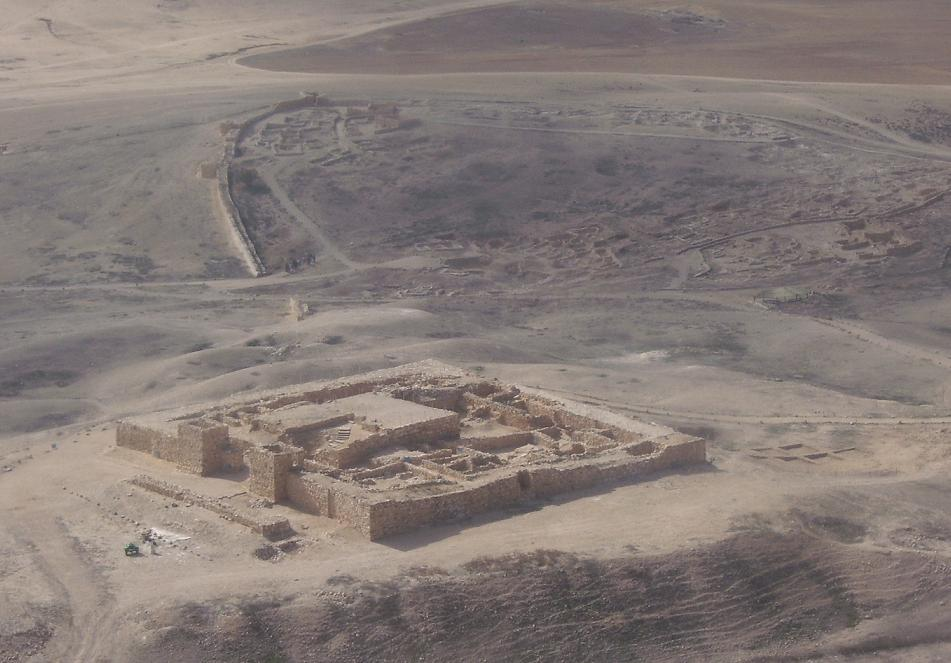
- Aerial view of the 9th-century BCE Israelite fortress

- Location within Israel
- 31°16′52″N 35°7′34″E
- Location: Israel
- Region: Negev

Site notes
- Archaeologists: Ruth Amiran (lower city), Yohanan Aharoni (fortress)
- Public access: National Park

Tel Arad (Hebrew: תל ערד) or Tell 'Arad (Arabic: تل عراد, romanized: Tall ʿArād) is an archaeological site consisting of a lower section and a tell or mound. It is located west of the Dead Sea, about 10 kilometres (6 miles) west of the Israeli city of Arad in an area surrounded by mountain ridges which is known as the Arad Plain. The site is about 10.1 ha (25 acres) in size.

The site comprises two parts: an early settlement on lower ground and a Judahite fortress and settlement on a hill. The early settlement was inhabited from the early 4th to the mid 3rd millennium BC then after a 1500 year hiatus, the Judahite habitation was established in the 10th century BCE and continued until 135 CE during the Bar Kokhba revolt. After a period of abandonment, the settlement was reinhabited in the 7th century CE during the Early Muslim period and was used for approximately two centuries.

The lower and upper sites are part of the Tel Arad National Park, which has undertaken projects to restore the upper and lower sites and opened them to the public. Tel Arad has been excavated in the 20th and 21st centuries.

== Proposed identification ==
It was first identified in modern literature in 1841 by Edward Robinson in his Biblical Researches in Palestine, on account of the similarity of the Arabic place name, Tell 'Arad, with the Arad in the Book of Joshua.

Historical geographer Yoel Elitzur says that although the site remained uninhabited for the last 1,100 years, the name has endured, preserved by nomads.

=== Not the site of Canaanite Arad ===
The lack of Middle and Late Bronze Age remains seems to invalidate the identification with biblical, i.e. Canaanite Arad. On the other hand, the two Hebrew ostraca containing the name Arad confirm the site as being the Iron Age, i.e. Israelite Arad. One theory trying to solve the problem suggests that "the Negev of Arad" was only the name of the surrounding region at the time, with no city in existence. A second theory places Canaanite Arad at Tel Malhata, 8 mi (13 km) southwest of Tel Arad, where archaeologists found substantial Middle Bronze Age fortifications. An argument in favour of the latter theory is Pharaoh Sheshonk's list of captured cities, with one "Arad the House of YRHM", possibly at Tel Arad and referring to the settling there of Jerahmeelite families, and another "Great Arad" (possibly Tel Malhata) towering over the "Negev of Arad".

== Location: geography, roads, water ==
Tel Arad is positioned on the northern edge of the southern Israeli Beersheba–Arad Valley, defined by scholars as "the eastern (biblical) Negev", the Hebrew Bible using the term Negev only for the northern part of the region known today by that name.

This east-west oriented valley was a convenient route for caravans during periods of sustained commercial activity.

The water supply was first ensured by a system of harvesting rainwater and its runoff built during the Early Bronze Age, and later by a well; archaeologists disagree on whether the well was already dug by the Early Bronze Age settlers or only during the Iron Age.

== History ==
=== Chalcolithic: open settlement ===
Stratum V: The site is divided into a lower section and an upper section on a hill. In the Late Chalcolithic (c. 4000 BCE), the lower section was settled for the first time. It was an open settlement, i.e., lacking fortifications.

=== Early Bronze Age ===
For the subdivisions of the Bronze Age, see here, and for an overview for this region here.

In the Early Bronze Age (EBA), Tel Arad (Strata IV-I) was occupied in the EBA I–II and took part in the Beersheba Valley copper trade. In general Tel Arad lies in a drier region where frequencies of human activity depended upon oscillations toward wetter climate conditions.

==== Early Bronze IB ====
The Early Bronze IB (EB IB, c. 3300/3200–3050/3000 BCE) saw the Stratum IV city flourishing. There was an amount of Egyptian pottery found indicating trade.

Climate. The Southern Levant during the EB IB was dominated by very humid climate conditions. In the northern part of the Southern Levant there were higher levels of arboreal Mediterranean tree pollen and olive pollen. This was a proto-urban period where settlements spread and population grew, also spreading human activity into the Negev region.

==== Early Bronze II ====
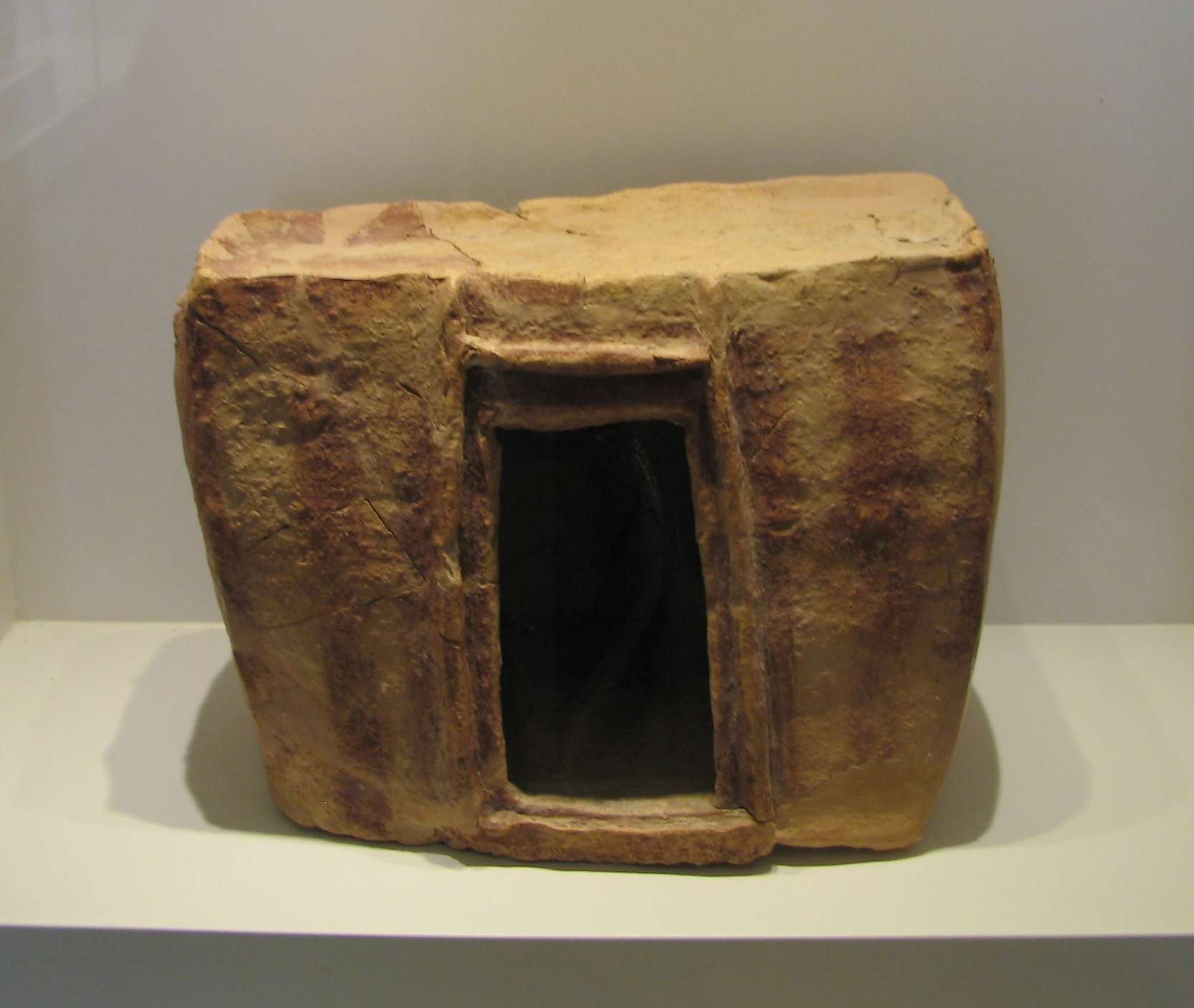
Ceramic model of a house of the broadroom "Arad house" type, Tel Arad, c. 3,000–2,650 BCE. Israel Museum, Jerusalem.

In Early Bronze II (c. 3050/3000–2750/2700 BCE) Arad was a large fortified city, with rich remains contained in Stratum III (EB IIA) and II (EB IIB).

- Stratum III (EB IIA) was an urban town with city wall, palace, sacred precinct, public buildings, and reservoir. It was destroyed around 2800 BCE.
- Stratum II (EB IIB) saw Tel Arad quickly rebuilt. The material culture was the same as Stratum III.

==== Early Bronze III ====
The Early Bronze III (c. 2750–2350 BCE) saw Arad abandoned. This may have been associated with the rise of central trading sites in the Negev Highlands related to the copper industry in the Arabah and trade towards Egypt in the Old Kingdom.

- Stratum I: a sparse settlement in the ruins of the city of Stratum II. Abandoned by around 2650 BCE.

=== Iron Age ===
Herzog's 2002 interim report adopts the now better accepted "low chronology", lowering by a century most of the dates previously proposed for the Iron Age by adherents of the "biblical archaeology" approach: this is also the base chosen here for this section.

With the Late Bronze Age collapse, the fall of the Egyptian New Kingdom during the 20th Dynasty saw its control over polities in the Southern Levant decline.

After a 1,500-years-long period of abandonement, the northeastern hill, the highest elevation on the margin of the destroyed Bronze Age city, was settled again during the 10th-9th centuries BCE (Iron Age IIA). The village there made use of broadroom Bronze Age house remains, while also building new dwellings.

In the 9th century BCE, after the apparent evacuation of the villagers, a fortress was built on the mound. It went through a cycle of destruction and - as it seems - immediate reconstruction totalling six phases over a timeframe of 260 years, until the early 6th century BCE, until the time when Judah was crushed by the Babylonians.

Aharoni, thoroughly updated by Herzog, distinguished 13 occupation strata on the "fortress mound":

- Stratum XIII (mid-3rd millennium BCE): poorly preserved Early Bronze Age city remains
- Stratum XII (Iron Age IIA-IIB, 10th-9th centuries BCE): probably a site used by pastoral nomads, turning into a small village of the permanent "enclosed settlement" type
- Strata XI-VI (Iron Age IIB-IIC, 9th-6th centuries BCE), during the Kingdom of Judah): a fortress going through six (re)construction phases
- Strata V–III: forts from the Persian, Hellenistic and Roman periods, preserving the military purpose of the site

The ancient settlement period was again interrupted, with two more strata to follow much later:

- Stratum II (Early Muslim period): a waystation, which continues the defensive tradition of the earlier fortresses
- Stratum I: Bedouin burial site used during the Late Arab period of the last millennium

==== Iron Age II village ====
The site was resettled in the second half of the 10th - first half of 9th century BCE by a small number of people, c. 80–100, the Stratum XII village eventually taking the shape of an oval "enclosed settlement" with 20 to 25 dwellings set wall to wall around a courtyard probably serving as a sheep pen. The enclosure only had one exit on the east, toward the depression in the earlier "Lower City" which again served for collecting water. Herzog, writing in 2002, categorically distances himself from earlier interpretations which were motivated by a literal acceptance of the biblical narrative down to its details, typical for the "biblical archaeology" approach practiced until the 1980s, and refutes with thorough arguments the existence of any ritual site at this early date.

==== Iron Age II Judahite fortress; temple, ostraca, reservoir ====
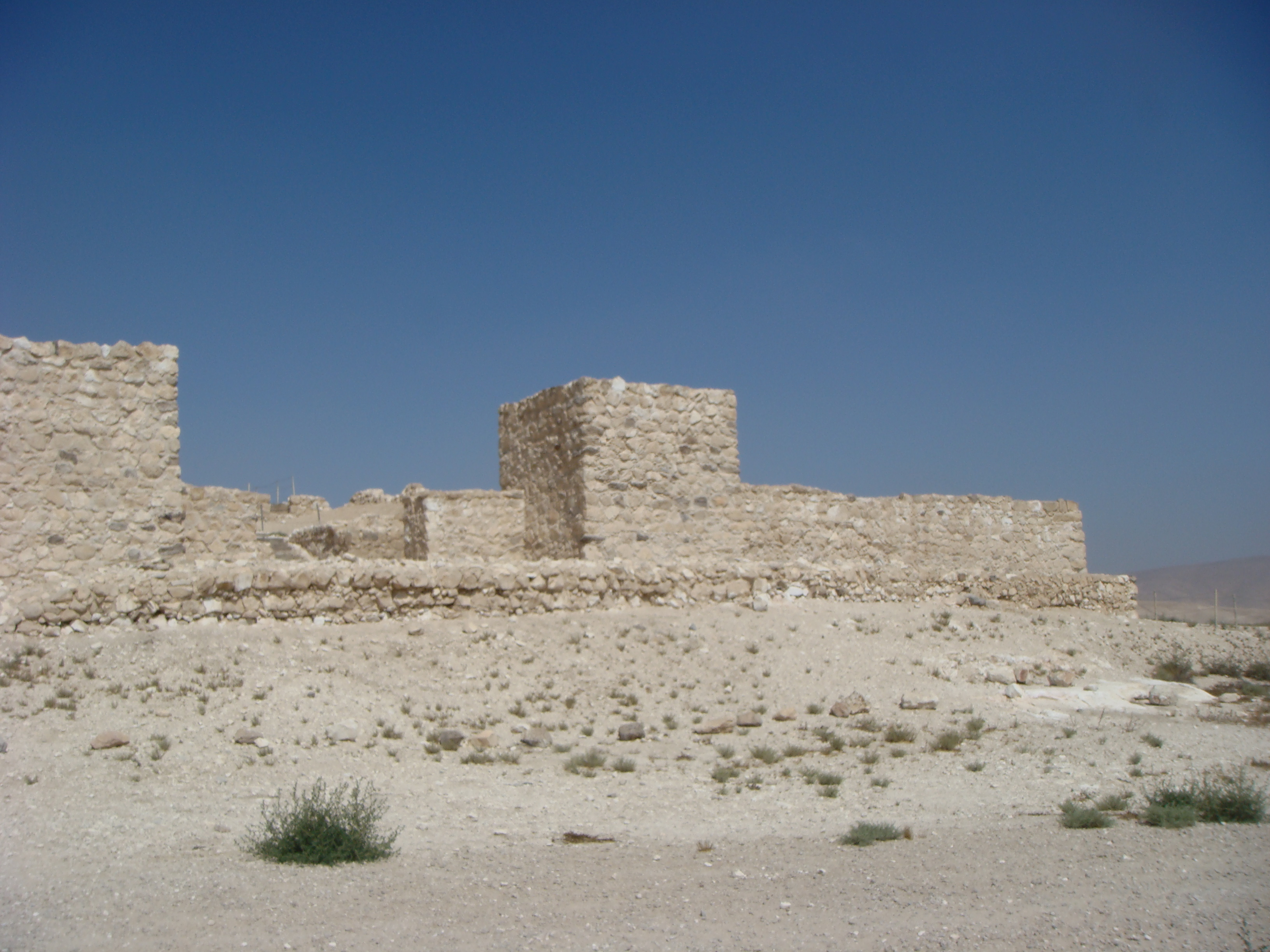
Stratum X gate of Arad Fortress

Tel Arad became a fortified stronghold of the Kingdom of Judah.

- Stratum XI: A Judahite casemate fortress is built (2nd half of 9th century BCE), the first in a series of six.
- Stratum X: The fortress sees improvements with solid walls and a towering gate (mid-8th century BCE).
- Stratum IX: 2nd half of 8th century BCE.
- Stratum VIII (2nd half of 8th c.): A short-lived stratum ending with the destruction caused by Sennacherib in 701 BCE.
- Stratum VII: At the end of the 7th century BCE, Edomites might have destroyed the fortress.
- Stratum VI (late 7th - early 6th c. BCE): The last Judahite fortress destroyed by the Babylonians in 586 BCE.

Ostraca

Between 1962 and 1964, some 200 ostraca (inscribed pottery sherds) were excavated. 107 of them are in ancient Hebrew, written using the Paleo-Hebrew alphabet and dated to circa 600 BCE (Stratum VI). Of the ostraca dated to later periods, the bulk are written in Aramaic and a few in Greek and Arabic. Most of the Hebrew ostraca consist of everyday military correspondence between the commanders of the fort and are addressed to Eliashib, thought to be the fort's quartermaster. One ostracon mentions a "house of YHWH", which some scholars believe is a reference to the Jerusalem temple. With them was found a partial ostracon inscribed in hieratic Egyptian script, similarly dated. The supplies listed included south-Egyptian barley and animal fats (vs the wheat and olive oil in the Hebrew ostraca). In 1967 an ostracon was found with text written in a combination of intermingled hieratic and Hebrew-Phoenician signary, without being a bilingual text .

Temple

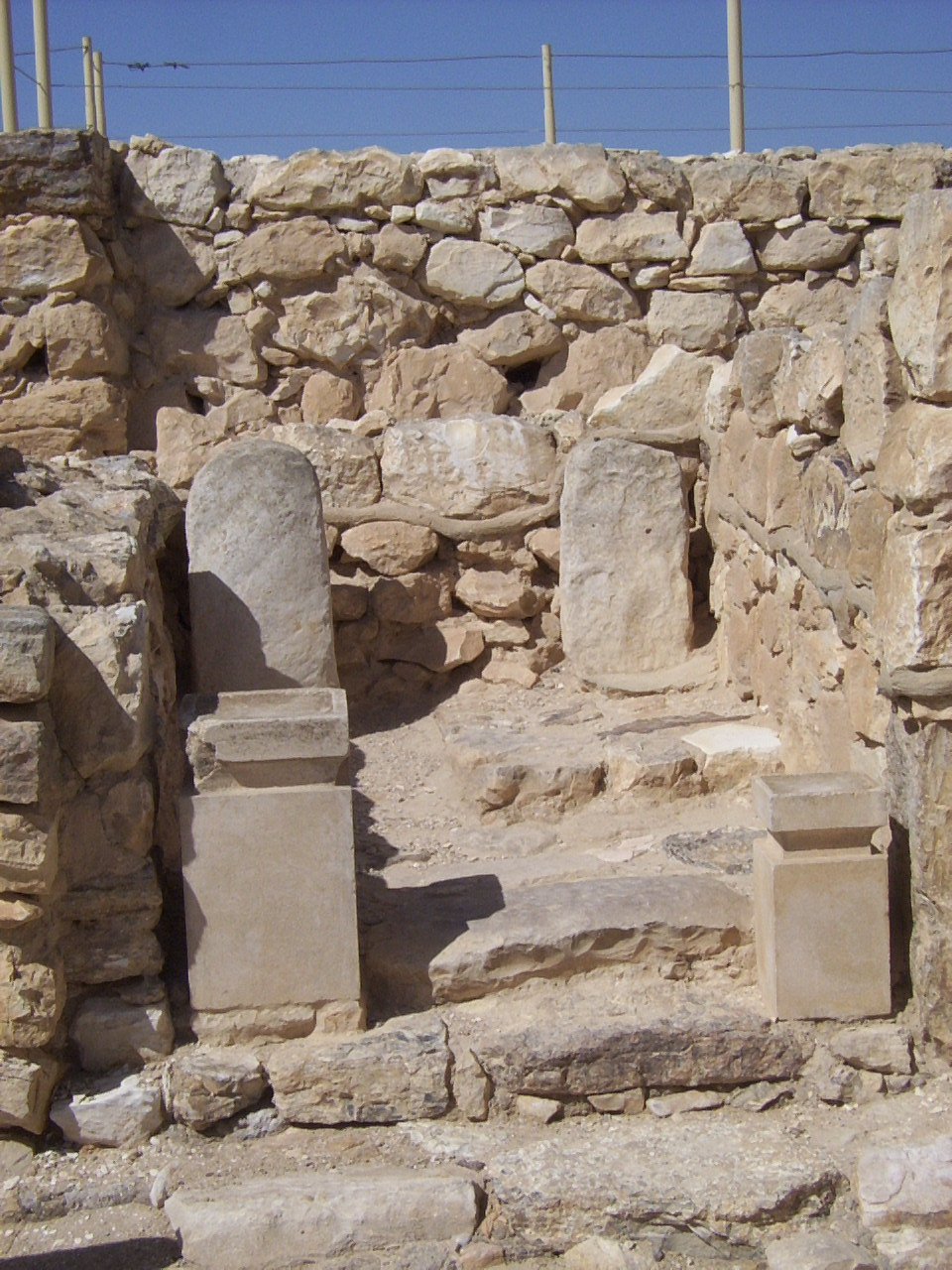
Holy of Holies of temple, with two incense pillars and two stele, one dedicated to Yahweh, and one most likely to Asherah

The Tel Arad temple was uncovered by archaeologist Yohanan Aharoni during the first excavation season in 1962. He spent the rest of his life investigating it, and died prematurely in 1976 before publishing the excavation results.

In the Holy of Holies of this temple two incense altars and two possible stele or massebot or standing stones were found.

Unidentified dark material preserved on the upper surface of the two altars was submitted for organic residue analysis, with several cannabis derivates being detected on the smaller altar: THC, CBD, and CBN. The residue on the large altar contained many chemicals associated with frankincense. While the use of frankincense for cultic purposes is well-known, the presence of cannabis was novel, if not shocking. It represents the "first known evidence of hallucinogenic substance found in the Kingdom of Judah." It has also been noted that hemp cloth is extremely rare in the Iron Age Levant, the only occurrence in an archaeological context being a piece of very fine hemp textile found on a loom at a site further up north in the Jordan Valley, in a probably cultic complex containing the Deir Alla inscription, where it is thought to have been woven for the goddess Shagar. The complex most likely dates to the 2nd half of the 9th century BCE, being destroyed by an earthquake around 800 BCE.

The Reservoir

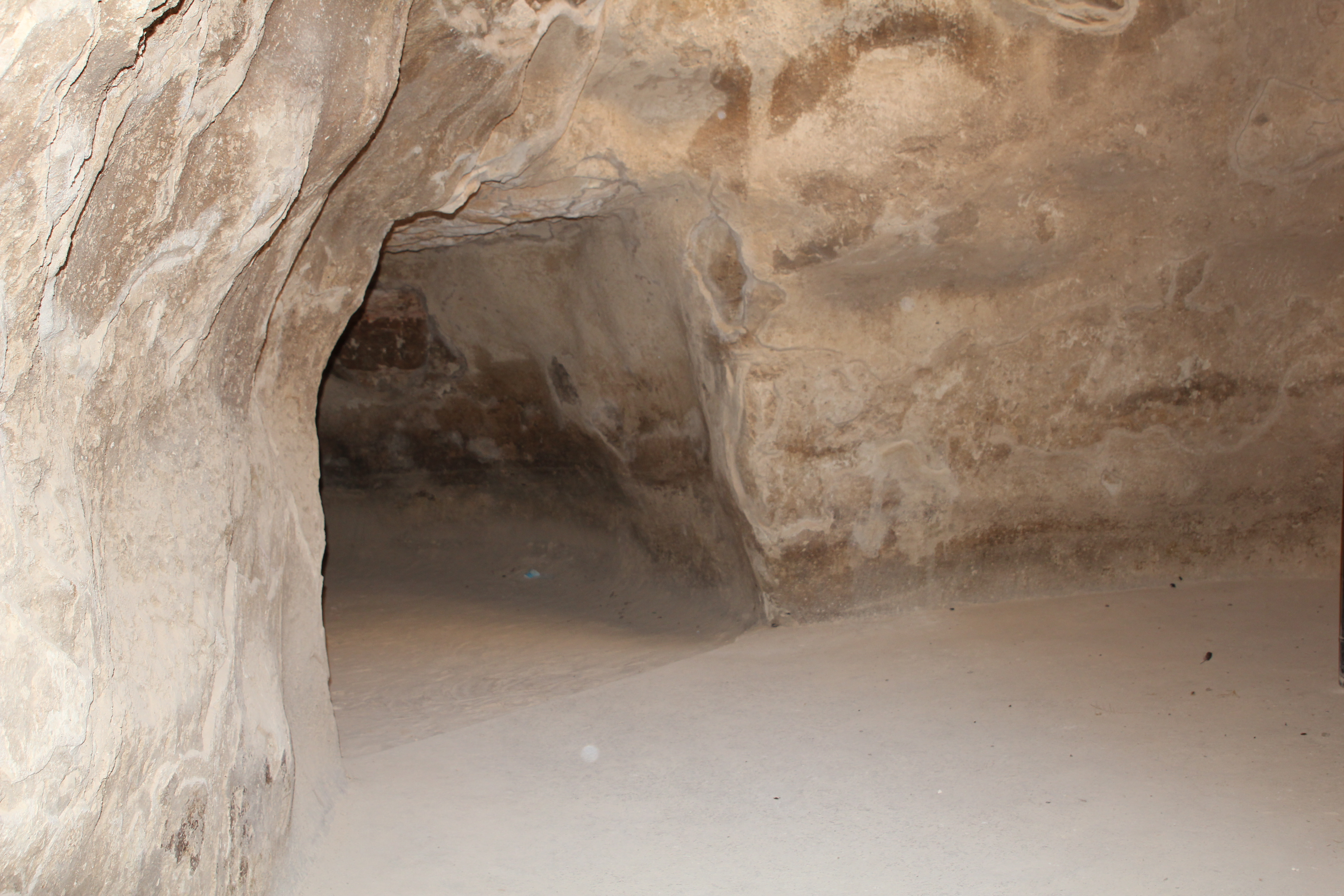
The Arad fortress reservoir hewn and utilized during the 9th and 8th C BCE in the Kingdom of Judah.

This 10-meter-deep reservoir was carved out of the rock beneath the temple courtyard. It has a volume of about 400 cubic meters. It is divided into two chambers, each of which has layers of plaster on its walls. The first chamber is vast and has a tiny room. The medium-sized second chamber has a plastered staircase that offers easy access for maintenance and water draws. The water was meant to be used by the fort's occupants both during peacetime and during a siege. and was employed in temple ceremonies as well. The reservoir was utilized during the eighth and ninth centuries.

=== Persian period ===
Stratum V: The settlement belonging to the Persian period.

=== Hellenistic and Roman periods: citadels ===
Stratum IV (Hellenistic): It is believed that several citadels were built one upon the other and existed in the Hellenistic and Roman periods.

Herod even reconstructed the lower city for the purpose of making bread. The site lasted until the end of the Bar Kokhba revolt 135 CE.

=== Muslim conquest to Abbasid period ===
Tel Arad lay in ruins for 500 years until the Early Muslim period, when the former Roman citadel was rebuilt and remodeled by some prosperous clan in the area and functioned for 200 years until around 861, when there was a breakdown of central authority and a period of widespread rebellion and unrest. The citadel was destroyed and no more structures were built on the site.

== Excavations ==
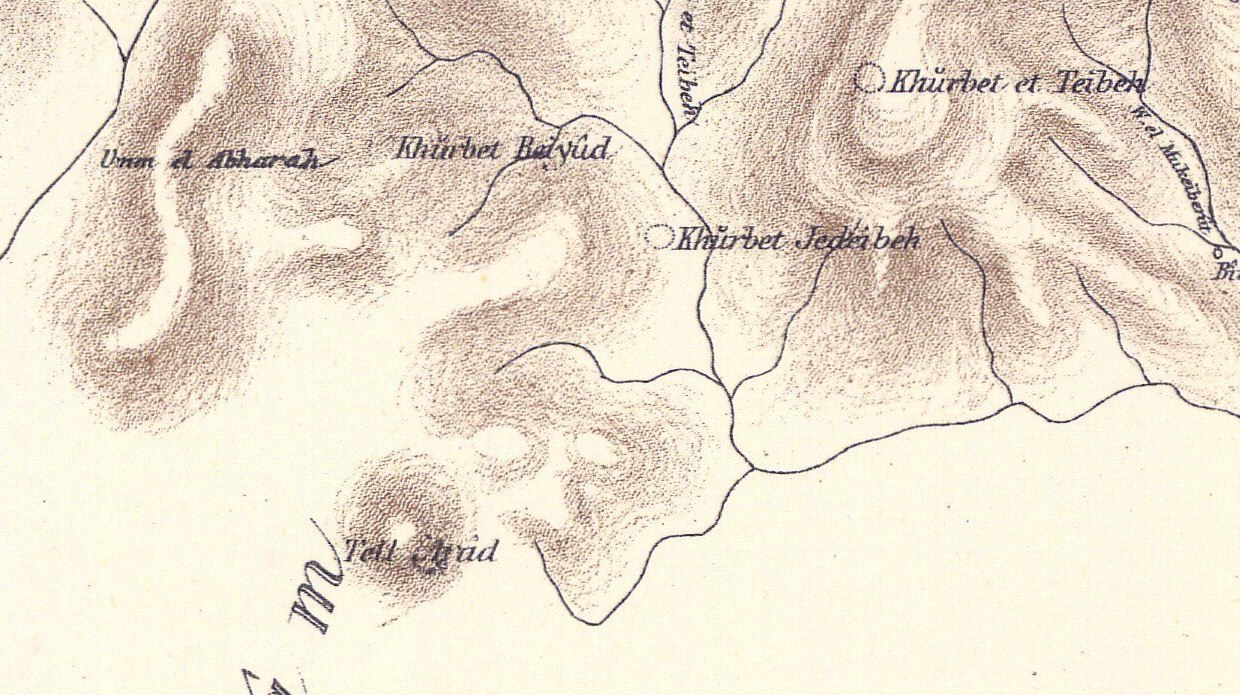
Tell Arad in the PEF Survey of Western Palestine, 1880

Tel Arad was excavated during 18 seasons, first between 1962 and 1967, with further excavations lasting until 1984, the lower area by Ruth Amiran and the mound by Yohanan Aharoni. Due to Y. Aharoni's premature death, the final report for that excavation was still in progress as of 2022. An additional 8 seasons were done on the Iron Age water system.

== See also ==
- Archaeology of Israel
- Cities of the ancient Near East
- Tourism in Israel
- Tel Arad, Israel, unrecognized Bedouin village near the ancient site
