= House of Yahweh (biblical term) =

Phrase found in the Hebrew Bible

"House of Yahweh" or "House of YHWH" (Hebrew: בֵּית יהוה Bēt YHWH) is a phrase found throughout the Hebrew Bible, and on at least one extrabiblical inscription. Numerous "houses of God" are mentioned in the text of the Tanakh, and they did not always represent a physical structure – however, in the context of the "House of Yahweh", the phrase is primarily taken to refer to a temple dedicated to the worship of Yahweh.

== Jerusalem ==
Most modern religious scholars focus primarily upon Solomon's Temple, the First Temple in Jerusalem. However, there have been two other structures identified as "a House of Yahweh." One is located in Elephantine, Egypt; the other structure is a temple at Tel Arad.

== New Testament ==
The New Testament refers to the phrase "house of God" in Mark 2:26; Luke 6:4; 1 Timothy 3:15; Hebrews 10:21; and 1 Peter 4:17. Jesus quotes Isaiah 56:7 – "… My house shall be called a house of prayer for all nations" (NKJV) – in Matthew 21:13; Mark 11:17; and Luke 19:46.

== Tel Arad ==
In 1962 Yohanan Aharoni excavated a Judean temple at Tel Arad. The incense altars and two "standing stones" may have been dedicated to Yahweh and Asherah. An inscribed pottery shard found at the site, known as Ostracon 18, mentions a "House of YHWH," which scholars suggest may reference the temple at Arad or the Temple in Jerusalem.

== Elephantine ==
See Elephantine: Jewish temple.
