= Arad ostraca =

Collection of more than 100 inscribed pottery shards

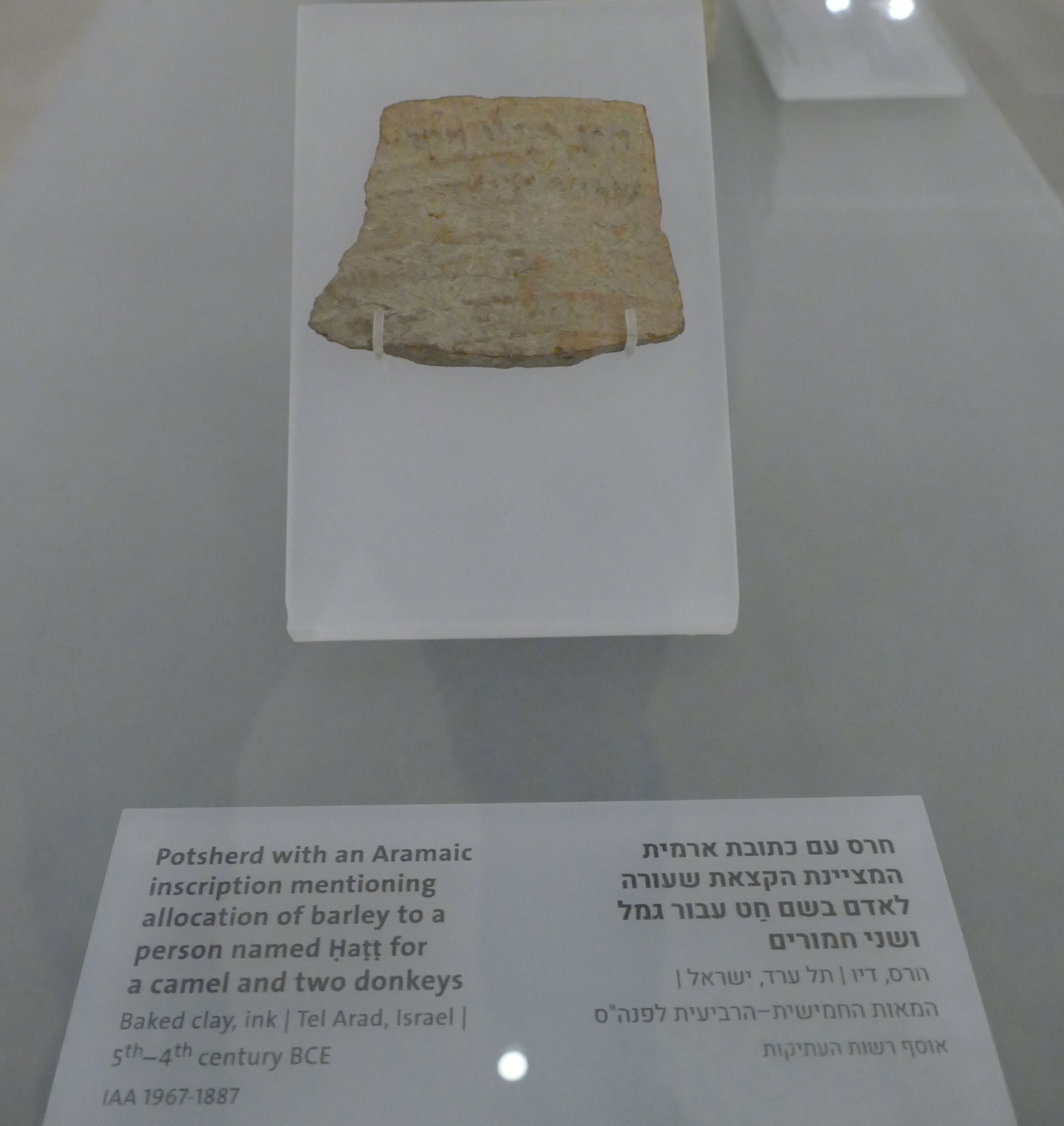
Arad ostracon

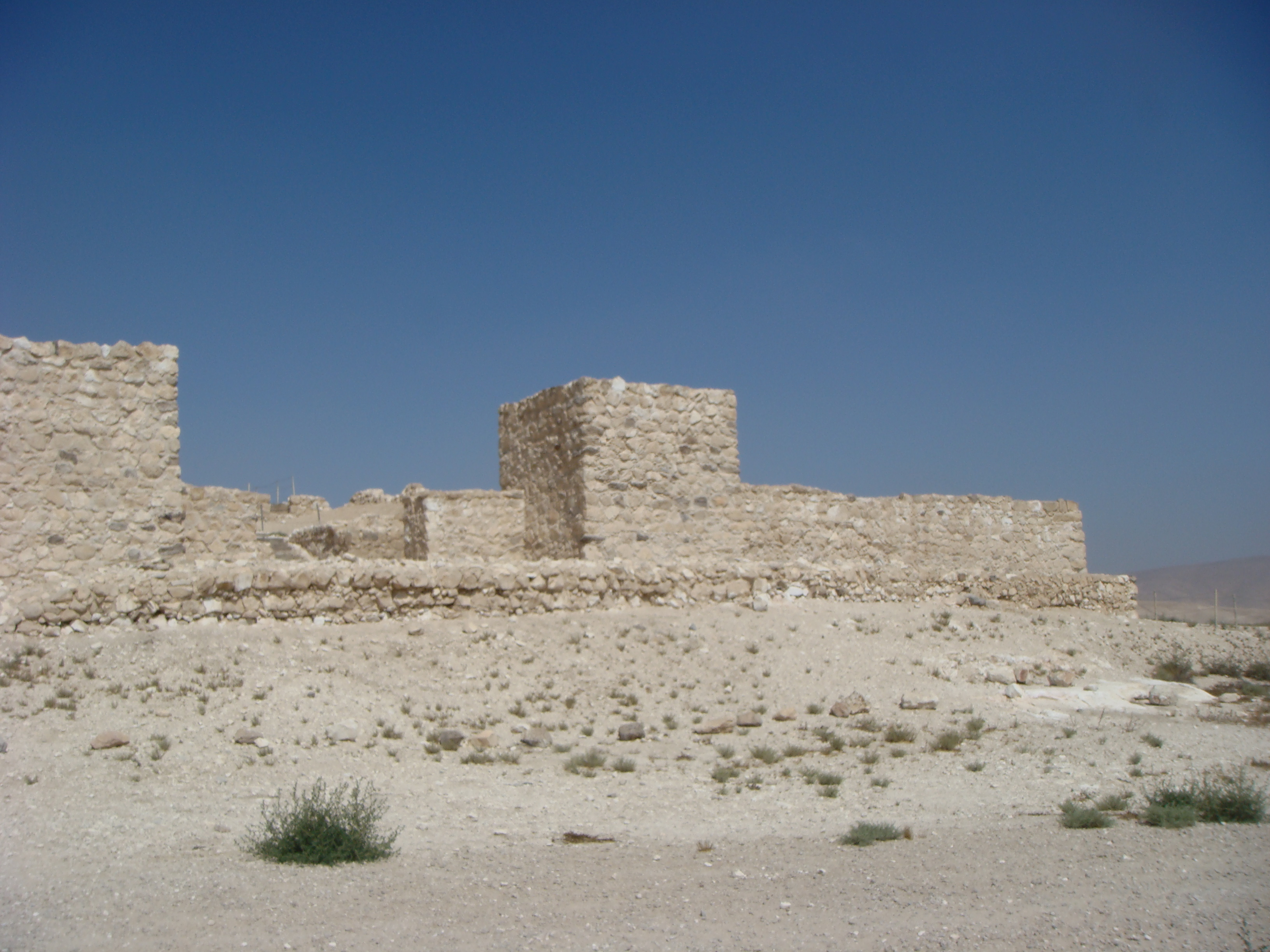
Ruins of the fort in Arad.

The Arad ostraca, also known as the Eliashib Archive, is a collection of more than 200 inscribed pottery shards (also known as sherds or potsherds) found at Tel Arad in the 1960s by archeologist Yohanan Aharoni. Arad was an Iron Age fort at the southern outskirts of the Kingdom of Judah, close to Beersheba in modern Israel.

One hundred and seven of the ostraca are written in the Paleo-Hebrew alphabet and dated to circa 600 BCE. Of the ostraca dated to later periods, the bulk are written in Aramaic and a few in Greek and Arabic.

The majority of the Hebrew ostraca are lists of names and administrative letters to the commanders of the fort; everyday correspondence between military supply masters, requests for supplies, and so on. Most of them are addressed to Eliashib (also transliterated Elyashiv; not to be confused with the biblical high priest Eliashib), thought to be the quartermaster of Arad.

Eighteen ostraca consisting mainly of letters addressed to Eliashib were found in a chamber of the casemate wall of the fort. These are known as the Eliashib Archive.

== Literacy rate ==
In 2020, an algorithmic handwriting study revealed that the Arad ostraca must have had at least twelve different authors, of which 4–7 were stationed at Arad. Since Arad's garrison is estimated to only about 20–30 soldiers, the result supports a high literacy rate for the Judahite military and administrative apparatuses during this period. The author of the study suggested that the high literacy rate could mean that some Biblical texts could possibly have been written before the Babylonian conquest of Judah.

== Sherds ==
=== Ostracon 1 ===
ʾl ʾlyšb w-	To Eliashib: And
ʿt ntn lktym	now, give to the Kittim
yyn b(tm) 3 w-	three ba(ths) of wine, and
ktb šm hym	write the name of the day.
wmʿwd hqmḥ	And from the remainder of
hrʾšn t-	the first flour you will de-
rkb ⊢ 1 qmḥ	liver one measure of flour
lʿšt lhm l-	for them to make b-
ḥm myyn	read. Of the wine
hʾgnt ttn	from the mixing bowls, you will give (them some).

The Kittim were Greek mercenaries, probably from Cyprus and the Aegean islands, employed by Judah to defend the southern frontier.

=== Ostracon 3 ===
Nadav Na'aman translates the text as follows:

To Eliashib: And now, give from the wine 3 bath-jars, for Hananiah commands you to Beersheba with a load of a pair of donkeys. And you shall pack with them dough or [br]ea[d]. Calculate (the amount of) the wheat and the bread and take for yourself from [the store?].

Na'aman has also deciphered and translated the reverse side of the ostracon as follows:

To you. And [PN^{?}] will curse^{??} [them^{?}] concerning your^{?} Cat[t]le^{??}, for [they^{?}] have turned their back.

=== Ostracon 7 ===
Seems to refer to Eliashib offering presents for the Kittim on the eve of the celebration of the day of the new moon.

=== Ostracon 16 ===
The ostracon is inscribed both on the front and on the back (recto and verso). The frontside reads:

ʾhbk ḥnnyhw šlḥ lšl-	Your friend, Hananiah, (hereby) sends greet-
m ʾlyšb wlšlm bytk br-	ings to (you), Eliashib, and to your household. I bl-
kt[k] lyhwh wʿt kṣʾty	ess [you] by Yahweh. And now, when I left
mbytk wšlḥty ʾt	your house, I sent
sp[r] zkh lpny gʾlyhw b-	recei[p]t to Gealiah in (the)
y[d ʿ]zryhw wʾt hṣrwr	ha[nd of A]zariah – the purse,
šʾ ʾtk whšbt[m?] k[lw]	carry it with you! And return a[ll of] i[t].
ʾm ksp 5 [ḥʾr] wʾm y[š b]-	If (there is still) money, look for 5 sheqels. And if there is still, at
[m]sbk šmn, šlḥ	your [p]ost, any oil left—send it!
...hnḥ wʾl tšlḥ	(As for the other thing,) drop it, don't send it/one
[unintelligible traces]

And the backside:

ʾm hyyn tšlḥ < wkl ḥpṣ-	If there is any wine, send (1/2? 1/4?). If there is anything (else) you ne-
k tšlḥ wʾm yš h[ ... ] lh[m]	-ed, send (= write to me about it). And if there is still [...], gi[ve] th[em]...

When the ostracon was found, the text side on the backside were unintelligible but in 2017 a team of researchers were able to reconstruct the text using multispectral imaging techniques.

=== Ostracon 18 ===
Ostracon 18, also known as the House of Yahweh ostracon, has an inscription that reads:

ʾl ʾdny ʾly-	To my lord Elia-
šb yhwh yš-	shib: may Yahweh inq-
ʾl lšlmk wʿt	uire after your well-being. And now,
tn lšmryhw	give to Shemariah
⥊ wlqrsy	a measure (of flour), and to the Kerosite
ttn ^{߈} wld-	you will give a measure (of flour). And concerning the mat-
br ʾšr ṣ-	ter about which you co-
wtny šlm	mmanded me, it is well.
byt yhwh	In the House of Yahweh,
hʾ yšb	he is staying.

"The Kerosite" may refer to someone who was one of the Nethinim, a temple servant.

The ostracon is notable because of the ending, "house of YHWH", which, according to many scholars, may be a reference to the Jerusalem temple. Philip J. King and Lawrence E. Stager argue that since the temple at Arad was demolished 100 years prior to when the ostracon was written it therefore must refer to the Jerusalem temple. Other scholars doubt whether the inscription refers to the Jerusalem temple.

=== Ostracon 24 ===
Ostraca 24 reads as follows:

mʿrd ⌉ wmqyn[h...]	From Arad, 50, and from Kin[ah...]
wšlḥtm ʾtm rmt ng[b by]-	And you shall send them to Ramat-Nege[b by the ha]-
d mlkyhw bn qrbʾwr whb-	nd of Malchijah the son of Qerab'ur and he shall
qydm ʾl yd ʾlyšʿ bn yrmy-	hand them over to Elisha the son of Jeremi-
hw brmt ngb pn yqrh ʾt h-	ah in Ramat-Negeb, lest anything should happen to the
ʿyr dbr wdbr hmlk ʾtkm	city. And the word of the king is incumbent upon you
bnbškm hnh šlḥty lhʿyd	for your very life! Behold, I have sent to warn
bkm hym hʾnšm ʾt ʾlyš-	warn you [Eliashib] today: [Get] the men to Elish-
ʿ pn tbʾ ʾdm šmh	a: lest Edom should come there!

The letter has been interpreted as ordering the commander of the fort to dispatch reinforcements to withstand an Edomite attack.

== See also ==
- Canaanite and Aramaic inscriptions
- Lachish letters
- Samaria ostraca
- Three shekel ostracon
