= Robert Deutsch =

Israeli antiquities dealer

Robert Deutsch is an Israeli antiquities dealer, archaeologist, epigrapher, and numismatist. He is known for being accused of six forgery charges of several biblical archaeological artifacts in 2004.

== Education and background ==
Deutsch has a PhD from Tel Aviv University. He participated in the Tell Megiddo archaeological expedition from 1992 to 2004 and was also a lecturer in epigraphy at the University of Haifa from 1997 to 2004. In addition, Deutsch served as the president of the Israel Numismatic Society from 2015 to 2019.

== Trial, acquittal, and subsequent lawsuit ==
In 2004, Deutsch, Oded Golan and three others were indicted in a Jerusalem court on charges of forgery. The Israel Antiquities Authority (IAA) claimed that the four were part of a forgery ring that had been operating for more than 20 years, misleading collectors of biblical artifacts and museums worldwide into purchasing apparently biblically-significant artifacts that were really modern-day forgeries.

In 2008, Deutsch and the other remaining defendants (two had their charges dismissed from the case) filed for the case to be dismissed, alleging that the prosecution had failed to present a case. However, the judge disagreed, and the trial continued.

In 2012, Deutsch was acquitted of all charges as the prosecution failed to prove the charges beyond a reasonable doubt. However, the judge on the case said that the outcome did not represent a comment on the true authenticity of the objects, and the IAA continued to maintain that the artifacts part of the trial were "unequivocally established" as forgeries by experts.

Following his acquittal, Deutsch sued the IAA, its director Shuka Dorfman, the head of the IAA's anti-theft unit Amir Ganor, the Jerusalem District Attorney and Assistant District Attorney. Demanding $3 million in damages, the suit alleged gross negligence by the defendants in the prosecution of the forgery trial and irreversible damage to his business and academic reputation.
