= Oded Golan =

Israeli engineer

Oded Golan (Hebrew: עודד גולן; born 1951 in Tel Aviv) is an Israeli engineer, entrepreneur, and antiquities collector. He owns one of the largest collections of Biblical archaeology items in the world.

== Biography ==
Oded Golan is the son of an engineer and a professor of microbiology. He served as an officer in the Israel Defense Forces before studying industrial and management engineering at the Technion, graduating with honors. Since childhood, Golan has had a keen interest in archeology and antiquities. At the age of 10, during a visit to the ancient site of Tel Hatzor, he discovered the world’s oldest dictionary, which was later published by Professor Yigael Yadin. At the age of 12, Golan participated in excavations at Masada.

== Antiquity collection ==
Golan's collection, amassed over a period of more than 50 years, contains thousands of archaeological artifacts, the vast majority of which were purchased from antiquities dealers, mostly in East Jerusalem.

Golan’s collection includes a wide range of artifacts which together represent the culture of Israel and TransJordan from the fifth millennium BCE to the fifth century AD. Among the items that attracted international attention is the James Ossuary, the bone box possibly used to intern the bones of James, brother of Jesus.

== Controversy ==
In June 2003, Golan was accused by the Israel Antiquities Authority (IAA) of involvement in the forgery of one half of the James Ossuary inscription, the Jehoash Inscription and other items. Golan denied any involvement in forgery and argued that he purchased the two items from licensed antiquities dealers in 1976 and 1999 respectively. Four other defendants were indicted along with Golan, including two of the largest antiquities dealers in Israel.

In 2012, the court acquitted Golan of forgery and fraud, but convicted him of illegal trading in antiquities. In late 2013, the Supreme Court ordered the State to return to Golan the James Ossuary, the Jehoash Inscription and hundreds of other items that had been confiscated by the IAA "for the purpose of investigation." (Note: Books written on the subject included: ‘The Brother of Jesus’ by Hershel Shanks and Ben Witherington, ‘Resurrecting the Brother of Jesus’, edited by Byrne & Mcnary-zak, ‘The Jesus Family Tomb’ by Jacobovici and Pellegrino, and ‘The Jehoash Tablet: King Jehoash and the Mystery of the Temple of Solomon Inscription’ by By Prof. Victor Sasson. Films created for Discovery on the subject included ‘James, Brother of Jesus’ (2003), ‘The Jesus Discovery/The Resurrection Tomb Mystery’ (2012), and ‘The Lost Tomb of Jesus’ (2007).)

The IAA claimed that Golan and numerous antiquity dealers were involved in forgery assisted by experts in ancient Semitic languages. Media coverage and documentary films which reported the case created what Golan called a “media circus". The BBC reported that when the police took Golan into custody and searched his apartment they discovered a workshop with a range of tools, materials, and half finished 'antiquities'. According to the allegations, collectors around the world paid hundreds of thousands of dollars for artifacts that came through Golan's associates. Dozens of items were examined. Police suspected that artefacts made by these forgers had found their way into leading museums.

The documentary film The History Merchants alleged Golan (working with a team of people, including an expert in ancient semitic languages and an artisan) had produced forged artifacts for sale on the religious antiquities market. In 2004, Horizon aired King Solomon's Tablet of Stone on the BBC. This program included allegations of forgery and fraudulent activity by Golan.

On December 29, 2004, Golan was indicted in an Israeli court along with three antiquities dealers; Robert Deutsch, one of Israel’s leading antiquities dealers and an inscriptions expert who has lectured at the University of Haifa; dealer and conservator Refael Braun; and dealer Shlomo Cohen; Faiz al-Amla, a Palestinian dealer from the village of Beit Ula in the Hebron Hills was charged with trading in antiquities without a license. Early in the trial, charges were dropped against Braun and Cohen, leaving Golan and Deutsch as the only defendants.

Golan denied any involvement in forgery and argued that the inscriptions were purchased from licensed antiquities dealers. He presented evidence that he had purchased the James Ossuary in 1976 and the Jehoash Table in 1999. Golan stated that to the best of his understanding and judgment, these are authentic ancient inscriptions.

== Court ruling and acquittal ==
In a trial that lasted almost eight years (2004–2012), the District Court of Jerusalem heard testimony relating to the authenticity of the inscriptions on the James Ossuary and the Jehoash Tablet from over 50 experts from a wide range of fields, who examined the inscriptions and submitted dozens of scientific reports, and 70 other witnesses including antiquities dealers and well-known collectors. Trial transcripts covered over 12,000 pages, and the court ruling was 438 pages long.

The IAA announced that they accepted the court's ruling. The State accepted the main decision of the District Court and did not appeal against the judgment. After the judgment, the State moved to confiscate the James Ossuary and the Jehoash Tablet for the State Treasury, arguing that these items may well be of enormous historic, religious and archeological significance and therefore should not remain in private hands. The District Court and the Supreme Court denied this motion and ordered the State to return to Golan all the antiquities that had been taken from him. The James Ossuary and the Jehoash Tablet, as well as hundreds of other antiquities, were returned to Golan in late 2013.

== See also ==
- Three shekel ostracon
