= Three shekel ostracon =

Archaeological forgery

The three shekel ostracon is a pottery fragment bearing a forged text supposedly dating from between the 7th and 9th centuries BCE. It is 8.6 centimeters high and 10.9 centimeters wide and contains five lines of ancient Hebrew writing. The inscription mentions a king named Ashyahu (אשיהו ’Ašyahu) donating three shekels (about 20–50 grams of silver) to the House of Yahweh. No king named Ashyahu is mentioned in the Bible, but some scholars believe it may refer to Jehoash (יהואש Yəhō’āš), who ruled Judea 802–787 BCE.

The ostracon was purchased by Shlomo Moussaieff from the Jerusalem antiquities dealer Oded Golan. Doubts about the authenticity of this and other artefacts sold by Golan began to be expressed in the late 1990s, and in 2003 Professor Christopher Rollston, a leading authority on Northwest Semitic inscriptions, said he is "confident beyond a reasonable doubt" that the "three shekel ostracon" is a forgery. The same negative conclusion was reached on the basis of a scientific examination of the patina.

== Text ==
𐤊𐤀𐤔𐤓𐤎𐤅𐤟𐤊𐤀𐤔 𐤄𐤅𐤟𐤄𐤌𐤋𐤊𐤟𐤋𐤕𐤕𐤟𐤁𐤃 𐤊𐤓𐤉𐤄𐤅𐤟𐤊𐤎𐤅𐤕𐤓 𐤟𐤔𐤔𐤟𐤋𐤁𐤉𐤕𐤉𐤄𐤅𐤄 𐤔𐤛	kʾšr.swk.ʾšy hw.hmlk.ltt.byd [z]kryhw.ksw.tr šš.lbyt.yhwh š3	According to your order, Ashya- hu the king, to give by the hand of [Z]ekaryahu silver of Tar- shish for the house of Yahweh three shekels.

== See also ==
- House of Yahweh ostracon
