= Elephantine =

Island in the Nile

Native name: جزيرة فيلة (Ⲉ)ⲓⲏⲃ 𓍋𓃀𓅱𓃰
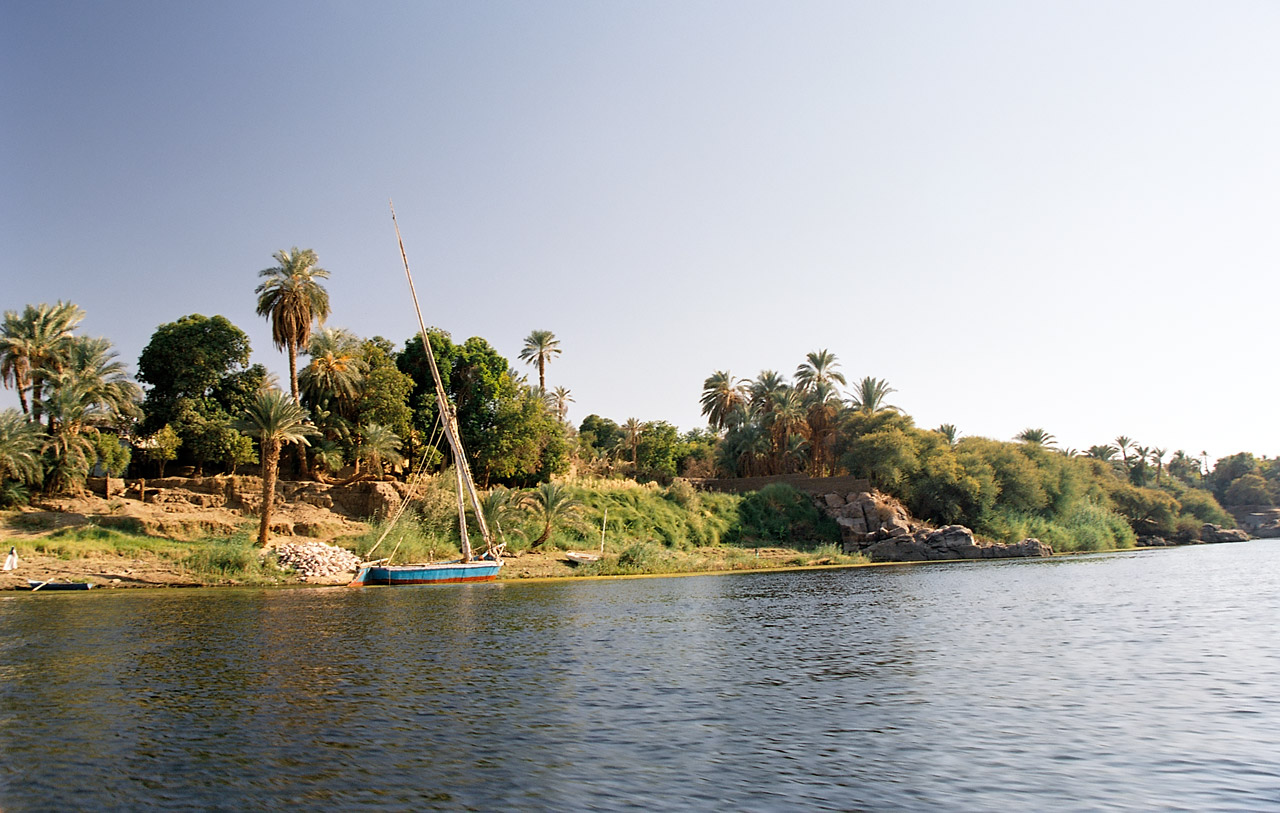
- West bank of Elephantine Island on the Nile

- Location in the Nile at Aswan, Upper Egypt

Geography
- Coordinates: 24.09°N 32.89°E
- Adjacent to: Nile
- Length: 1,200 m (3900 ft)
- Width: 400 m (1300 ft)

Administration
- Egypt

Elephantine (/ˌɛlɪfænˈtaɪniː, -ˈtiː-/ EL-if-an-TY-nee, -TEE-; Ancient Egyptian: 𓍋𓃀𓅱𓃰, romanized: ꜣbw; Egyptian Arabic: جزيرة الفنتين; Greek: Ἐλεφαντίνη Elephantíne; Coptic: (Ⲉ)ⲓⲏⲃ transl. cop – transl. (e)iēb, Coptic pronunciation: [jæb]) is an island on the Nile, forming part of the city of Aswan in Upper Egypt. The archaeological digs on the island became a World Heritage Site in 1979, along with other examples of Upper Egyptian architecture, as part of the "Nubian Monuments from Abu Simbel to Philae" (despite Elephantine being neither Nubian, nor between Abu Simbel and Philae).

The island has been studied through excavation sites. Aramaic papyri and ostraca have been collected to study what life was like on Elephantine during the time of Ancient Egypt. There have been studies about the Elephantine Triad and the Jewish presence that formulated on the island.

The standard reference collection of the Aramaic documents of the Elephantine Papyri and Ostraca is the Textbook of Aramaic Documents from Ancient Egypt. They document (among other things) a mercenary community with its own Yahweh temple that coexisted and conflicted with local Egyptian religion, culminating in the temple's destruction in 410 BC.

== Etymology ==
The island was known to the ancient Egyptians as 𓍋𓃀𓅱𓃰 (ꜣbw), meaning an elephant. Through Middle Egyptian /ˈʀuːbaw/ to Medio-Late Egyptian /ˈjuːbəʔ/ to Coptic (Ⲉ)ⲓⲏⲃ /ˈjeβ/.

== Geography ==
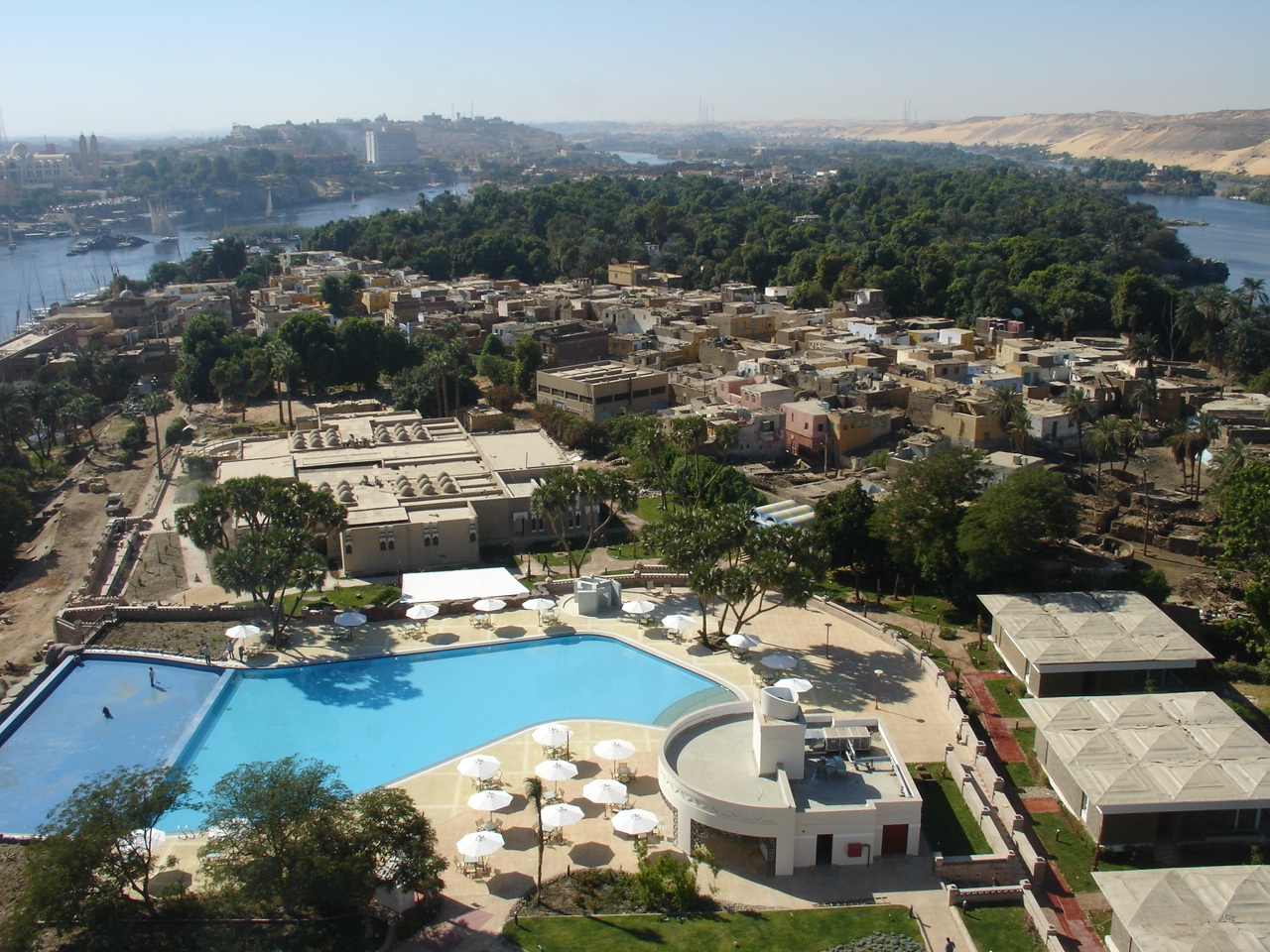
View south (upstream) of Elephantine Island and Nile, from a hotel tower.

Elephantine, or what Ancient Egyptians called Yebu or Abu, is located at the uppermost part of the Nile river that is a part of Aswan. With the length of 1.6 km (0.99 mi) and width of 450 m (1,480 ft) at its widest point, Elephantine was located in the first nome. The layout of this and other nearby islands in Aswan can be seen from west bank hillsides along the Nile. The island is located just downstream of the First Cataract, at the southern border of Upper Egypt with Lower Nubia. This region above is called Upper Egypt because it is further up the Nile.

The island may have received its name after its shape, which in aerial views is similar to that of an elephant tusk, or from the rounded rocks along the banks resembling elephants.

== Ancient Egypt ==
The island stood at the border between Egypt and Nubia, so its location made it a natural cargo transfer point for river trade. Trade routes would stop on Elephantine to deliver ivory, a precious good in Ancient Egypt. It was an excellent defensive site: A fort had been erected c. 3000 BC on the island during the First Dynasty, though the island had been occupied earlier. This border is near the Tropic of Cancer.

Historical texts from the Middle Kingdom of Egypt mention the mother of Amenemhat I, founder of the Twelfth Dynasty, being from the Elephantine Egyptian nome Ta-Seti. Many scholars have argued that Amenemhat I's mother was of Nubian origin.

=== Archaeological sites ===
Between 1893 and 1910, Aramaic papyri, consisting of Jewish archives, were found and collected on Elephantine. There has been a large presence of German excavation with a vast amount of discoveries of papyri and ostraca. The documents have led to discoveries about Jewish presence and significance in Elephantine. French teams also set out to Elephantine where they discovered several hundred ostraca but very few have been published thus far. The major findings from the end of the 19th century to the beginning of the 20th century are found in museums in Berlin, Brooklyn, Cairo, London, Munich, and Paris, with the largest collection being in Berlin.

Ongoing excavations by the German Archaeological Institute at the town have uncovered many findings, on display in the Aswan Museum located on the island, including a mummified ram of Khnum. Artifacts dating back to prehistoric Egypt have been found on Elephantine. A rare calendar, known as the Elephantine Calendar of Things, which dates to the reign of Thutmose III during the Eighteenth Dynasty, was found in fragments on the island.

Important technological evidence from the German excavations was recently published, datable to the Middle Kingdom. An intentional production of arsenical bronze, evidence of the cementation alloying process of copper with speiss inside ceramic crucibles, and a piece of speiss, were published from the Elephantine archaeological contexts.

In ancient times the island was also a vital stone quarry, providing granite for monuments and buildings all over Egypt.

==== Temples ====
Prior to 1822, there were temples to Thutmose III and Amenhotep III on the island. In 1822, they were destroyed during the campaign of Muhammad Ali, who had taken power in Egypt, to conquer Sudan. Both temples were relatively intact prior to the deliberate demolition.

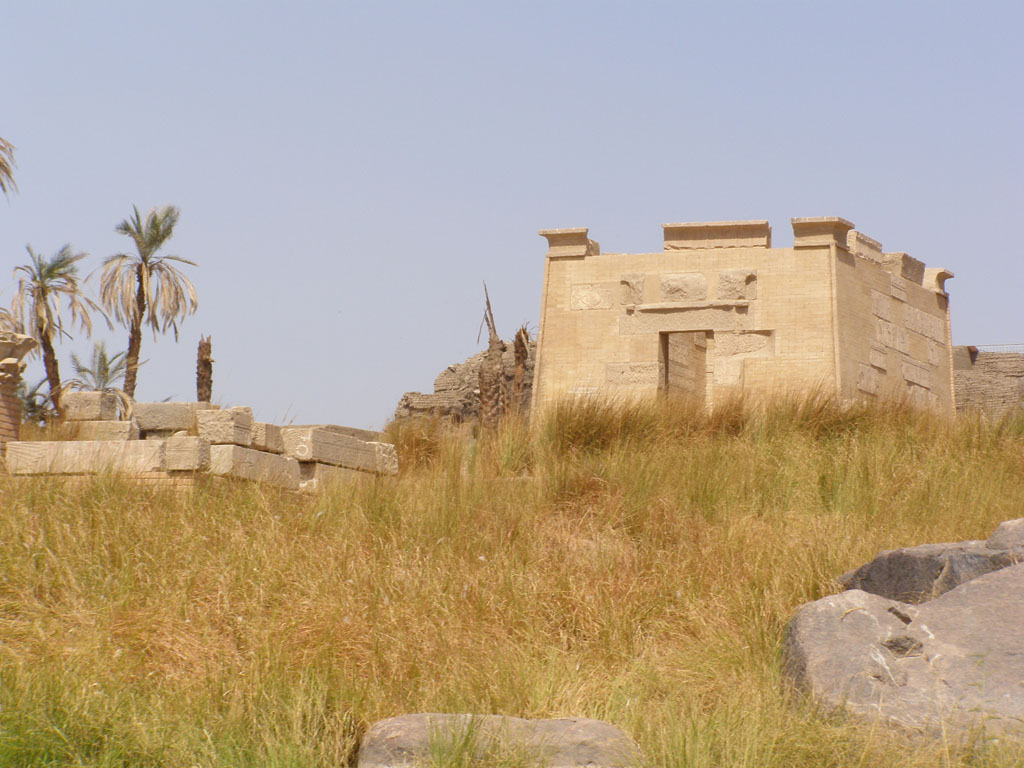
Small Kalabsha Temple Reconstruction, south of the island.

The main two temples of the island were for the goddess Satet (or Satis) and the god Khnum. The first temple was the Temple of Satet, founded around 3000 BC and enlarged and renovated over the next 3,000 years. There are records of an Egyptian temple to Khnum on the island as early as the Third Dynasty. This temple was completely rebuilt in the Late Period, during the Thirtieth Dynasty of Egypt, just before the foreign rule that followed in the Graeco-Roman Period. The Greeks formed the Ptolemaic dynasty during their three-hundred-year rule over Egypt (305–30 BC) and maintained the ancient religious customs and traditions, while often associating the Egyptian deities with their own.

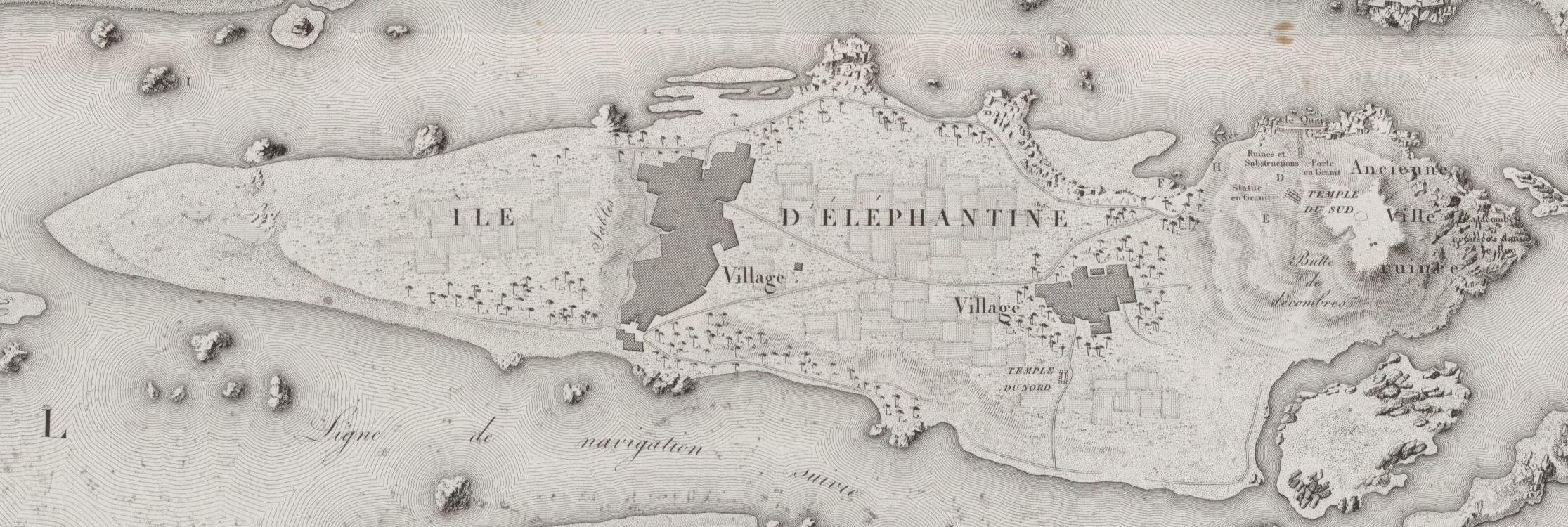
Elephantine, as published in the 1809 Description de l'Égypte.

Most of the present day southern tip of the island is taken up by the ruins of the Temple of Khnum. These, the oldest ruins still standing on the island, are composed of a granite step pyramid from the Third Dynasty and a small temple built for the local Sixth Dynasty nomarch, Heqaib. In the Middle Kingdom, many officials, such as the local governors Sarenput I or Heqaib III, dedicated statues and shrines into the temple.

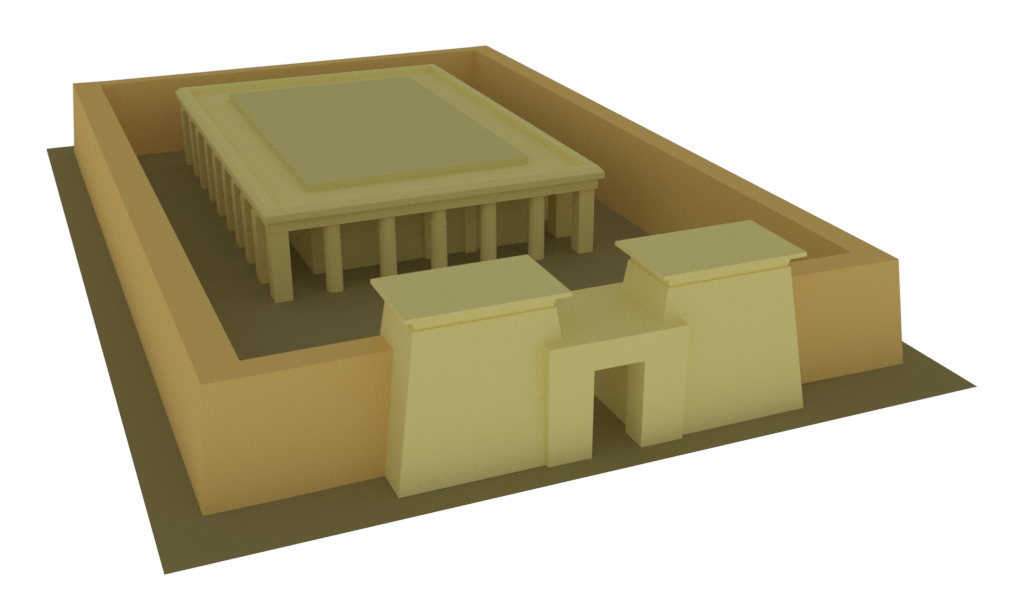
Khnum temple at Elephantine island, New kingdom, Reconstruction

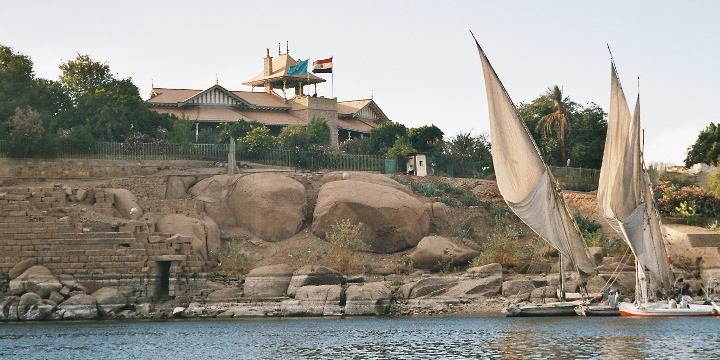
The Aswan Museum, and a nilometer (lower left)

==== Nilometers ====
A nilometer was a structure for measuring the Nile River's clarity and the water level during the annual flood season. There are two nilometers at Elephantine Island. The more famous is a corridor nilometer associated with the Temple of Satis, with a stone staircase that descends the corridor. It is one of the oldest nilometers in Egypt, last reconstructed in Roman times and still in use as late as the nineteenth century AD. Ninety steps that lead down to the river are marked with Arabic, Roman, and hieroglyphic numerals. Visible at the water's edge are inscriptions carved deeply into the rock during the Seventeenth Dynasty.

The other nilometer is a rectangular basin located at the island's southern tip, near the Temple of Khnum and opposite the Old Cataract Hotel. It is probably the older of the two. One of the nilometers, though it is not certain which, is mentioned by the Greek historian Strabo.

Many sources claim that the fabled "Well of Eratosthenes", famous in connection with Eratosthenes' presumed calculation of the Earth's circumference, was located on the island. Strabo mentions a well that was used to observe that Aswan lies on the Tropic of Cancer, but the reference is to a well at Aswan, not at Elephantine. Neither nilometer at Elephantine is suitable for the purpose, while the well at Aswan is apparently lost.

=== Elephantine triad ===
The Elephantine Triad is between Khnum, Satis, and Anuket. It is debated whether Anuket is the daughter of Khnum and Satis, or the sister of Satis. Elephantine was the dwelling place of Khnum, the ram-headed god of the cataracts, who guarded and controlled the waters of the Nile from caves beneath the island.

Satis was worshipped from very early times as a war goddess and protector of this strategic region of Egypt. When seen as a fertility goddess, she personified the bountiful annual flooding of the Nile. The cult of Satis originated in the ancient city of Aswan. Later, when the triad was formed, Khnum became identified as her consort and, thereby, was thought of as the father of Anuket. His role in myths later changed; another deity was ascribed duties with the river. At that time his role as a potter enabled him to be assigned a duty in the creation of human bodies.

Anuket was the Goddess of the first cataract and is referred to as the personification of the Nile. A cult is formed on the Island for Anuket.

== Jewish presence ==
The Elephantine papyri and ostraca are caches of legal documents and letters written in Imperial Aramaic dating to sometime in the fifth century BC. These papyri document the presence of a community of Judean mercenaries and their families on Elephantine, starting in the seventh century BC. The mercenaries guarded the frontier between Egypt and Nubia to the south. Following the 587 BC destruction of Jerusalem, some Judean refugees traveled south and, in what may be called an "exodus in reverse", settled on Elephantine. They maintained their own temple (the House of Yahweh), in which sacrifices were offered, evincing polytheistic beliefs, which functioned alongside that of Khnum. It is not clear when or why the Jewish community settled in Elephantine.

The temple may have been built in reaction to Manasseh's reinstitution of pagan worship or simply to serve the needs of the Jewish community.

=== Conflict Between Jews and Egyptians ===
There is bias that surrounds the Jewish and Egyptian interactions that occurred on Elephantine, but the findings show that there was often culture interchange. Conflict began due to a stone that was originally the Egyptians', but turned up in the hands of the Jews.

The earliest recount of the Jewish temple is from 525 BC. In 410 BC, the Jewish temple, the House of Yahweh, was burned down by a Persian military commander due to bribery from Khnum priests. While no explicit reasoning has been given for this lash out, it has been suspected that the priests did this because of the Jewish rituals of sacrificing of sheep, especially during Passover. Papyri records that have been collected from this time show Jewish letters asking Bagoas for help rebuilding the temple.

The standard reference collection of the Aramaic documents of the Elephantine Papyri and Ostraca is the Textbook of Aramaic Documents from Ancient Egypt.

== Other features ==
The Aswan Museum is located at the southern end of the island. Ongoing excavations by the German Archaeological Institute at the island's ancient town site have uncovered many findings that are now on display in the museum, including a mummified ram of Khnum. A sizable population of Nubians live in three villages in the island's middle section. A large luxury hotel is at the island's northern end.

The Aswan Botanical Garden is adjacent to the west on el Nabatat Island.

== Primary Scholarly Documents ==
- Arthur Ungnad, Aramäische Papyrus aus Elephantine
- Eduard Sachau, 1908, Drei aramäische papyrusurkunden aus Elephantine
- Eduard Sachau, 1911, Aramäische Papyrus und Ostraka aus einer jüdischen Militär-Kolonie zu Elephantine
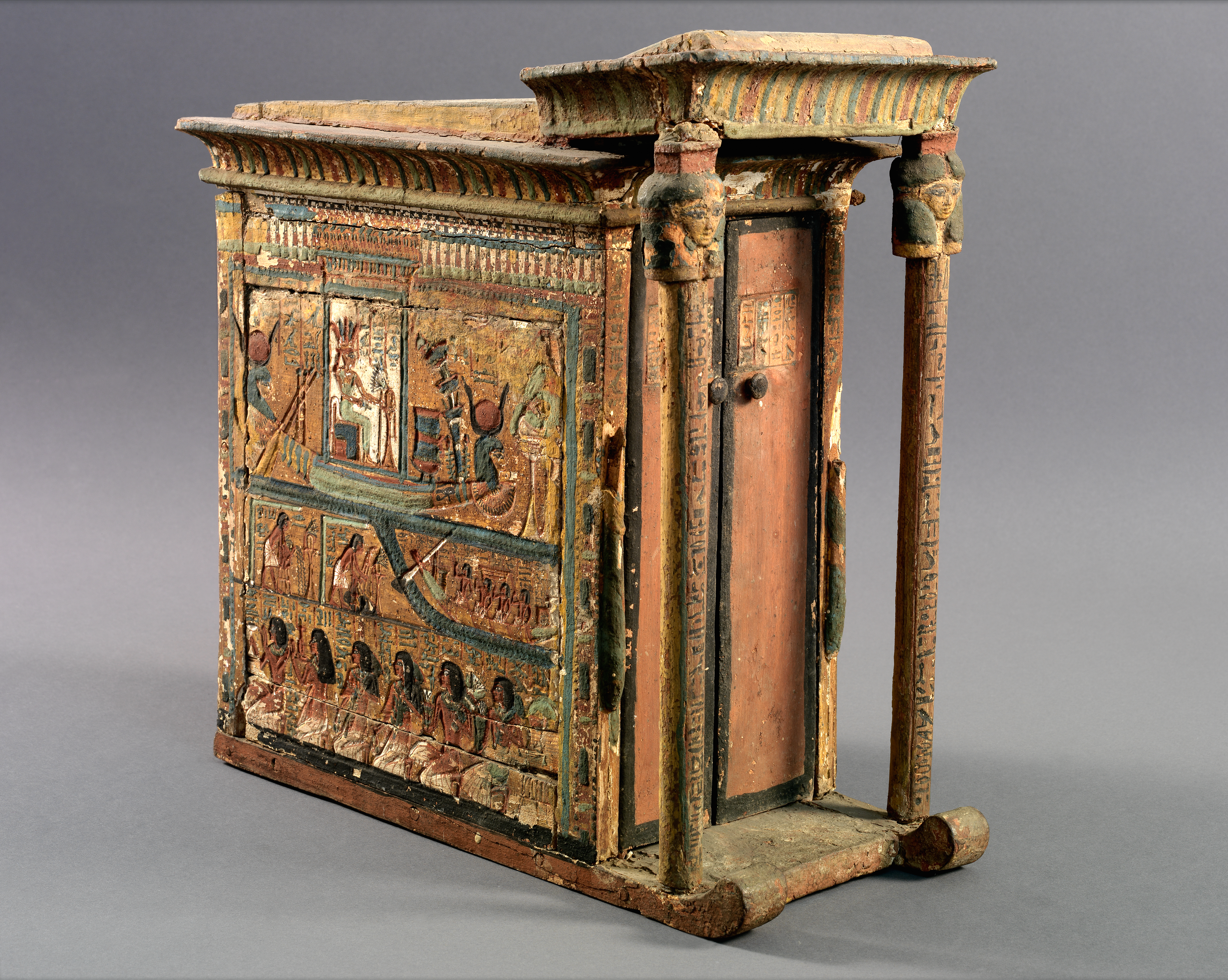
Votive naos with sledge and pronaos supported by hathoric columns, dedicated by the artisan Kasa to the Elephantine Triad. Museo Egizio, Turin.

== Gallery ==
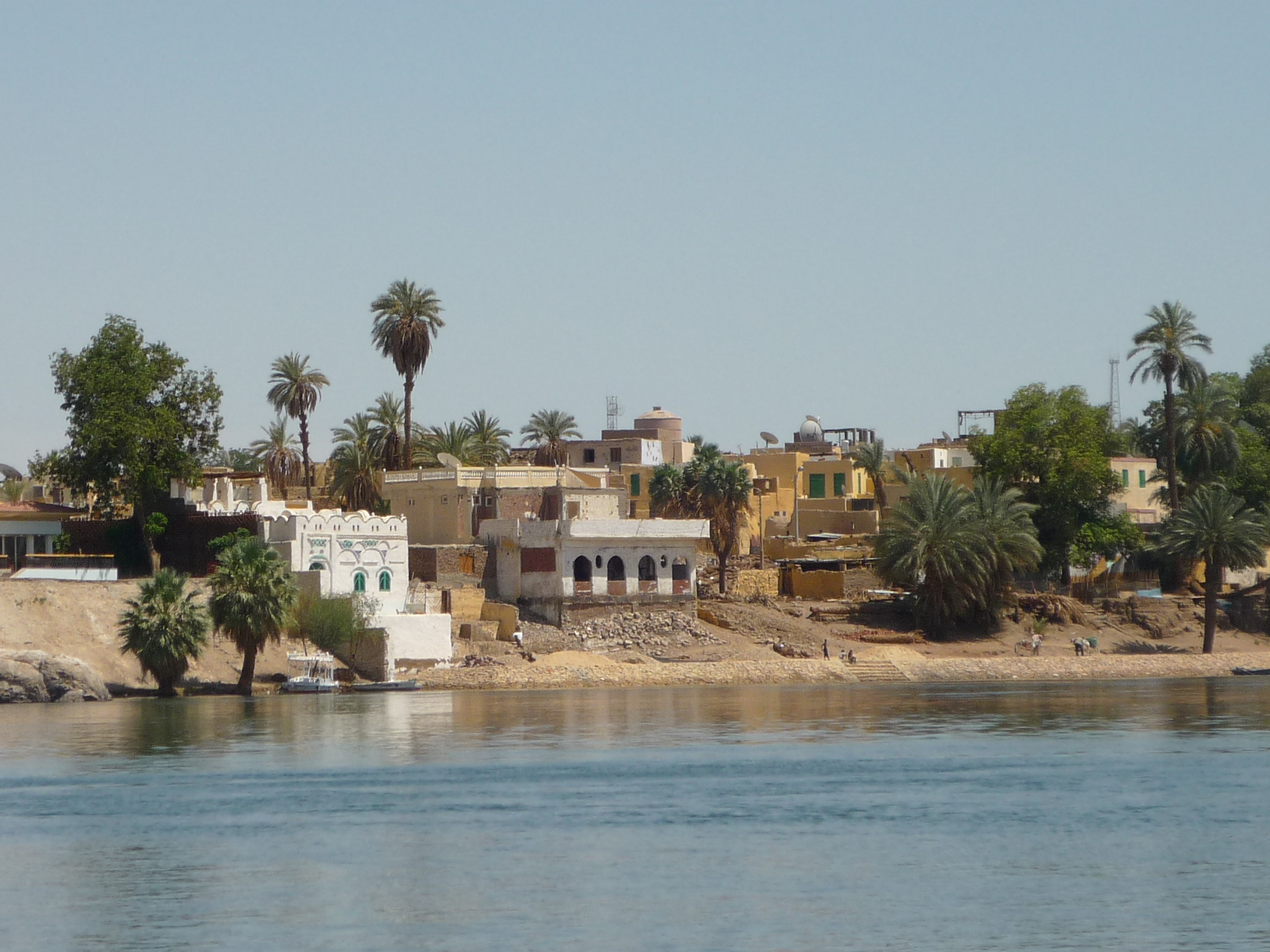
Nubian houses on central Elephantine Island

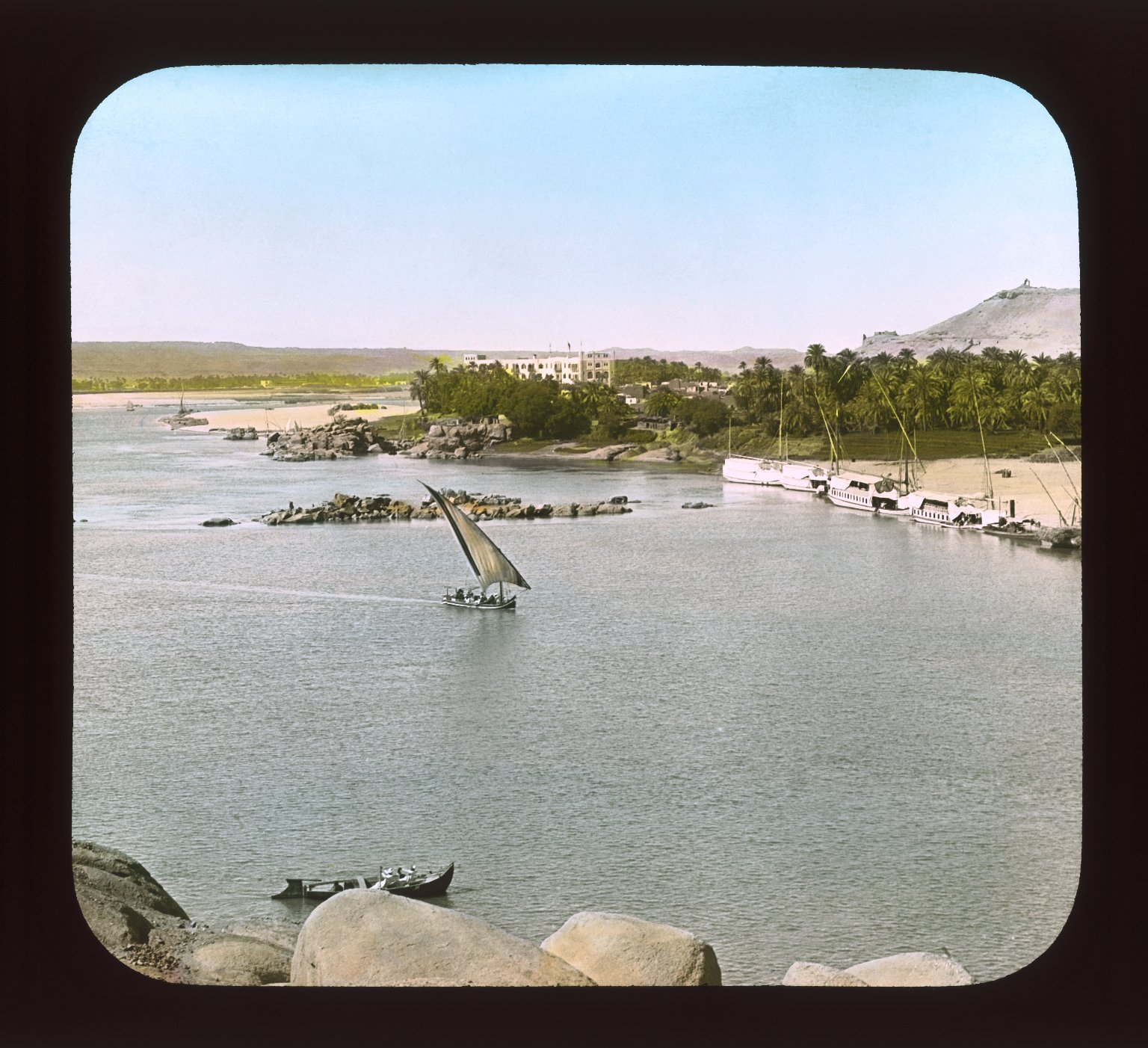
Verdant Elephantine Island, opposite Assuan, Egypt", 1908. Lantern slide. Brooklyn Museum

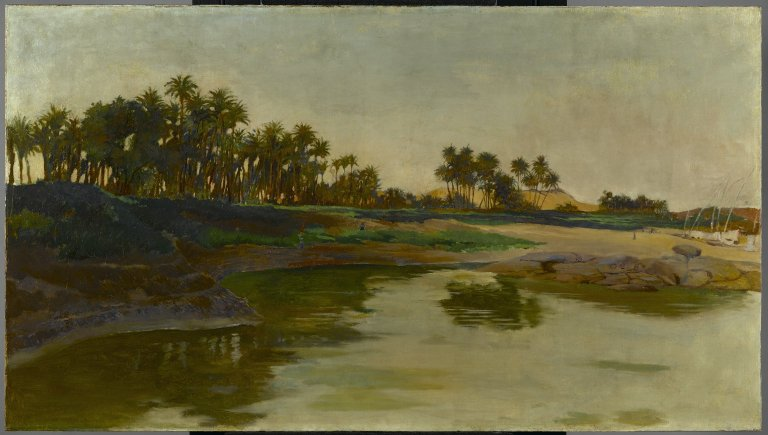
Island of Elephantine, by Edwin Howland Blashfield. Brooklyn Museum

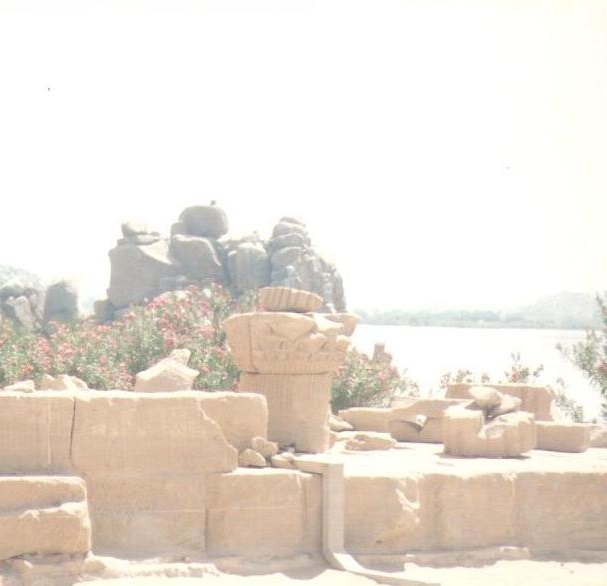
Ruins on Elephantine Island in 2000

== See also ==
- Sehel Island
- Temple of Satet
