= Gustave Rolland =

French engineer, soldier and politician

Deputy for Moselle
- In office 26 November 1848 – 26 May 1849
- Preceded by: Prince Louis Napoleon Bonaparte

Personal details
- Born: 16 July 1809 Vatimont, Moselle, France
- Died: 23 April 1871 (aged 61) Versailles, Yvelines, France
- Occupation: Engineer and politician

Gustave Rolland (16 July 1809 – 23 April 1871) was a French engineer, soldier and politician.

== Early years (1809–48) ==
Gustave Rolland was born on 16 July 1809 in Vatimont, Moselle. His parents were Félix Rolland (1783–1848) and Joséphine Barbe Cécile Rolland (born 1784). His brother was the inventor Eugène Rolland (1812–85). Rolland was described as having blond hair, clean shaven, straight nose, chestnut eyes, small mouth, round chin, full face and height of 175 centimetres (69 in).

Rolland entered the École Polytechnique in 1827 and graduated as an army engineer. His first posting was to Mézières, where he undertook a project to make a canal beside the citadel. Fifteen years later he was assigned to Thionville, where he was able to establish a mobile defensive barrier. He prepared elements of it in experiments in Metz. Rolland reached the rank of captain.

== Deputy (1848–49) ==
During the French Second Republic Gustave Rolland was elected a deputy for the Moselle department in the National Constituent Assembly on 26 November 1848. He stood in place of Prince Louis Napoleon Bonaparte, who had chosen another department, and won by a decisive margin. He sat with the Right group. He voted for the Rateau proposal, for the banning of clubs, for the expedition to Rome and against the indictment of the President and the Ministers. In 1849 he failed to be reelected to the Legislative Assembly. He left office on 26 May 1849.

== Later career (1849–71) ==
Rolland lived in retirement during the Second French Empire. He married Bernardine Marie Léonie Dauss around 1850, daughter of Benjamin Dausse (1801–90), an engineer of the Corps des Ponts et Chaussées. Their son was Georges Rolland, born in Paris on 23 January 1852. During the Franco-Prussian War he served as a battalion commander in the Siege of Paris (1870–71). He was promoted to Officer of the Legion of Honour on 7 January 1871.

Gustave Rolland died on 23 April 1871 in Versailles, Yvelines. His son, Georges Rolland, became an engineer in the Corps des mines in 1877, and later became president of the Société des Aciéries de Longwy and a member of the board of the Comité des Forges de France.

== Sources ==
- Garric, Alain, "Gustave ROLLAND", Geneanet (in French)
- "Gustave Rolland", Assemblée nationale (in French)
- Mahl, Robert, "Georges François Joseph ROLLAND (1852–1910)", Les Annales des Mines (in French)
- Médelsheim, Alphonse Cerfberr de (1879), "ROLLAND (Gustave)", Biographie alsacienne-lorraine, A. Lemerre
- Robert, Adolphe; Cougny, Gaston (1889), "Gustave Rolland", Dictionnaire des parlementaires français de 1789 à 1889 (in French), Edgar Bourloton
- "Rolland, Georges", Patrons de France (in French), Système d'information sur le patronat français
- Rolland, Gustave (in French), Légion d'Honneur
