= Georges Rolland =

French geologist and industrialist

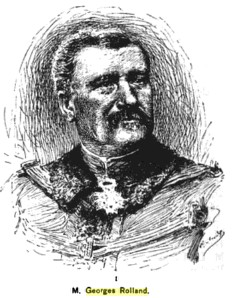
- Georges Rolland from Scribners Magazine, 1891
- Born: Georges François Joseph Rolland; 23 January 1852; Paris, France
- Died: 25 July 1910 (aged 58); Gorcy, Meurthe-et-Moselle, France
- Occupations: Geologist, explorer and industrialist

Georges François Joseph Rolland (23 January 1852 – 25 July 1910) was a French geologist and industrialist, a member of the Corps des mines, who worked in Algeria in the 1880s. He made important discoveries about the underground hydrology of the Sahara. He was a leading advocate of a trans-Sahara railway to link French colonial possessions in West Africa. After returning to France he explored the geology of the Briey iron ore basin in Lorraine. He married the heiress of a Lorraine steelworks, and became president of the Société métallurgique de Gorcy and the Aciéries de Longwy, and director of various other enterprises.

== Early years ==
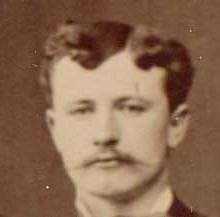
Georges Rolland as a student at the École des Mines de Paris (1874–77)

Georges Rolland was born in Paris on 23 January 1852. His parents were Gustave Rolland (1809–71) and Bernardine Marie Léonie Dauss. His father was a former officer of the Engineers who became a Deputy. His uncle was the inventor Eugène Rolland (1812–85). At a very young age he was accepted by the École Navale and the École Polytechnique, and chose the École Polytechnique. Rolland studied at the École Polytechnique from 1871 to 1874, graduating fourth out of 93. He went on to the École des Mines de Paris, where he studied from 1874 to 1877 and graduated in second place.

Rolland became an engineer in the Corps des mines in 1877, attached to the office of Charles de Freycinet, Minister of Public Works. In 1877 he took part in the steam engines section of the Exposition Universelle.

== Saharan explorations ==
The Trans-Saharan expedition was appointed in 1879 by Freycinet to investigate construction of a railway across the Sahara. Three possible routes starting from Oran in the west, Algiers in the center and Constantine in the east were to be examined by three expeditions. The western expedition was led by the engineer Justin Pouyanne; the central one was led by the engineer Auguste Choisy and included Georges Rolland, and the eastern one was led by Colonel Paul Flatters. The first two undertook their work without difficulty. The Flatters expedition was turned back by hostile Tuaregs before reaching Rhat. Flatters began a second expedition in November 1880. This ended in disaster, with Flatters and most of the others killed by the Tuaregs, and caused plans for a railway to be abandoned.

Rolland remained in the region, where he paid particular attention to the hydrography, including the underground waters, which could be used to irrigate arid land. With the help of a number of leading men, in 1881 he founded the Société agricole du Sud-Algérien (later the Société agricole et industrielle de Batna et du Sud-Algérien), with the aim of developing agriculture in the south of Algeria. At that time the railway extended only to Batna. Horse-drawn carriages went as far as Biskra, and from there travellers had to go on horseback. He established a colony in the Sahara of Constantine and introduced an irrigation system in the desert regions of Oued Righ between Biskra and Touggourt. The oasis of the Oued Righ became the site of a large date palm plantation.

In 1884 a geological section under Rolland was added to the Tunisian Scientific Exploration Mission. The Mission Scientifique de Tunisie (1885–87) was led by the botanist Ernest Cosson (1819–89). Rolland was assisted by Philippe Thomas from 1885 and Georges Le Mesle in 1887. Rolland covered the centre of the country, while Thomas worked further south and Le Mesle worked mainly in the north, apart from an expedition to the extreme south. The team gave good descriptions of the Jurassic of the Zaghouan region and the Eocene of the Maktar and Kairouan regions. As early as 1885, Rolland emphasized the regional importance of the great fault of Zaghouan. In 1902 he was asked by the Ministry of Education to write all the results of the Tunisian Scientific Exploration Mission, but he had to refuse for health reasons.

== Trans-Sahara railway ==
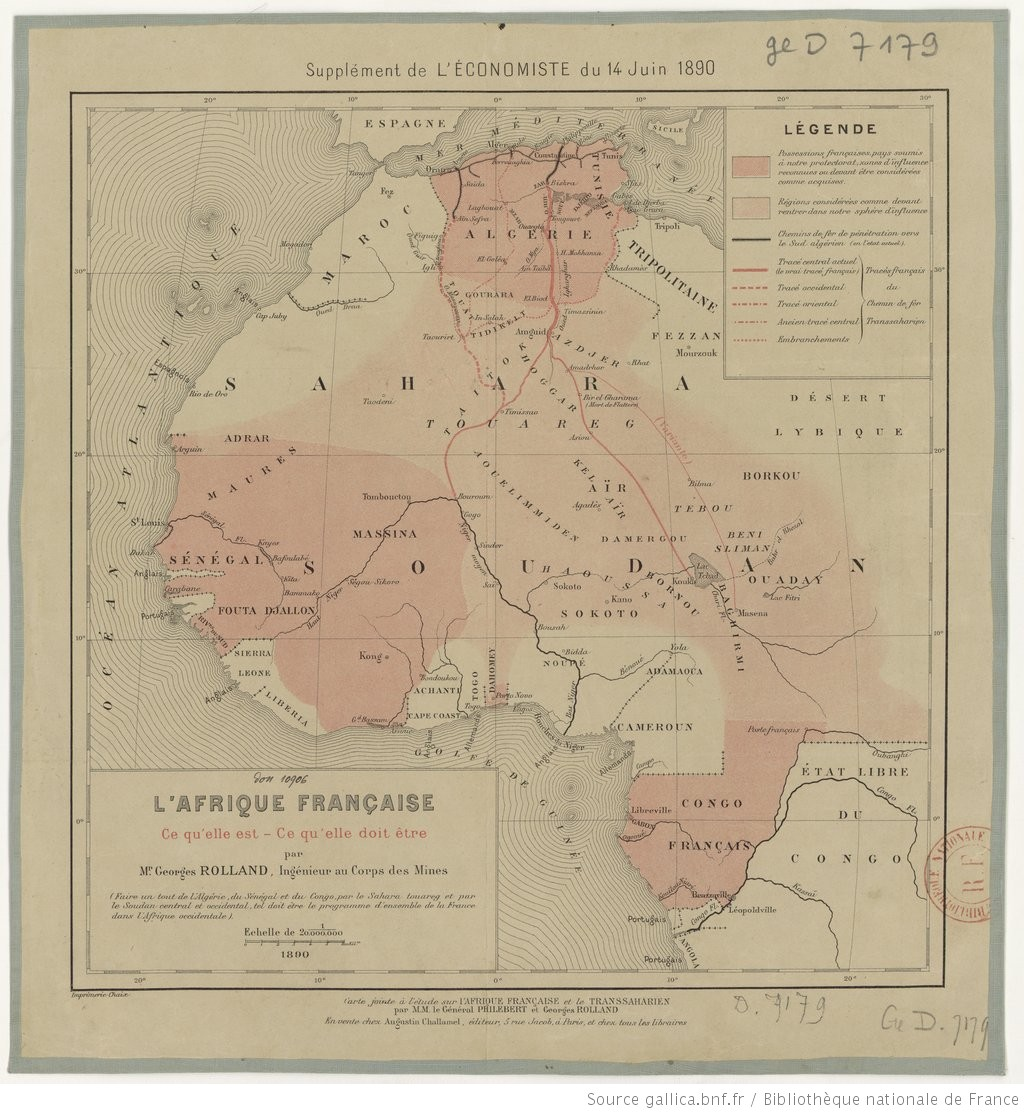
Rolland's French Africa, what it is, what it must be

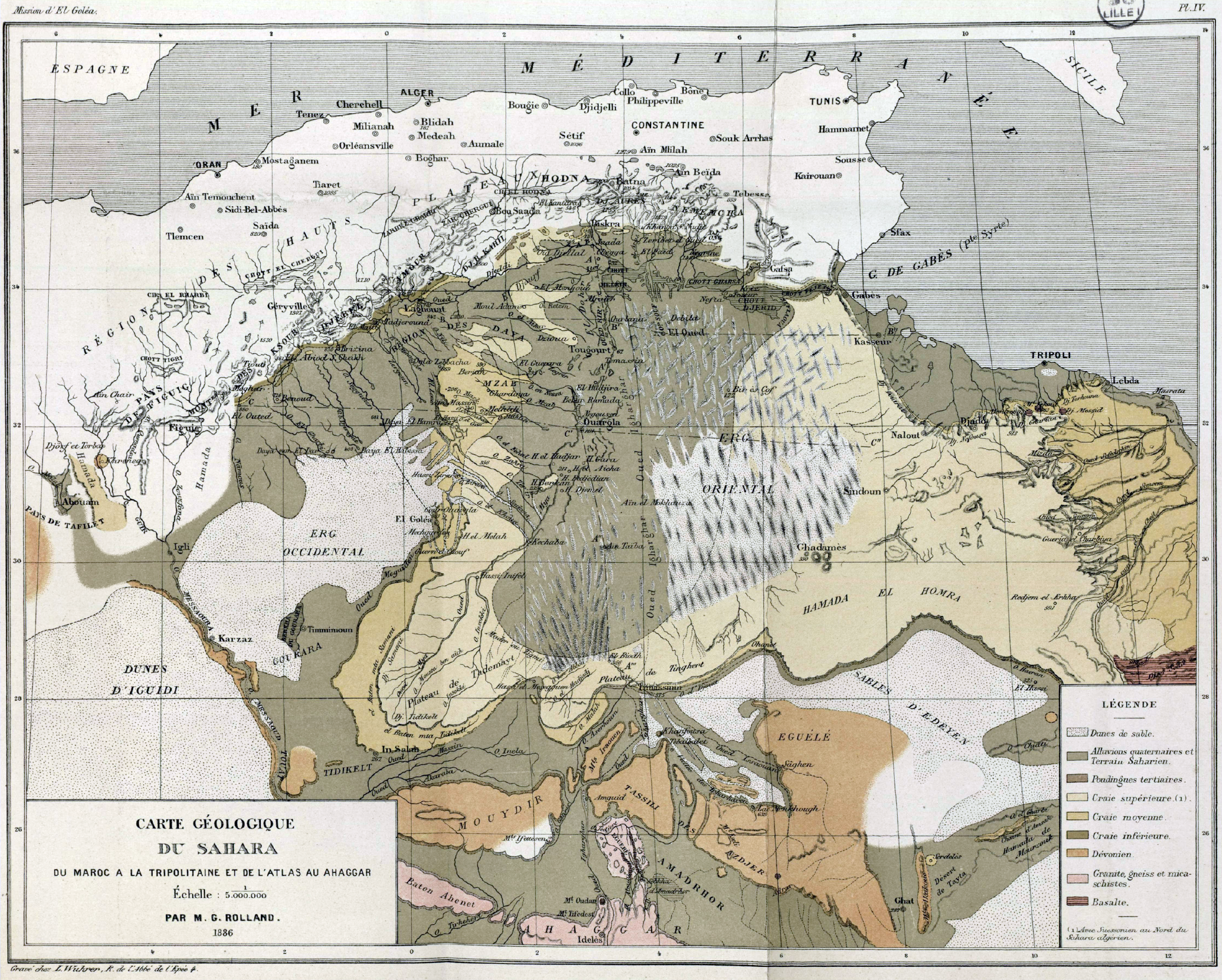
Rolland's 1890 map of the Geology and hydrology of the Algerian Sahara

Rolland remained interested in the idea of a railway, and in 1889 gave a lecture at the Geographical Society of Paris in which he described the scheme. The idea was also advocated by the retired General Charles Philebert, who had been involved in the conquest of Algeria as a young man. In 1890 Philebert and Rolland co-authored an influential pamphlet urging an immediate start to the railway project. The Minister of War appointed a committee on the question in April 1890, which stated that the railway would be feasible and profitable, as well as necessary from a military standpoint.

In 1890 Rolland published a coloured map entitled "French Africa, what it is, what it must be." The purpose was to show that a railroad across the Sahara from Algeria to the Sudan had great strategic value. The map showed darker-shaded areas of French possessions, protectorates and zones of influence, and lighter shaded "regions that must be considered as entering into our sphere of influence". The railway would consolidate France's territorial claims by linking the areas. Rolland and other promoters tried to form a chartered company to build the railway, but could not get the Algerian departments to agree which would have the terminus. The planned company did not materialize, although a law was passed that authorized a railway from Biskra, to the south of Constantine, to Ouargla. The Trans-Sahara railway was never built.

== Briey basin ==
In July 1893 Rolland was appointed a chief engineer of the Corps des mines. He was attached to the geological mapping service. He made a thorough study of Lorraine geology, particularly the Briey iron basin, where he played an important role in discovering its mineral wealth.

== Corporate positions ==
Rolland married the daughter of Alfred Labbé (died 1891), son of Jean-Joseph Labbé (1801–94), founder of the Forges de Gorcy. Jean-Joseph Labbé was also co-founder of the Aciéries de Longwy. Rolland joined the Société métallurgique de Gorcy in 1893 as a director. He became managing director of this company in 1894. He was the first engineer of the Corps des mines to hold such a position. Rolland became director (1891), vice-president (1896), then president (1901) of the Aciéries de Longwy at Mont-Saint-Martin, Meurthe-et-Moselle. (The company was run by the salaried managing director, Alexandre Dreux, a self-made man.)

Rolland was also a director of the Mines de Marles, Soudières Marcheville-Daguin et Cie, Mines de Moutiers, Mines de Valleroy, Comptoir métallurgique de Longwy and Comptoir d'exportation des Fontes de Meurthe-et-Moselle. He was president of the Société des tramways de Longwy. He was a member, then president, of the council of Briey, but was forced to resign in 1900 for health reasons. In 1903 he became a member of the board of the Comité des forges.

Georges Rolland suffered from a lingering disease in his later years that increasingly restricted his activity and would eventually cause his death. He died near Gorcy, Meurthe-et-Moselle, on 25 July 1910, aged 58.

== Awards ==
Georges Rolland was given the title of Knight of the Legion of Honour at the age of 32 for his work in the Sahara. He was appointed an officer of Public Instruction, an officer of Agricultural Merit and Commander of Nicham. In December 1897 he was elected an honorary member of the Société nationale d'agriculture, in the mechanical agriculture and irrigation section. In 1898 he was awarded the rosette of Office of the Legion of Honour. His detailed geological map of the Briey deposits was exhibited at the Exposition Universelle (1900) and won a Grand Prix. Shortly before his death the French Academy of Sciences awarded him its gold medal for his contribution to the discover of the Briey Basin.

== Publications ==
- Georges Rolland (1878), La métallurgie du mercure en Californie, Société d'encouragement pour l'industrie nationale
- Georges Rolland (25 June 1880), "Les éléments de trafic d'un chemin de fer entre Biskra et Ouargla", Chemin de fer transsaharien, Mission Choisy, étude des lignes de Biskra à Laghouat via Ouargla et El Goléah, Rapport provisoire, Paris: Imprimerie nationale
- Georges François Joseph Rolland (1880), Mission trans-saharienne de Laghouat-El Goleah - Ouargla - Biskra. Géologie et hydrologie: Note tirée du rapport provisoire, adresse à la date du 10 juin 1880, par M. Choisy, Ingénieur en chef des Ponts et Chaussées, à M. le Ministre des Travaux Publics, Dunod
- Georges Rolland (1881), "Carte géologique du Sahara, du Maroc à la Tripolitaine et de l'Atlas en Ahaggar", Bulletin de la Société Géologique de France (map), 8e Série, IX, Paris: impr. de Becquet: pl. XIII
- Georges Rolland (1894), Hydrologie du Sahara Algérien par Georges Rolland: Texte. Extrait des documents relatifs à la Mission de Laghouat-El-Goléa-Ouargla-Biskra. Publiés par le ministère des travaux publics. Rapport hydrologique, Imprimerie Nationale
- Aristide Horace Letourneux; Ernest Cosson; Napoléon Doumet-Adanson; Alphonse Marie Ferdinand Rouire; Georges François Joseph Rolland (1885), Le projet de création en Algérie et en Tunisie d'une mer dite intérieure, devant le Congrès de Blois, Association française pour l'avancement des sciences
- Georges Rolland (1886), Carte du Sahara septentrional (map), Tours: imp. de Arrault
- Georges Rolland (1887), L'Oued Rir' et la colonisation française au Sahara, par M. G. Rolland,..., au siège de la Société de géographie commerciale
- Georges Rolland, Note sur le régime des eaux artésiennes de la région d'El Goléa, 1887?
- Georges Rolland (17 May 1888), Envoi du compte rendu d'un voyage à Touggourt
- Georges Rolland (1888), La Colonisation française au Sahara. L'Oued Rir'. Le chemin de fer de Biskra-Tougourt-Ouargla, Chaix
- Georges Rolland (1888), Géologie de la région du lac de Kelbia et du littoral de la Tunisie centrale, Lagny
- Georges Rolland (1889), La conquête du désert, Biskra - Tougourt, l'Oued Rir', Challamel
- Georges Rolland (1890), "Géologie et hydrologie du sahara algérien, Imprimerie nationale (Paris)", Lilliad - Université de Lille - Sciences et Technologies, archived from the original on 2017-07-29
- Georges Rolland (1890), "Géologie du Sahara algérien et aperçu sur le Sahara de l'océan Atlantique à la mer Rouge", Lilliad - Université de Lille - Sciences et Technologies, Paris: Imprimerie nationale: 275, hdl:1908/3782
- Georges Rolland (14 June 1890), "L'Afrique française. Ce qu'elle est, ce qu'elle doit être", L'Économiste (map)
- Philebert (général); Georges Rolland (1890), La France en Afrique et le Transsaharien: l'intérieur Africain, ce que peut étre encore l'Afrique française, pénétration par l'Algérie, question Touareg, chemin de fer Transsaharien, A. Challamel
- Georges Rolland (1891), Le Transsaharien: un an après, A. Challamel
- Georges Rolland (1894), "Hydrologie du Sahara Algérien. Extrait des documents relatifs à la Mission de Laghouat-El-Goléa-Ouargla-Biskra. Publiés par le ministère des travaux publics. Rapport hydrologique", Lilliad - Université de Lille - Sciences et Technologies, Imprimerie Nationale: 425, hdl:1908/3784

== Sources ==
- "Aciéries de Longwy", industrie.lu - D'Industriegeschicht vu Lëtzebuerg
- Bassett, Thomas J. (July 1994), "Cartography and Empire Building in Nineteenth-Century West Africa", Geographical Review, 84 (3), American Geographical Society: 316–335, Bibcode:1994GeoRv..84..316B, doi:10.2307/215456, JSTOR 215456
- Burollet, Pierre F. (21 June 1995), L'exploration de la Tunisie avant la première guerre mondiale (in French), Comité Français d'Histoire de la Géologie (COFRHIGEO) (séance du 21 juin 1995)
- Cassis, Youssef (January–March 1998), "Grand Patronat et Performances Économiques : L'Allemagne, L'Angleterre et la France au XXe Siecle", Histoire, Économie et Société, 17 (1, Industrialisation Et Société En Europe Occidentale (1880–1970) : Nouveaux Aperçus), Armand Colin: 139–156, doi:10.3406/hes.1998.1978, JSTOR 23613252
- Chevalier, E. (November 1910), "Georges Rolland", Bulletin de l'Association des Anciens élèves de l'École des Mines de Paris (in French)
- Leger, Alain Y. (22 July 2017), "Société agricole et industrielle du Sud-Algérien (SAISA)" (PDF), Les entreprises coloniales françaises (in French)
- Mahl, Robert, "Georges François Joseph ROLLAND (1852-1910)", Les Annales des Mines (in French)
- Ney, Napoleon (1891), "The Proposed Trans-Saharian Railway", Scribner's Magazine, Charles Scribner's Sons
- Raphael, Lois A. C. (March 1944), "Dakar and the Desert Road", Political Science Quarterly, 59 (1), The Academy of Political Science: 15–29, doi:10.2307/2144697, JSTOR 2144697
- "Rolland, Georges", Patrons de France (in French), Système d'information sur le patronat français
- Tawadros, Edward (2011-11-02), Geology of North Africa, CRC Press, ISBN 978-0-415-87420-5
