= Darche =

Darche (/dɑːrʃ/; [daʁʃ]) is a surname. Notable people with the surname include:

- J. P. Darche (born 1975), American and Canadian football player
- Laetitia Darche (born 1991), Belgian-Mauritian beauty queen, Miss Mauritius
- Mathieu Darche (born 1976), Canadian ice hockey player
- Natalis Constant Darche (1856–1947), French army officer
- Noël Darche (1809–1874), farmer and political figure in Canada East
