= Justin Pouyanne =

French cartographer, explorer, and engineer

- Born: 5 September 1835; Pau, Pyrénées-Atlantiques, France
- Died: 22 November 1901 (aged 66); El Biar, Algiers, Algeria
- Occupations: Cartographer and explorer

Justin Pouyanne (5 September 1835 – 22 November 1901) was a French cartographer and explorer. He became an engineer, and served in Algeria for his entire career from 1859 to 1900, where he undertook extensive surveys.

== Life ==
Locations in Algeria

Justin Pouyanne was born in Pau, Pyrénées-Atlantiques, on 5 September 1835. He entered the École Polytechnique in November 1853, and was admitted to the École des Mines on 10 October 1855. He graduated on 18 June 1858, ranked 6th. He was appointed Engineer 3rd class on 8 July 1859, and served in Algeria from 10 April 1859. He would spend all his career in Algeria. At his own request he was assigned to the Tlemcen district in 1859.

Pouyanne was promoted to Engineer 2nd class on 7 February 1863 and Engineer 1st class on 1 February 1869. He married Louise Joséphine Dax. They had two sons, Armand Albert Pouyanne (1873–1931) and Charles Pouyanne (1884–1975), both of whom made their careers with the Corps des Ponts et Chaussées. He transferred to Algiers in 1873 as engineer. He was made a knight of the Legion of Honour on 7 February 1878. He was appointed Chief Engineer 2nd class on 8 June 1878.

The Trans-Saharan expedition was appointed in 1879 by Charles de Freycinet, Minister of Public Works, to investigate construction of a railway across the Sahara. Three possible routes starting from Oran in the west, Algiers in the center and Constantine in the east were to be examined by three expeditions. The western expedition was led by Justin Pouyanne and the central one was led by the engineer Auguste Choisy and included Georges Rolland. These two expeditions would complete their work without difficulty. The eastern route was considered the most dangerous, going via the Hoggar Tuareg town of Rhat. Paul Flatters was chosen as leader of this mission, which ended in disaster.

Pouyanne was promoted to Chief Engineer 1st class on 16 July 1883. He was made an officer of the Legion of Honour on 13 July 1892. Later, rather than leave Algeria he turned down a promotion to General Engineer. In 1897 the post of Inspector General for Algeria, based in Algiers, was created especially for him in recognition of his great merit. He retired in September 1900, and gave up the direction of the geological map, which he had been working on for 20 years. He died in El Biar, Algiers, on 22 November 1901.

== Publications ==
Publications by Justin Pouyanne include:

- Auguste Pomel; Justin Pouyanne (1876), Carte de l'Algérie dressée au dépôt de la guerre... Carte géologique provisoire des provinces d'Alger et d'Oran, Algiers: Adolphe Jourdan
- Pouyanne (1878), Exposition universelle de Paris en 1878. Départements d'Alger et d'Oran. Notice minéralogique, Algiers: impr. de J. Lavagne / Exposition internationale, p. 61
- Pouyanne (1880), "rapport sur le tracé de la voie", in Georges Rolland; Camille Sabatier (eds.), Chemin de fer transsaharien, Mission Choisy, étude des lignes de Biskra à Laghouat via Ouargla et El Goléah, "Rapport provisoire sur les travaux de la mission", Paris: Imprimerie nationale
- A. Pomel; J. Pouyanne (1882), Texte explicatif de la carte géographique provisoire au 1/800.000e des provinces d'Alger et d'Oran, Algiers: A. Jourdan, p. 56
- J. Pouyanne (1883), Note sur l'établissement de la carte au 1/2.000.000e de la région comprise entre le Touat et Timbouktou, Algiers: impr. de Cheniaux-Franville, p. 102
- Pomel, Auguste; Pouyanne, Justin (1885), Les echinides du Kef Ighoud, l'Association ouvrière, P. Fontana
- Pouyanne, chef de la mission; Clavenad; Baills (1886), Documents relatifs à la mission dirigée au sud de l'Algérie, Paris: Impr. nationale / Ministère des travaux publics, p. 228
- Auguste Pomel (1885–1889), Justin Pouyanne (ed.), Matériaux pour la carte géologique de l'Algérie 1er série, vol. 1–3, Algiers: impr. de l'association ouvrière
- Algérie. Service de la carte géologique (1891–1897), Auguste Pomel; Justin Pouyanne (eds.), Matériaux pour la carte géologique de l'Algérie 2e série, vol. 1–2, Algiers: impr. de P. Fontana

== Sources ==
- "Entré à l'Ecole le 10 octobre 1855", Eleves de l'Ecole des Mines de Paris ayant suivi le cycle de formation pour devenir ingénieur au corps des mines. 1840 - 1871 (in French), Annales des Mines
- Ficheur (1801), "Notice sur les Travaux Scientifiques de M. POUYANNE", Bulletin (in French), Société de géographie d'Alger.
- Garric, Alain, Justin POUYANNE (in French)
- Justin Pouyanne (1835-1901) (in French), BnF: Bibliotheque nationale de France
- "LH/2216/64 POUYANNE Justin", Leonore (in French), Ministry of Culture
- Ney, Napoleon (1891), "The Proposed Trans-Saharian Railway", Scribner's Magazine, Charles Scribner's Sons
- Strachan, John (2011), "Murder in the Desert: Soldiers, Settlers and the Flatters Expedition in the Politics and Historical Memory of European Colonial Algeria, 1830–1881" (PDF), French History and Civilization Papers from the George Rudé Seminar, 4: 2010 Seminar
