= Château de Longwy =

Ruined castle in Grand Est, France

Coordinates: 49.526°N 5.765°E

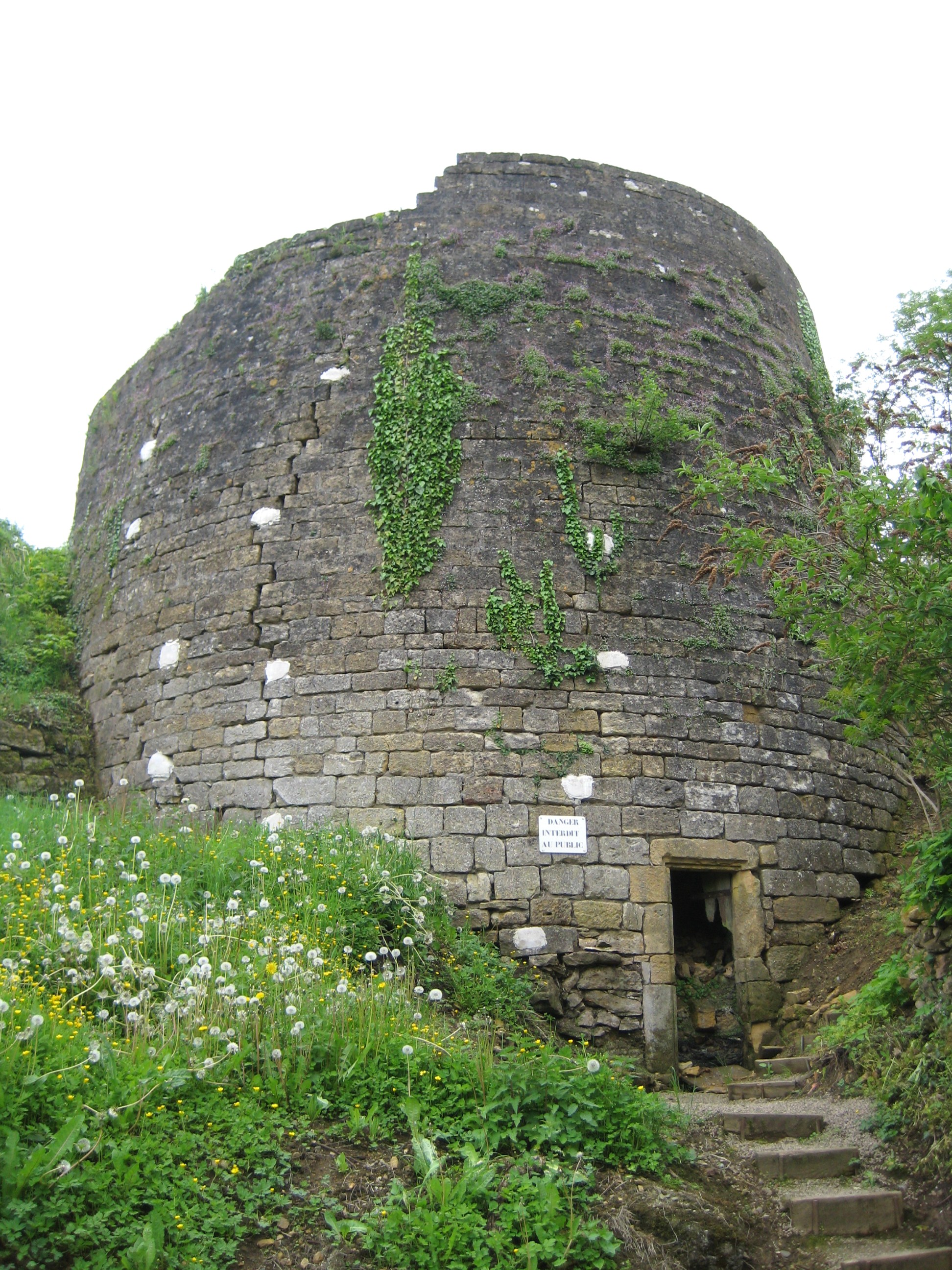

The Château de Longwy is a ruined castle, incorporated into the town's fortifications, in the commune of Longwy in the Meurthe-et-Moselle département of France.

== History ==
Dating probably from the 11th century, the castle passed at the end of the 12th century from the possession of the Counts of Bar to the Dukes of Lorraine. The Bars regained it in 1292 and held it until its destruction, making it the northernmost stronghold of their lands. It was taken by the French in 1646 and destroyed in 1672, at the same time as the rest of the town's fortifications, to permit the future construction of Longwy's stronghold. All that is left are remains of a tower which had probably been reconstructed in the 15th century (possibly the tour de (tower of) Malcouvert or Maucouvert mentioned in 16th century texts) situated at the extreme north of the site. The castle comprised 11 towers, a keep and two gates. It was constructed from limestone.

The remains of the castle and the 17th century fortifications designed by Vauban are listed as a monument historique by the French Ministry of Culture.

== See also ==
- List of castles in France
