= Paul Delisse =

French classical trombonist (1817–1888)

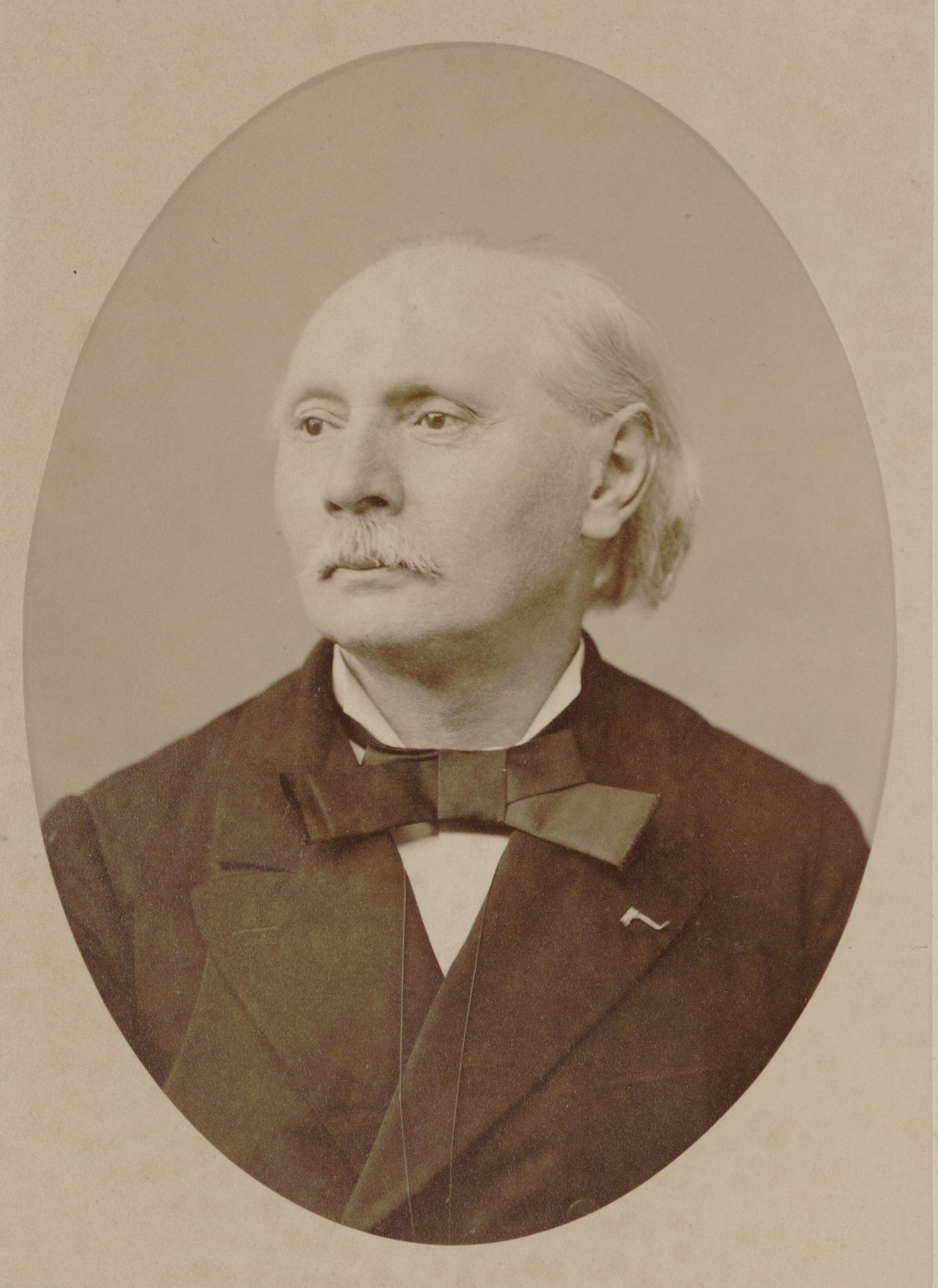
Delisse, c. 1880

Paul Lespagne Delisse (12 July 1817 – 8 September 1888) was a French classical trombonist.

== Biography ==
Born on 12 July 1817, in Longwy, département Meurthe et Moselle, Delisse became a soloist at the Opéra-Comique and the Orchestre de la Société des Concerts du Conservatoire. From 1871 to 1888 he was a trombone professor at the Conservatoire de Paris in succession to Antoine Dieppo. Delisse transcribed numerous works by classical and contemporary composers for trombone and piano.

He died on 8 September 1888, aged 71, in Paris.
