= Gorcy =

- Commune
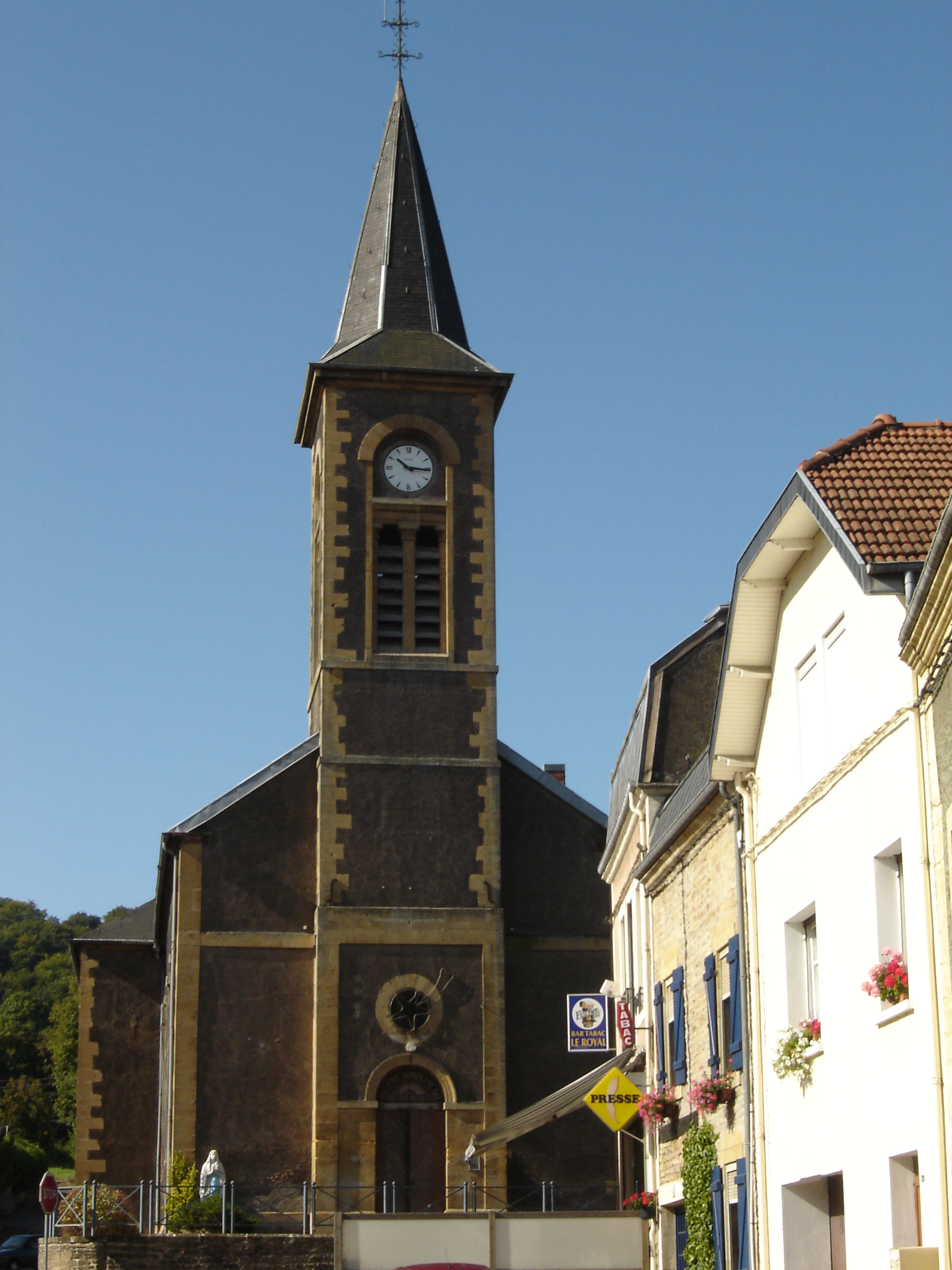
- Gorcy church

- Coat of arms
- Location of Gorcy
- Location within France Location within Grand Est
- Coordinates: 49°32′08″N 5°41′07″E
- Country: France
- Region: Grand Est
- Department: Meurthe-et-Moselle
- Arrondissement: Val-de-Briey
- Canton: Mont-Saint-Martin
- Intercommunality: Grand Longwy Agglomération

Government
  - Mayor (2020–2026): Bernard Fontaine
- Area^{1}: 4.1 km^{2} (1.6 sq mi)
- Highest elevation: 385 m (1,263 ft)
- Lowest elevation: 235 m (771 ft)
- Population (2023): 2,971
  - Density: 720/km^{2} (1,900/sq mi)
- Demonym: Gorcéens
- Time zone: UTC+01:00 (CET)
  - Summer (DST): UTC+02:00 (CEST)
- INSEE/Postal code: 54234 /54730
- ^{1} French Land Register data, which excludes lakes, ponds, glaciers > 1 km^{2} (0.386 sq mi or 247 acres) and river estuaries.

Gorcy (French pronunciation: [ɡɔʁsi]) is a commune, located in the department of Meurthe-et-Moselle and the Grand Est region, France. This village in the north of the Meurthe-et-Moselle is next to the Belgian frontier, and about 10 km from Longwy, main city of the "Pays-Haut".

Its inhabitants are named Gorcéens and Gorcéennes in French.

== History ==
Gorcy was part of the old Barrois province. The village Cussigny was attached to Gorcy in 1810.

Historical population

Year	Pop.	±% p.a.
1793	129	—
1800	115	−1.63%
1806	121	+0.85%
1821	237	+4.58%
1836	408	+3.69%
1841	423	+0.72%
1861	668	+2.31%
1866	657	−0.33%
1872	654	−0.08%
1876	799	+5.13%
1881	1,199	+8.46%
1886	861	−6.41%
1891	943	+1.84%
1896	1,053	+2.23%
1901	1,070	+0.32%
1906	1,124	+0.99%
1911	1,512	+6.11%

Year	Pop.	±% p.a.
1921	1,250	−1.88%
1926	1,520	+3.99%
1931	1,516	−0.05%
1936	1,350	−2.29%
1946	1,100	−2.03%
1954	1,462	+3.62%
1962	2,228	+5.41%
1968	2,364	+0.99%
1975	2,686	+1.84%
1982	2,473	−1.17%
1990	2,168	−1.63%
1999	2,130	−0.20%
2007	2,361	+1.30%
2012	2,529	+1.38%
2017	2,763	+1.79%
2023	2,971	+1.22%

1962 to 2023: Official population without duplicates. Sources: 1793-1999 EHESS, 1968-2023 INSEE.

=== Steel industry ===
In 1832, Jean Joseph Labbé built a first blast furnace in Gorcy, on the Parivaux. From 1846 to 1848, two new blast furnaces were built. The factory, partially destroyed during the war of 1870, is rebuilt and set in rights. In 1877, the two blast furnaces were removed and replaced by two other more powerful. Before World War I, the Société métallurgique de Gorcy still exploited two blast furnaces which disappeared in the 1930s.

== Places and monuments ==
- Industrialist's castle known as Château du Parivaux (Parivaux' Castle), built from 1898 to 1900, for Georges Rolland, husband of Marcelle Labbé, the "château du bas" were in this time inhabited by his brother-in-law Paul; bombarded in 1940, it was deleted in 1967, because there was too much renovation to do.
- Industrialist's castle known as Château bas, built from 1880 to 1883, for Jean-Joseph Labbé, founder of the Forges de Gorcy in 1832; gravely damaged by a bombardment in 1940, it was deleted in 1955, because there was too much renovations to do.
- Château de la Martinière, built in the start of the 17th century, maybe in 1603, in accordance with a date today disappeared, for Claude des Bernards, founder of the branch of Des Bernards of Gorcy; he came in the De la Martinière's family with a marriage in 1725, it was renovated in 1740, date carried by the pedestrian door of the main part; the moat surrounding the castle was filled in during 1855 and baskets of fruit hung from the columns of the old entry gate from the old Château du Pulventeux in Longwy-Haut.
- Castle known as Château des Gorcy. Strong house of the Gorcys maybe built in the 16th century, badly damaged in 1671 by the troops of Marshal De Créqui, renovated in the 18th century, extended toward south in the 19th century, and became a property of the Labbé's family. It was given to the commune completely redone in 1979, and is currently the town hall.
- The military cemetery, where the Maréchal Foch's son is buried. It's near to the frontier. In this cemetery, is also buried René Viviani's son, Council president from 1914 to 1918
- The Cussignère marsh, a wood bridge cross it and link France to Belgium.
- The monument to the war dead
- The walk along of the river Coulmy.

== Religious building ==
- Parish church Saint-Jean-Baptiste; the parish depended on the Musson's church (in Belgium) until 1785); since then, the exercise of the congregation is in the cadastral chapel of M. Maillard de la Martinière; became too little and too damaged, it was replaced in 1837 by a church, built with the Bauchet's plan, architect in Briey; it is extended and renovated in 1896 with the L. Lanternier's plan, architect in Nancy. It was consecrated in 1898.

== Events ==
- Fête de la Cussignère (latest October week-end) : international eco-fair of biological products
- Annual tournament of soccer.

== See also ==
- Communes of the Meurthe-et-Moselle department
