= Aciéries de Longwy =

Société des aciéries de Longwy
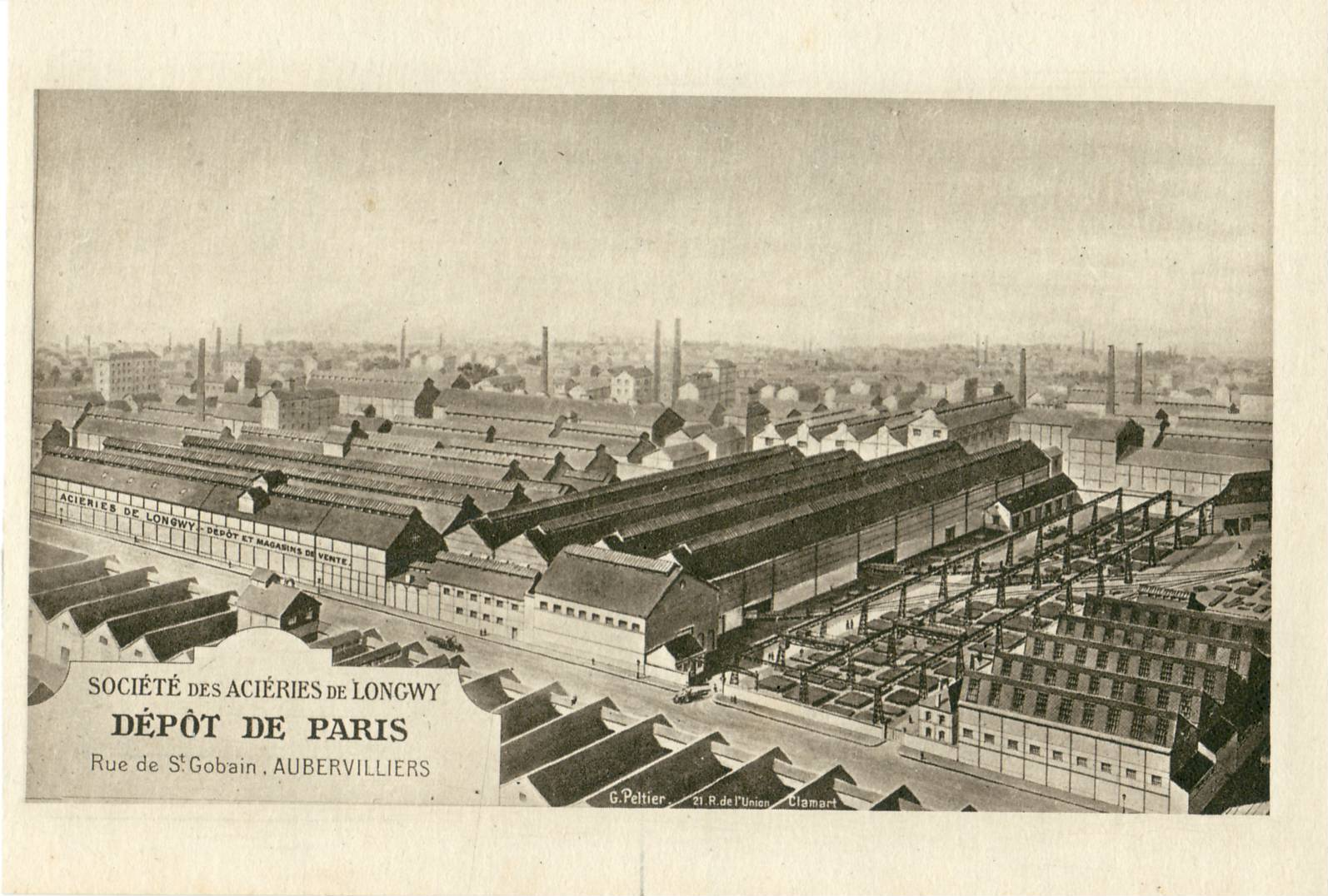
- Aubervilliers plant
- Industry: Steel
- Genre: Manufacturer
- Headquarters: Longwy, Meurthe-et-Moselle, France

The Société des aciéries de Longwy (Longwy Steelworks Co.) was a steelworks located in Longwy, Meurthe-et-Moselle, France. In 1881 the company bought the Moulaine blast furnace and mine, and the first Mont-Saint-Martin steel plant went into operation in 1883.

== Foundation ==
Headquarters location in France

The Société des Aciéries de Longwy was founded on 1 June 1880 by a merger of the Usine du Prieuré and the Usine Port-Sec in Mont-Saint-Martin. Baron Renaud Oscar d'Adelswärd (1811–98) was president, and contributed the Usine du Prieuré of Mont-Saint-Martin and the concession of the iron mines of Herserange. Jean-Joseph Labbé was vice-president and brought the Usine Port-Sec of Mont-Saint-Martin. Labbé and Adelsward had previously co-founded the Comptoir de Longwy in 1876, with Alexandre Dreux as the first executive director. He was a poor farmer's son who had worked as a clerk at a foundry in Le Mans, then as an accountant for the foundry owner Armand Chappée, who recommended him.

Members of the Aciéries de Longwy board were Baron Gustave Oscar d'Adelswärd (1843–95), Count Fernand de Saintignon, Gustave Raty, Jean-Alfred Labbé, Baron Hippolyte d'Huart, Baron Fernand d'Huart and Robert de Wendel. De Wendel was master of the foundries of Hayange, Moyeuvre, Stiring-Wendel and Jœuf, and granted a sub-license for the Thomas process to the Aciéries de Longwy.

== Pre-war period 1880–1914 ==
In 1881 the company bought the Moulaine blast furnace and mine. On 19 February 1883 the first Mont-Saint-Martin steel plant went into operation. In the early years the Aciéries de Longwy suffered from technical difficulties and a reduced demand for rails. The company hired Charles Walrand from Le Creusot as technical director, an expert in steel technology, but were still unable to produce steel rails with the quality demanded by the Chemins de fer de Paris à Lyon et à la Méditerranée. In 1887 the company started to produce wire and sheet metal, but continued to lose money. Alexandre Dreux was made general manager in 1888. Dreux at once cut back costs and obtained a large contract to supply rails, making the company profitable within a year.

The company exhibited at the Paris Exposition of 1889, where they illustrated manufacture of slag phosphate as a fertilizer. The company was producing 60 tons per day of this finely ground slag, useful for soils poor in iron and lime. In 1889 the company had 1,592 employees and workmen, six iron mines, seven blast furnaces, three 15 ton basic converters, as well as rolling mills, shops, foundries and other facilities. Its annual production was 86,520 tons of Thomas pig-iron, 22,722 tons of other pig iron and 70,653 tons of steel of all kinds. The steel contained from 0.05% to 0.10% phosphorus, with traces of sulphur. The first Martin steel casting was in 1890.

The Lorraine steel industry grew rapidly from 1893 to 1913. Dreux undertook a series of upgrades to the plant, adding new blast furnaces to supply molten pig iron to six basic Bessemer converters at Mont-Saint-Martin. As of 1 May 1901 there were seven blast furnaces. Dreux set up Siemens-Martin open hearth furnaces to make special steels, and mills to roll steel into different forms. Georges Rolland of the Corps des mines was made President of the Aciéries de Longwy in 1903. That year he also became a member of the board of the Comité des forges.

There were several strikes in the Longwy basin in 1905. At a strike of the Aciéries de Longwy workers in early September the workers met in Gouraincourt and demanded freedom to for a union, rehiring of workers who had been sacked for strike work, suppression of piece work and pay every 15 days. Troops were sent in to restore order. The workers marched from Mont-Saint-Martin to Longwy on 12 September, and during the march a Belgian worker was killed by a blow from a soldier's lance. Despite a huge funeral for the dead worker, and inflammatory speeches by Alphonse Merrheim, the strike soon ended with few concessions by the owners.

The Aciéries de Longwy in 1913 had 7,000 workers. It was the third-largest French pig iron producer at 390,000 tons, and the second largest steel producer at 345,000 tons. In 1914 the company participated in creating the Société Anonyme des Produits Réfractaires de Longwy.

== Inter-war period 1918–39 ==
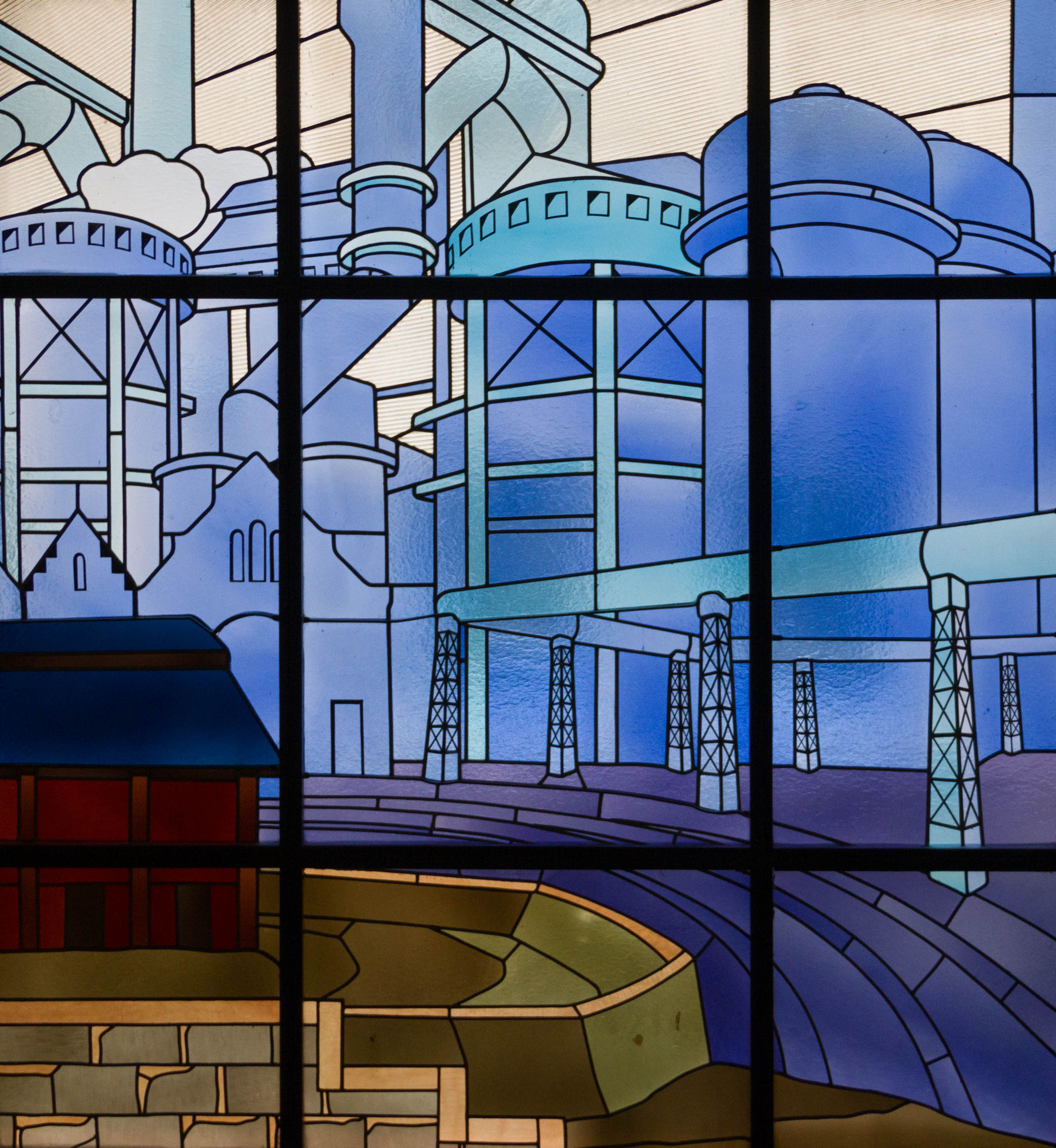
Stained glass window in the former Longwy steel factory by Louis Majorelle (1928)

Dreux remained in charge of Aciéries de Longwy until he retired in 1919 and was succeeded by his son, Edouard. After Edouard died prematurely in 1923 he returned to run the operation for another ten years. After World War I (1914–18) there was a ten-year reconstruction period, starting with reopening of the iron mines in 1919. About a third of the equipment that the Germans had taken during the war was recovered and reinstalled, and in 1920 two blast furnaces, a Thomas converter and a rolling mill started operation. Following this, new equipment was installed to bring up capacity to prewar levels by 1924. From 1925 to 1929 the facilities were upgraded and expanded. Blast furnaces with capacity of 300 tons per day gave the steelworks annual capacity of 760,000 tons of pig iron and steel.

Immediately after the war Aciéries de Longwy and its partners founded the Sociéte Lorraine Minière et Métallurgique to take over the Röchling steelworks at Thionville and 40% of the Röchlingische Eisen und Stahlwerke in the Saar. However, the French now had far greater steel making capacity than was needed domestically, and were unsuccessful in penetrating the German market. Further, the Germans developed new sources of iron ore to eliminate dependence on Lorraine, and used coal from the Ruhr for their own steel industry, depriving the Lorraine foundries of this crucial source of fuel. This led eventually to a settlement in which the French obtained a sufficient supply of Ruhr coal.

In the 1930s the Aciéries de Longwy owned four iron ore mines, and was part-owner of four more. The Thionville plant was purchased in 1933. In 1939 the company had nine blast furnaces in Port Sec, Prieuré and Moulaine.

== Post-World War II 1945–53 ==
In 1948 the Aciéries de Longwy had a major plant in Thionville with four blast furnaces and three electric furnaces. The Société Lorraine de Laminage Continu (Sollac) was established in December 1948. It included the three de Wendel companies: Les Petits-Fils de François De Wendel, De Wendel & Cie and Forges et Aciéries de Gueugnon. The other Lorraine producers were Aciéries de Rombas, UCPMI de Hagondange, Société des Aciéries de Longwy and the Forges et aciéries de la marine et d'Homécourt. Two non-Lorraine companies that would further process the Sollac products were included, Forges et Aciéries de Dilling (in the Saar) and J.-J. Carnaud et Forges de Basse-Indre. Production began on 23 December 1949 in a continuous-strip steel mill at Sérémange near to Hayange. In 1950 the company formed an association with Continental Foundry and Machines for manufacture of pilger rolls for continuous mills.

In 1953 the Société Lorraine-Escaut was founded through a merger of the Société des Aciéries de Longwy, Société Métallurique de Senelle-Maubeuge and the Société Escaut et Meuse.

== Sources ==
- "Aciéries de Longwy", industrie.lu - D'Industriegeschicht vu Lëtzebuerg
- Bonin, Hubert; Goey, Ferry de (2009), American Firms in Europe: Strategy, Identity, Perception and Performance (1880-1980), Librairie Droz, ISBN 978-2-600-01259-1
- Chamberlin, Edward H. (2015-12-31), International Economic Association Monopoly and Competition Regulation, Palgrave Macmillan UK, ISBN 978-1-349-08434-0
- James, Harold (2006), FAMILY CAPITALISM, Harvard University Press, ISBN 978-0-674-02181-5
- Papayanis, N. (2012-12-06), Alphonse Merrheim: The Emergence of Reformism in Revolutionary Syndicalism, 1871 – 1925, Springer Science & Business Media, ISBN 978-94-009-5155-6
- "Rolland, Georges", Patrons de France (in French), Système d'information sur le patronat français
- Smith, Michael Stephen (2006), The Emergence of Modern Business Enterprise in France, 1800-1930, Harvard University Press, ISBN 978-0-674-01939-3
- US Commission to the Paris exposition, 1889 (1891), Fine arts, education and liberal arts; furniture; textile fabrics and wearing apparel; extractive arts; raw and manufactured products; hygiene, U.S. Government Printing Office
