= Armand Chappée =

French politician (1835–1922)

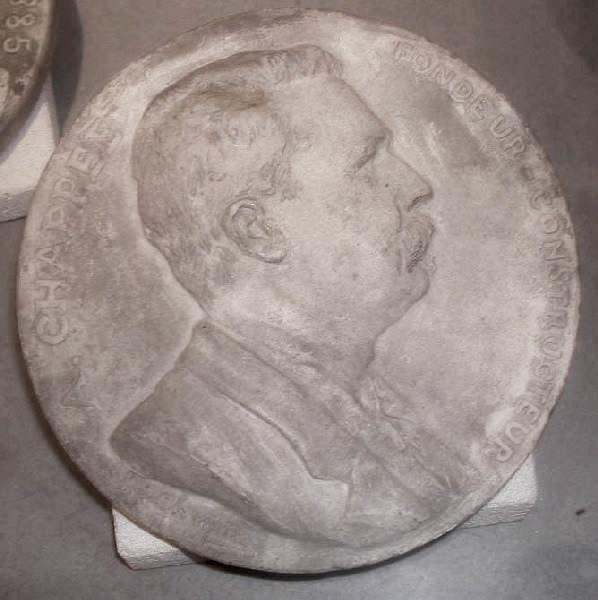
- 1889 medallion of Chappée by Henri Chapu
- Born: Armand-Alexandre Chappée; 30 April 1835; Auteuil, Oise, France
- Died: 22 September 1922 (aged 87); Le Mans, France
- Occupation: Iron master

Armand Chappée (30 April 1835 – 22 September 1922) was a French iron master, founder of the Chappée group. He was the son of a grocer, found work as an accountant at an iron foundry near Le Mans, married the owner's daughter and became owner in turn. He built up the factory, introduced modern technology and made the Chappée brand of cast iron products widely recognised. He was a paternalistic employer who provided many benefits to his workers. His political views were described as "militant reactionary".

== Background: Doré, Chevé et Cie ==
The Antoigné factory, which would become the Chappée factory, was in the commune of Sainte-Jamme on the Sarthe River 13 kilometres (8.1 mi) from Le Mans. A forge had been established here in 1618, and had operated with the same technology until the 19th century, but in the early 19th century faced growing competition from more modern forges. The blast furnace at Antoigné was closed in 1822. In 1827, the iron master Charles Drouet restructured the works and in 1829 began to produce cast iron mouldings. The business struggled, and the Antoigné forge was again closed in 1843.

Victor Doré, who had worked in the Antoigné forge, formed a partnership with Joseph Chevé, and in 1841 they founded the Saint-Pavin factory in Le Mans to smelt all types of metal. In 1845, the enterprise became "Doré, Chevé et Cie". In December 1854, they leased the Antoigné forge and decided to rebuild the blast furnace, at first only to feed the Saint-Pavin foundry. A railway station was opened in Le Mans on 28 May 1854. In 1855, the partners rebuilt the Antoigné blast furnace and created a moulding workshop. By 1856, it was producing four or five tons of gray cast iron daily, some of which was cast into bearings for the Le Mans-Rennes railway line, and some sent to the Saint-Pavin factory in Le Mans for secondary casting.

Locations in France

== Life ==
Armand-Alexandre Chappée was born in Auteuil, Oise, on April 30, 1835, son of Michel Alexandre Chappée, a grocer and Sophie-Joséphine Doré. His mother was first cousin of Victor Doré. Armand Chappée began work in agriculture, then in 1856 became secretary-accountant at the Antoigné factory. He married his second cousin Victoire Julienne Doré, eldest daughter of Victor Doré, on 7 September 1858. He joined the company with 20,000 francs from his parents and a dowry of 40,000 francs from his wife. Chappée soon became the closest partner of his father in law. In 1860, Joseph Chevé left the company. That year, the charcoal blast furnace, destroyed by a fire, was replaced by cupola furnaces which remelted English cast iron. At the start of 1861 the workforce had dropped from 111 to 70 workers, mostly producing pipes, but by June 1862 there were 166 workers, including 28 women and 6 children, and by 1872 there were 200 workers.

In 1867, Doré was made a knight of the Legion of Honour. He had two daughters, the second of whom married a M. Martin. Doré divided his company between his two sons in law, and Chappée received the Antoigné factory. The factory had been modernized, and working hours had been reduced to 11 hours per day, from 6 am to 6 pm with an hour for lunch at noon. There were also rotating night shifts of no more than 12 hours. Women worked only 9 hours per day. As of 1889, the Antoigné factory was connected by a 2 kilometres (1.2 mi) steam tramway to the Montbizot station on the railway from Le Mans to Caen. It included foundry, forge and construction workshops. It specialized in manufacturing water and gas piping, building and mechanical parts, railway and tramway equipment, bearings, turntables, railway changes and crossovers, hydraulic cranes etc. It had hydraulic motors of about 200 horsepower, backed up by steam engines in case of drought or excess water. Chappée was the sole owner.

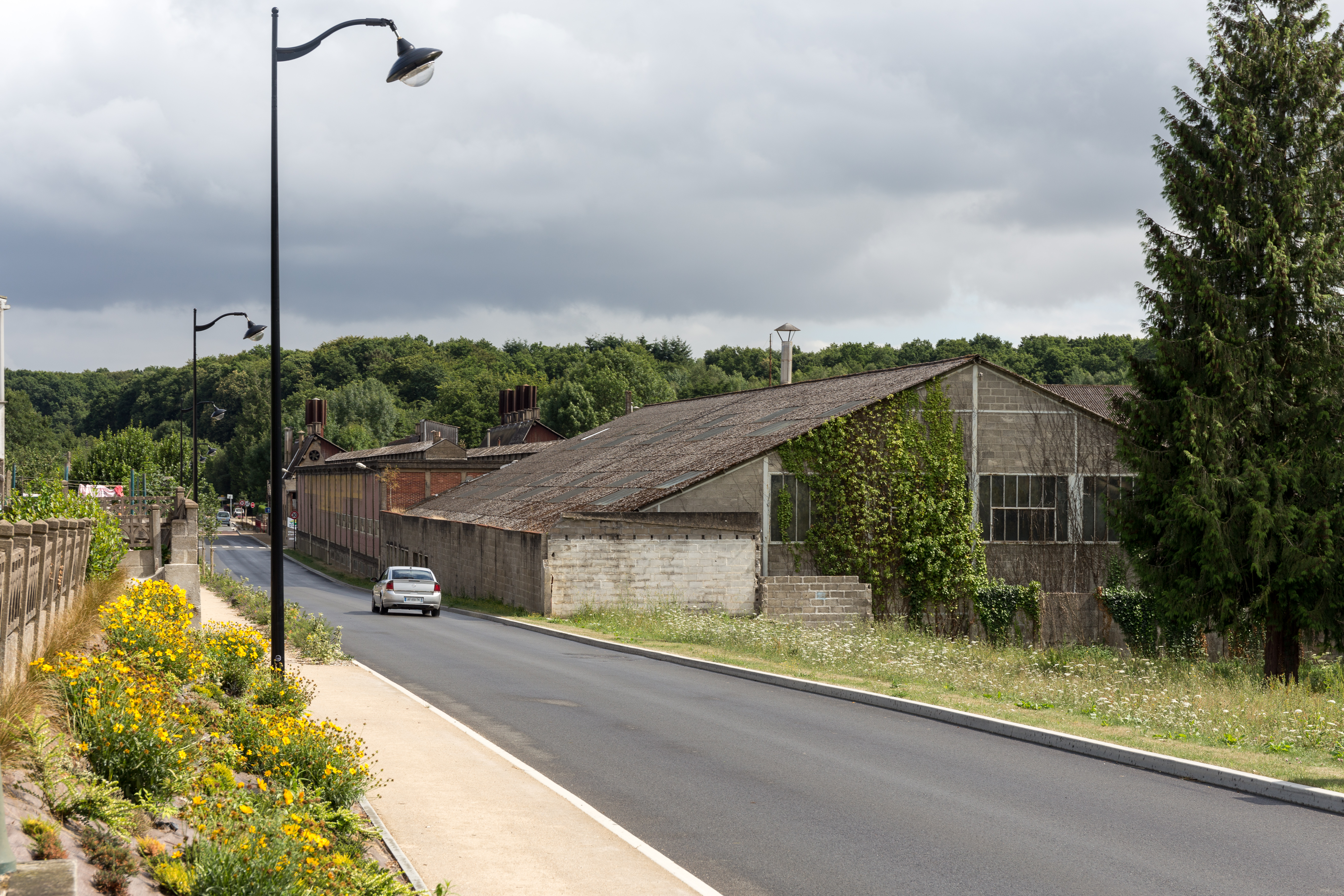
Old foundry at Port-Brillet

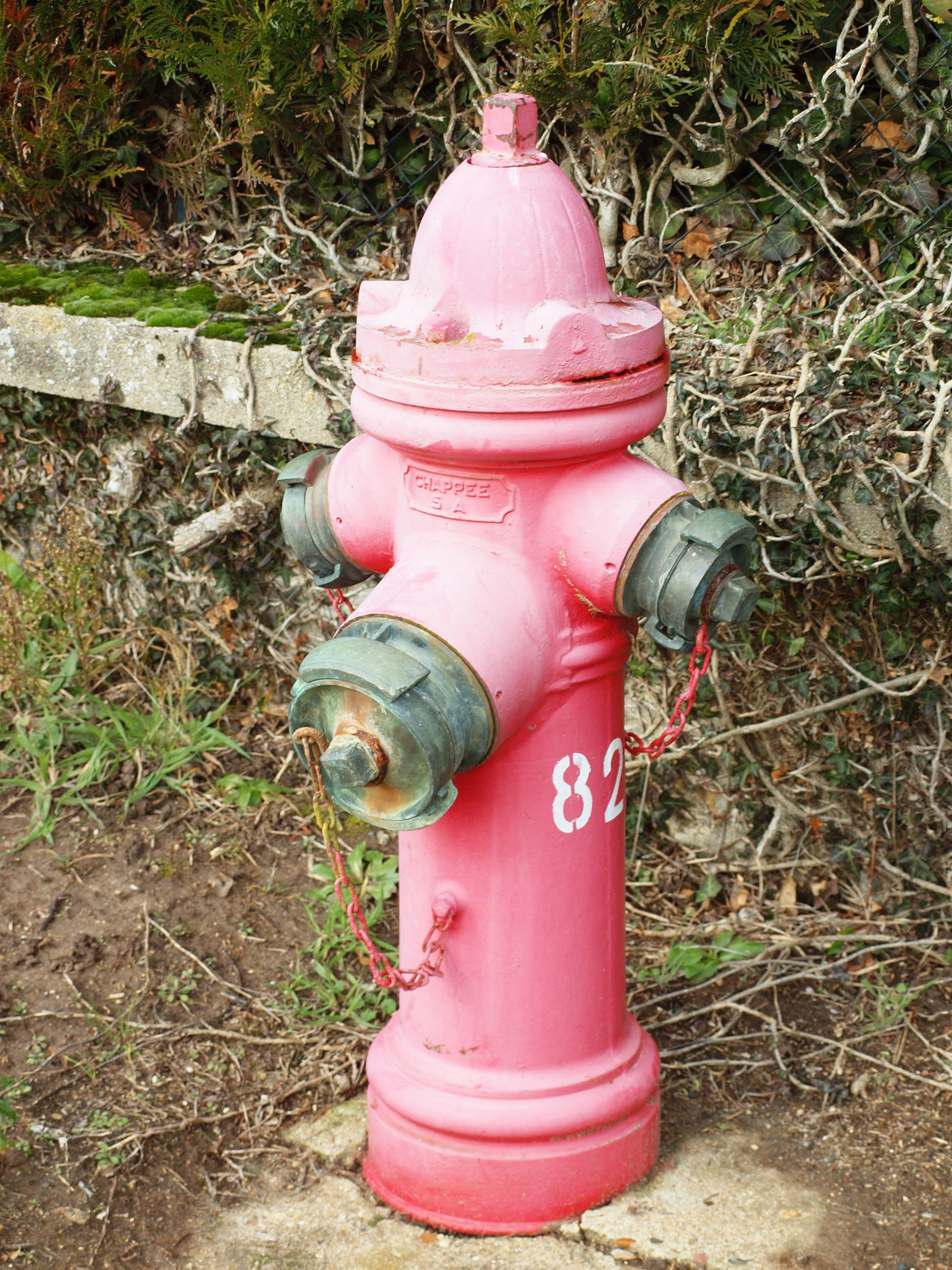
Chappée fire hydrant

In 1882, Chappée bought the factory at Port-Brillet, Mayenne, from Paillard-Ducléré et Cie. That year, the Port-Brillet facility produced 100 tons of castings daily. Chappée undertook a major expansion. Port-Brillet foundry had been built by Michel de Guerne in 1619, with water-powered forges coming into operation in 1623. (Note: The Port-Brillet forge was originally created by the Duke of Trémoille in 1619 to replace an older forge using only hydroelectric power that dated back to at least the 15th century. The forge was beside a small stream, the Vicoin, which was dammed to form a 36 hectares (89 acres) reservoir. Water power drove paddle wheels that in turn powered large bellows in two blast furnaces. A huge hammer, powered by another water wheel, consolidated the cast iron into bars. These were then taken to the smithy for further processing. Around the workshops at the foot of the dam there were warehouses, shops, a chapel and workmen's dewllings. Very little changed until 1865, when the factory was modernized and turned into a foundry of first and second fusion.) The factory at Port-Brillet was on the line from Paris to Brest. For a long time it was an iron forge, and only became a foundry around 1840. At the time of the 1889 Exposition Universelle the factory was engaged in secondary melting and produced light products such as pots, stoves, irons and other commercial goods. It was powered by a hydraulic force of 80 horsepower. The water rarely failed, but a steam engine was available as a back-up power supply. There were about 250 workers, including about 10 women.

The industrialists of Normandy, Maine and Anjou did little to promote their products, rarely exhibiting them outside their region, and rarely filing patents. Armand Chappée was one of three entrepreneurs from Sarthe who accounted for almost 90% of patents in the region in the 1880s, the other two being the hemp-weaver Louis-Antoine Bary and Ernest-Sylvain Bollée. The Chappée products won prizes in Angers (1871), Paris (1878), Le Mans (1880), Sidney (1880), Melbourne (1881), Paris (1881), Blois (1883), Caen (1883) and Amsterdam (1889).

Chappée's exhibit at the Exposition Universelle (1889) won a Grand Prix. The display was almost 8 metres (26 ft) across and showed all the company's products. The centerpiece was a cast iron reproduction of a monumental fountain in Louis XVI style, with a basin from which a nymph emerged spilling water from an urn. Around this, in carefully arranged disarray, were cast iron pots, irons, weights for scales, fireplace grills, small stoves, boxes, copying presses, sewer grills, locks, umbrella stands, fire hydrants and valves. There were many pipes, a candelabra, washtub, bakery oven, screw press, gargoyles, feet for garden benches and many other objects. Elsewhere, the company exhibited a mobile oven on wheels that was used by the army to cook meat, but could also be used for bakery and other types of food.

The company now had customers throughout France and in many foreign markets. The number of workers at Antoigné rose from almost 200 in 1874 to 600 in 1900 and 1,000 in 1910. At Port-Brillet the number of workers rose from 90 in 1882 to 600 in 1900 and 800 in 1910. In 1895, Armand and his son Louis founded the company Armand Chappée et fils. Armand Chappee at Fils was one of several foundries in France that used pig iron made by others. This was known as moulage de fonte en seconde fusion. The two plants made many types of iron pipe, radiators, pumps, kitchenware, motor blocks and decorative ironwork. Around 1900, Chappée's factories began to produce central heating boilers, to be placed in the cellar, and cast iron radiators.

== Paternalism ==
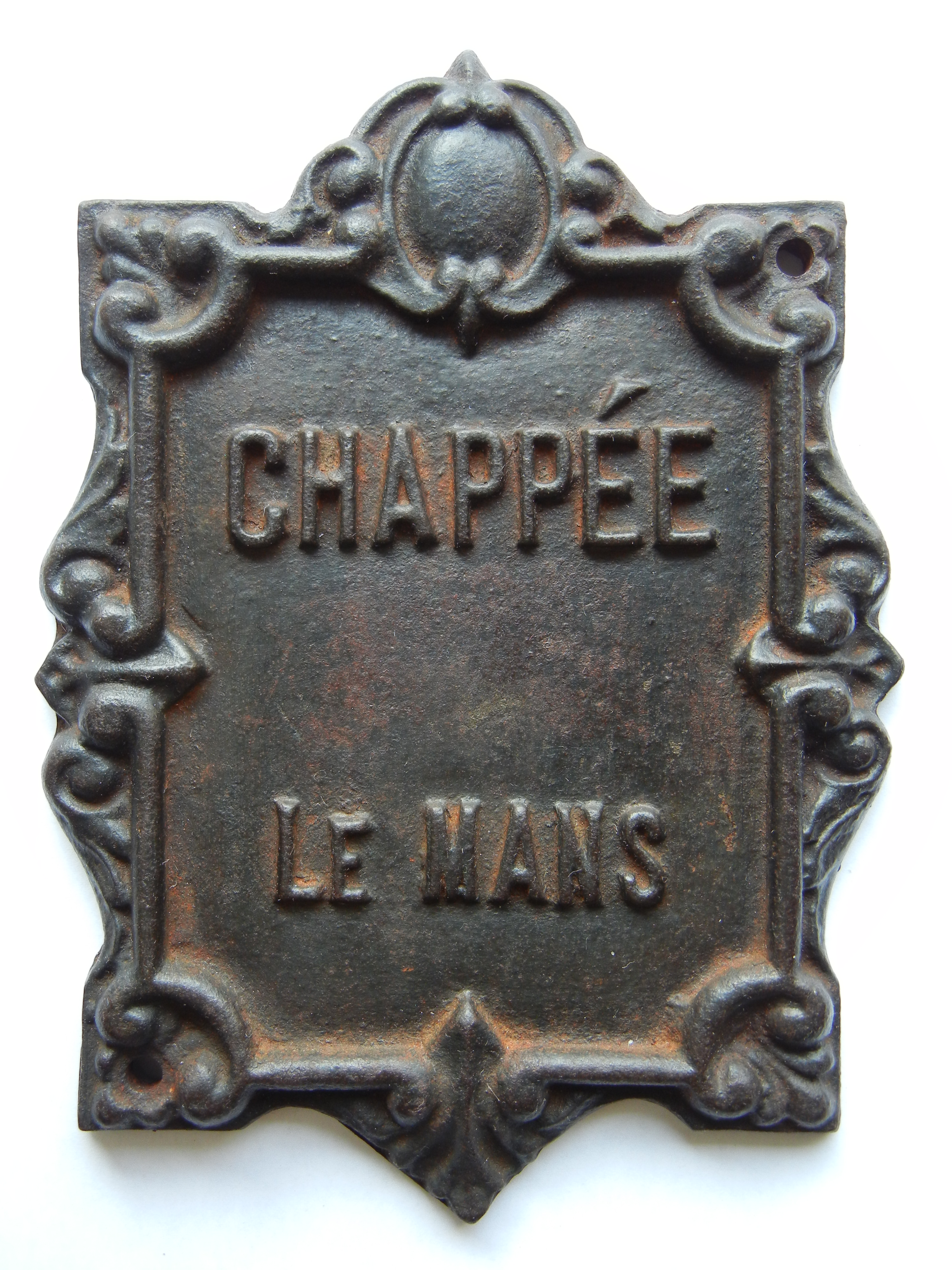
Chappée nameplate

Chappée was a paternalistic employer. He provided housing for the workers, undertook measures to make the factories safer, created first aid stations, set up a fire brigade, provided apprenticeships and gave evening classes for office workers. The factories also provided schools, children's day care centers, sporting, musical and artistic societies, a savings bank system and retirement pensions. Workers had to pay 5 francs to join the Mutual Aid society, and then a monthly subscription of 1 franc for men and 0.50 francs for women. In case of sickness of injury, men received 1 franc per day and women 0.50 francs per day. Members were entitled to free medical care and medicines. In the event of death, the company was responsible for burial expenses. Workers who did not join the Mutual Aid society paid into a medical fund to cover medical care and medicines. The workers voted to make the medical fund compulsory.

On 15 May 1884 Chappee decided to give a pension of 365 francs per year to every worker aged over 60 who had worked for 30 years for the company, and 150 francs per year for every worker aged over 60 who had worked for 20 years. The pension was paid monthly for life after the employee stopped working. The worker had to be a member of the Mutual Aid society to qualify. The workers at Port-Brillet were covered by the decision of 15 May 1884 and at the age of 60 gained the right to a pension if they had worked there for 20 years. When a worker was the victim of a workplace accident that permanently disabled him, a pension was set up for him according to his needs, reduced by a percentage as each of his children reached age 18. The pension would be paid to his widow, but stopped as soon as she remarried. The prefect of Sarthe called Chappée a "militant reactionary" in 1889, but there is no question that his paternalism was of benefit to his employees.

== Other activities ==
Chappée became director of the Sarthe Tramways, Loir-et-Cher Tramways, French Narrow Gauge Railway Company and Genest anthracite mines. He was president of the General Syndicate of Foundry Owners. Alexandre Dreux joined the commercial service of Chappée's company around 1871 at age 18, where Chappée spotted his ability and capacity for work. Chappée placed him as accountant at a subsidiary forge he operated in Redon, Ille-et-Vilaine, but soon closed it. In 1877, Chappée recommended Dreux to the leaders of the Lorraine steel industry who were looking for someone to manage their comptoir. Renaud Oscar d'Adelswärd and Jean-Joseph Labbé co-founded the Comptoir Métallurgique de Longwy in 1876, with Alexandre Dreux as the first executive director. The Comptoir de Longwy was the first joint sales organization of the French steel industry.

Chappée was a member of the Superior Labour Council for several years. In 1885, he joined the Le Mans Chamber of Commerce, for which he was secretary in 1888 and president in 1904. He was an inspector of technical education, and founded and supported the Le Mans professional school. He was an administrator of the Bank of France until his death. He was Mayor of Sainte-Jamme from 1861 to 1871 and from 1878 to 1900. In 1887, he ran for election as general councilor for the Ballon canton, but failed.

Chappée was compromised in the very public scandal of the Talvende bank. Felix Talvende, the director of the bank, was arrested for bankruptcy on 18 March 1889. He was charged with excessive personal expenses, engaging in contracts he could not satisfy and providing inaccurate accounts, and sentenced to eight months in prison. Chappée was a member of the bank's board of directors, and had to testify as a witness at the trial. He was made a knight of the Legion of Honour on 11 July 1891, but was never promoted to officer of the Legion.

Armand Chappée died on 22 September 1922. After his death his two sons, Jules and Louis, squabbled over the company. In 1929, the Antoigné and Port-Brillet factories were merged with the Société Générale de Fonderie. The forges finally closed in 2011.

== Sources ==
- Barjot, Dominique (2003), Les entrepreneurs du second empire, Presses Paris Sorbonne, ISBN 978-2-84050-293-7
- Beaucarnot, Jean-Louis (2010-11-10), Entrons chez nos ancêtres, JC Lattès, ISBN 978-2-7096-3607-0
- Gregoire, Patrice (1988), Dominique Barjot (ed.), "Armand Chappée (1835-1922), grand patron sarthois" (PDF), Annales de Normandie Année (in French), 38^{e} année (2–3)
- Lambert-Dansette, Jean (2009-07-01), Histoire de l'entreprise et des chefs d'entreprise en France: L'entreprise entre deux siècles (1880-1914) - Les rayons et les ombres - (in French), Editions L'Harmattan, ISBN 978-2-296-23159-7
- Laur, Francis (1890), Les mines et usines en 1889: étude complète sur l'Exposition universelle de 1889 (in French), F. Laur
- "L'union des commerçants et artisans (UCA)language=fr", Ouest - France, 9 October 2012, archived from the original on 28 December 2017
- Moine, Jean-Marie (1990), "Une aristocratie industrielle : les maîtres de forges en Lorraine" (PDF), Romantisme (in French), 20 (70. La noblesse): 69–79, doi:10.3406/roman.1990.5700
- Smith, Michael Stephen (2006), The Emergence of Modern Business Enterprise in France, 1800-1930, Harvard University Press, ISBN 978-0-674-01939-3
- Verron, Guy (January–March 1967), "Les structures sociales d'un établissement sidérurgique avant la révolution industrielle: La forge du Port-Brillet (Mayenne)", Le Mouvement Social (in French), 58 (58), Published by: Editions l'Atelier on behalf of Association Le Mouvement Social: 63–94, doi:10.2307/3777237, JSTOR 3777237
