= Vatimont =

- Commune
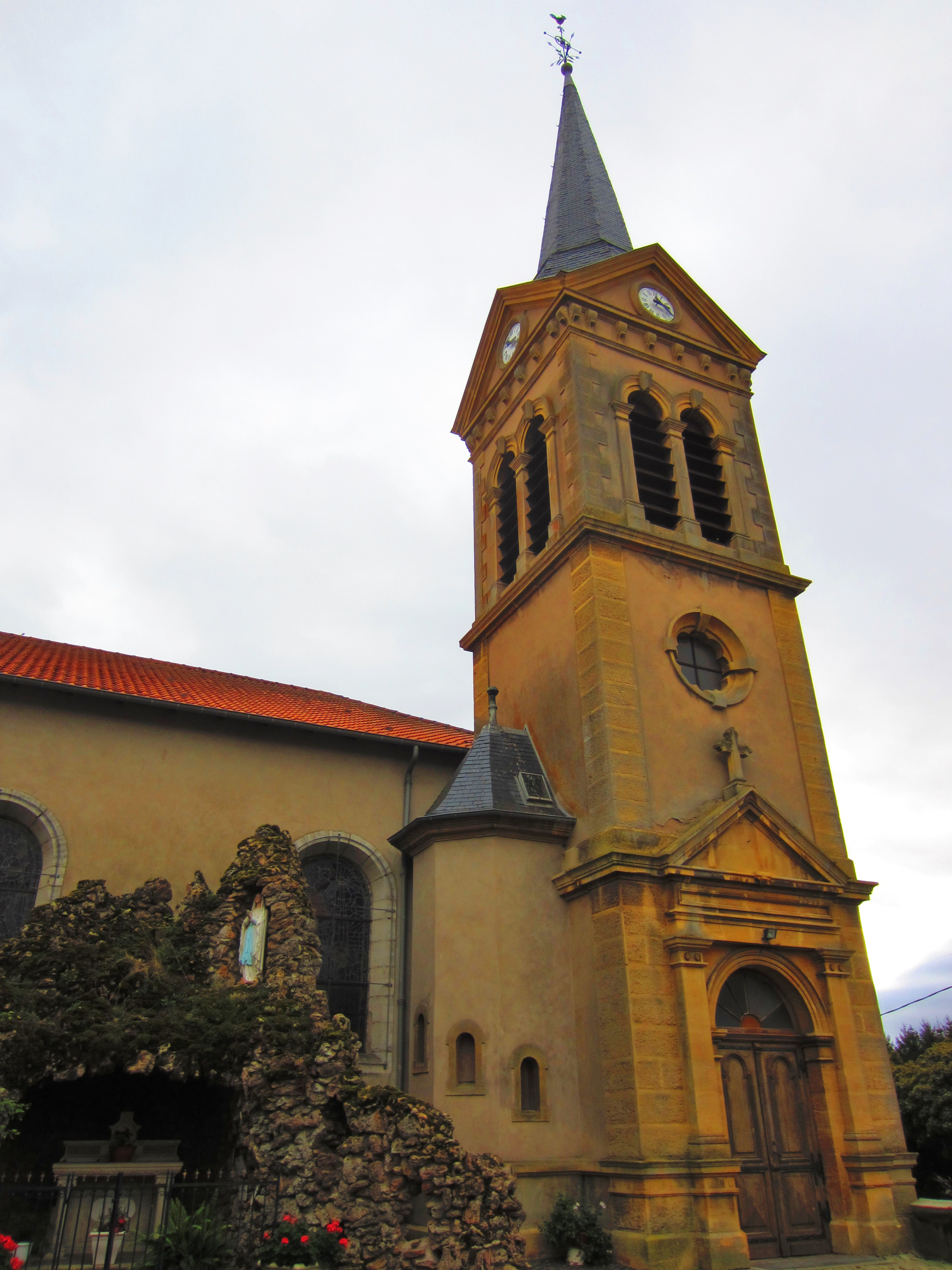
- The church in Vatimont

- Coat of arms
- Location of Vatimont
- Location within France Location within Grand Est
- Coordinates: 48°58′50″N 6°28′02″E
- Country: France
- Region: Grand Est
- Department: Moselle
- Arrondissement: Forbach-Boulay-Moselle
- Canton: Faulquemont
- Intercommunality: CC District urbain de Faulquemont

Government
  - Mayor (2020–2026): Philippe Belvoix
- Area^{1}: 8.13 km^{2} (3.14 sq mi)
- Elevation: 298 m (978 ft)
- Highest elevation: 303 m (994 ft)
- Lowest elevation: 224 m (735 ft)
- Population (2023): 306
  - Density: 37.6/km^{2} (97.5/sq mi)
- Time zone: UTC+01:00 (CET)
  - Summer (DST): UTC+02:00 (CEST)
- INSEE/Postal code: 57698 /57580
- ^{1} French Land Register data, which excludes lakes, ponds, glaciers > 1 km^{2} (0.386 sq mi or 247 acres) and river estuaries.

Vatimont (French pronunciation: [vatimɔ̃]; German: Wallersberg) is a commune in the Moselle department in Grand Est in north-eastern France.

== See also ==
- Communes of the Moselle department
