= Longwy =

- Commune
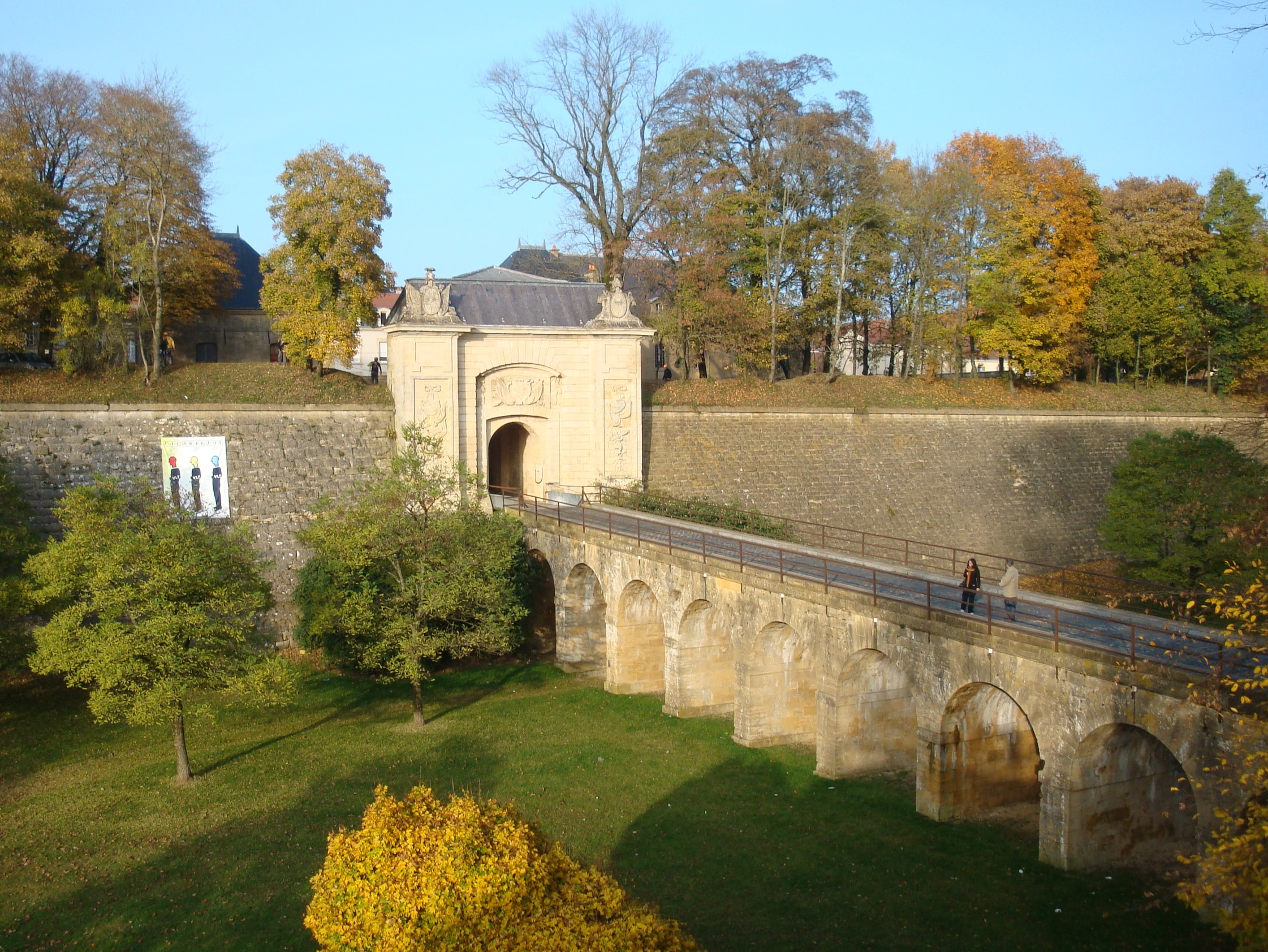
- Porte de France

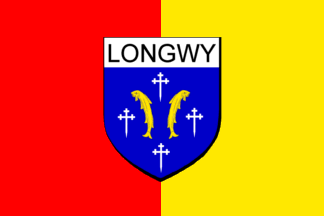
- Flag Coat of arms
- Location of Longwy
- Location within France Location within Grand Est
- Coordinates: 49°31′12″N 5°45′38″E
- Country: France
- Region: Grand Est
- Department: Meurthe-et-Moselle
- Arrondissement: Val-de-Briey
- Canton: Longwy
- Intercommunality: Grand Longwy Agglomération

Government
  - Mayor (2024–2026): Vincent Hamen
- Area^{1}: 5.34 km^{2} (2.06 sq mi)
- Elevation: 254 m (833 ft)
- Highest elevation: 396 m (1,299 ft)
- Lowest elevation: 250 m (820 ft)
- Population (2023): 15,679
  - Density: 2,940/km^{2} (7,600/sq mi)
- Time zone: UTC+01:00 (CET)
  - Summer (DST): UTC+02:00 (CEST)
- INSEE/Postal code: 54323 /54400
- Website: mairie-longwy.fr
- ^{1} French Land Register data, which excludes lakes, ponds, glaciers > 1 km^{2} (0.386 sq mi or 247 acres) and river estuaries.

Longwy (French pronunciation: [lɔ̃wi]; older German: Langich, [ˈlaŋɪç]; Luxembourgish: Lonkech) is a commune in the French department of Meurthe-et-Moselle, Lorraine, administrative region of Grand Est, northeastern France.

The inhabitants are known as Longoviciens.

In 2008, the ville neuve ("New Town") was listed as a UNESCO World Heritage Site, as part of the "Fortifications of Vauban" group for its contributions to the development of military architecture and engineering.

== Economy ==
Longwy has historically been an industrial center of the Lorraine iron mining district. Factories lined the river in historic postcards.

The town is also known for its artistic faience, produced there since 1798. It is produced today by the Société des faïenceries de Longwy et Senelle, often in cooperation with artists and ceramists. Overglaze enamel decoration, known as émaux and often in a manner similar to cloisonné, has been produced in Longwy ceramics since 1872. Initially produced under the direction of Amadeo de Carenza, this style reached a peak in the Art Deco style, retailed by the Parisian department store Printemps.

== Transport ==
Route nationale 52 (part of European route E411) passes through Longwy. Longwy station has rail connections to Luxembourg, Charleville-Mézières and Nancy.

== History ==
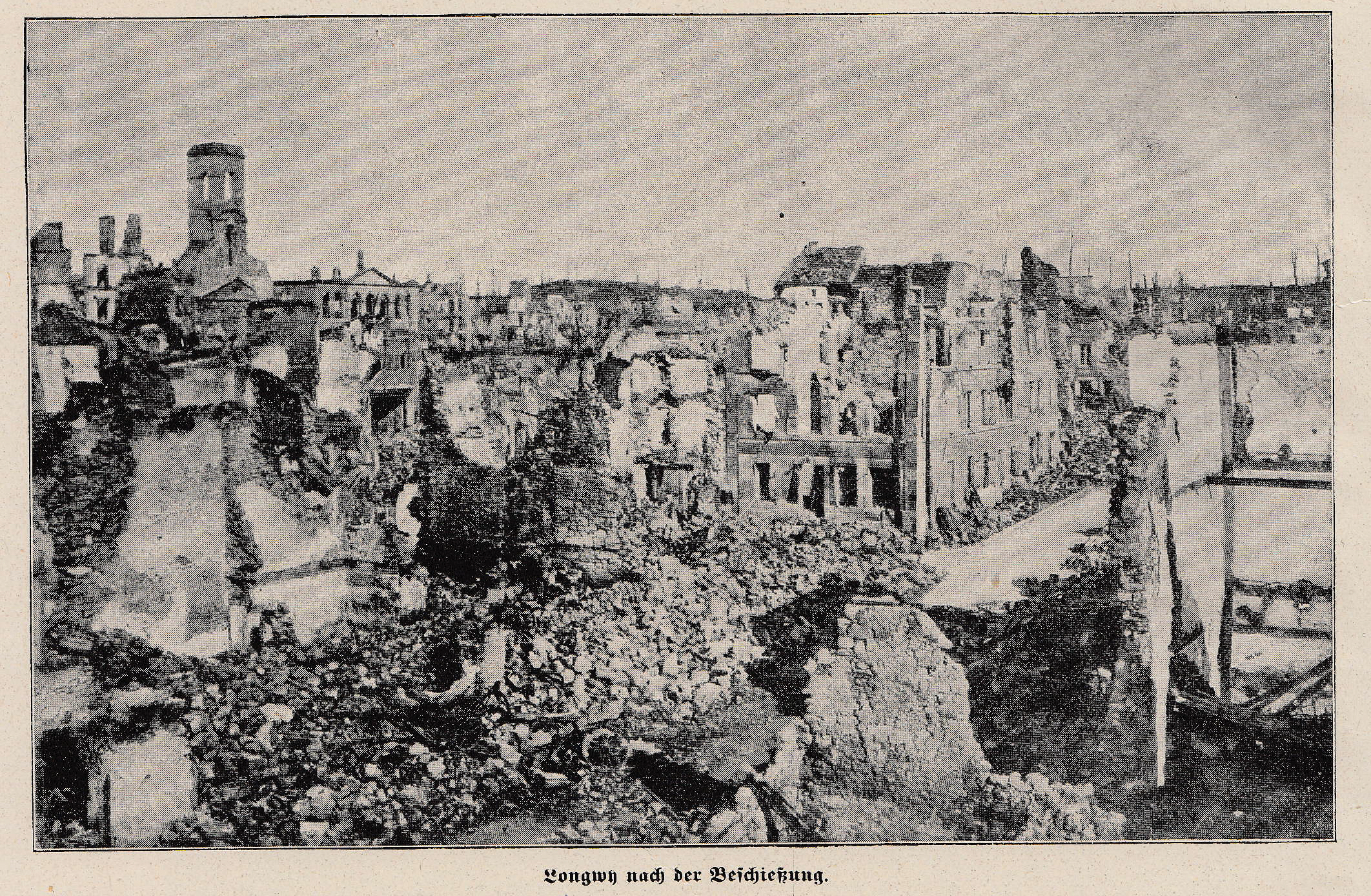
Destruction of Longwy France 1914

Longwy initially belonged to Lotharingia. After the division of that kingdom, the town became part of Upper Lorraine and ultimately the Duchy of Bar. Longwy was ceded to Wenceslaus I of Luxembourg in 1368, but was returned to Bar in 1378. The Duchy of Bar was then annexed into the Duchy of Lorraine in 1480.

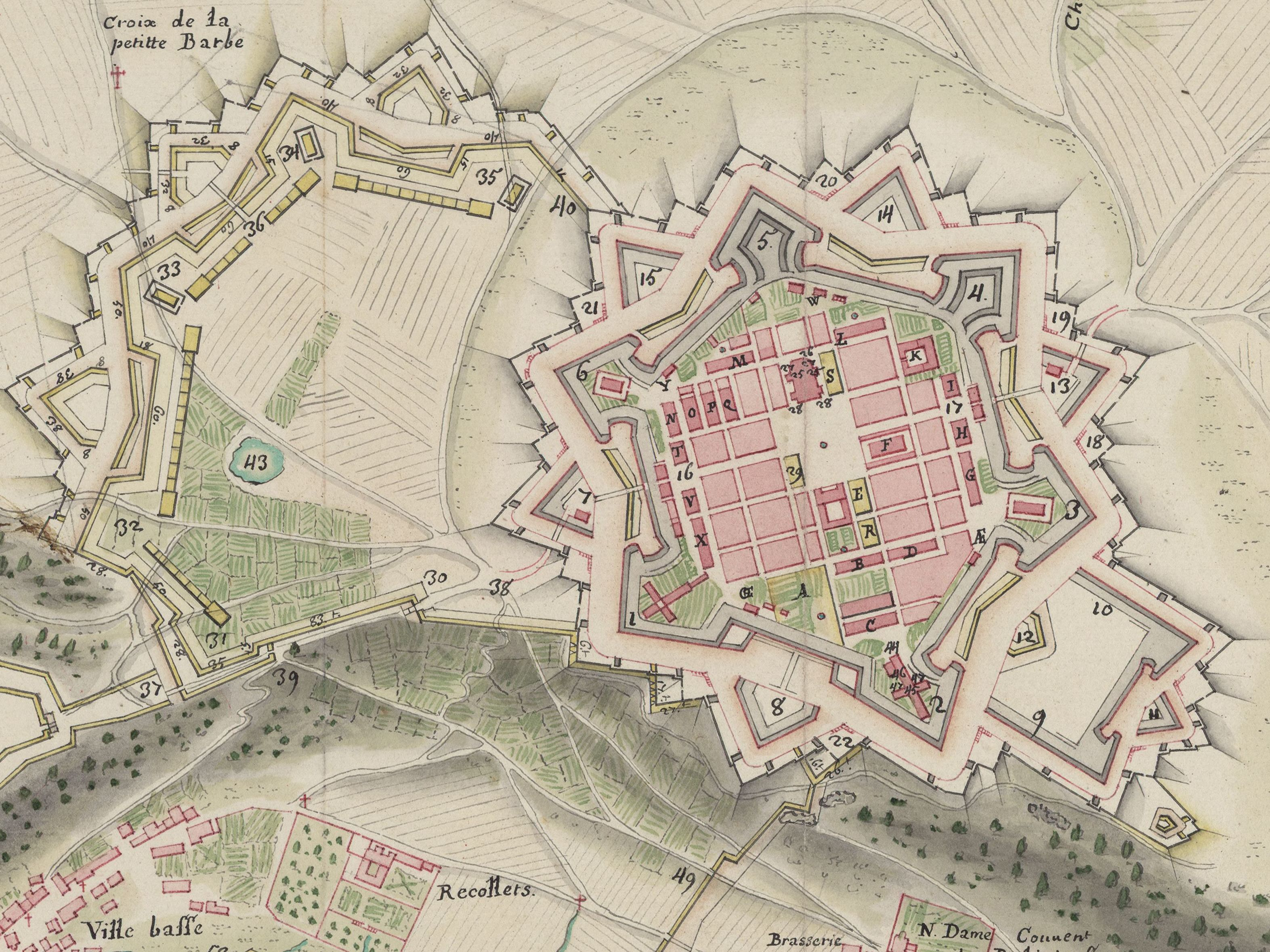
Plan of Longwy, 1698.

From 1648 to 1660 Longwy was part of the Kingdom of France, returning to the Duchy of Lorraine afterwards. It was made part of France again in 1670, a situation which was finalized in the Treaties of Nijmegen in 1678. Vauban fortified the town during the reign of Louis XIV, having demolished the medieval Château de Longwy, of which one tower remains.

After the French defeat in the Franco-Prussian War of 1870–71, almost all of the Moselle department, along with Alsace and portions of the Meurthe and Vosges departments, was ceded to the German Empire by the Treaty of Frankfurt on the ground that the population in those areas spoke German dialects. Only one fifth of Moselle, including Longwy, was spared annexation. Otto von Bismarck later bitterly regretted his decision when it was discovered that the region of Briey and Longwy was rich with iron ore, exploited by the Aciéries de Longwy among other members of the cartel Comptoir Métallurgique de Longwy.

After the Battle of the Ardennes in August 1914, Longwy was occupied by the Imperial German army until the 1918 Armistice. At the start of the war the fort at Longwy was commanded by Lieutenant Colonel Natalis Constant Darche. With a force of 3,500 men he was able to hold up the German 5th Army for three weeks.

== Population ==
Historical population
Year	Pop.	±% p.a.
1968	21,076	—
1975	20,131	−0.65%
1982	17,338	−2.11%
1990	15,439	−1.44%
1999	14,521	−0.68%
2007	14,346	−0.15%
2012	14,195	−0.21%
2017	14,378	+0.26%
2023	15,679	+1.45%
Source: INSEE

== People ==
- Count Claude Florimond de Mercy (1666–1734), Holy Roman Empire Field Marshal
- François Dominique Séraphin (1747–1800), French puppeteer
- Jean-Baptiste Fresez (1800–1867), Luxembourgish painter
- Paul Delisse (1817–1888), French trombonist
- Geneviève de Fontenay (1932–2023), French businesswoman
