= Auteuil, Oise =

Auteuil
- Commune
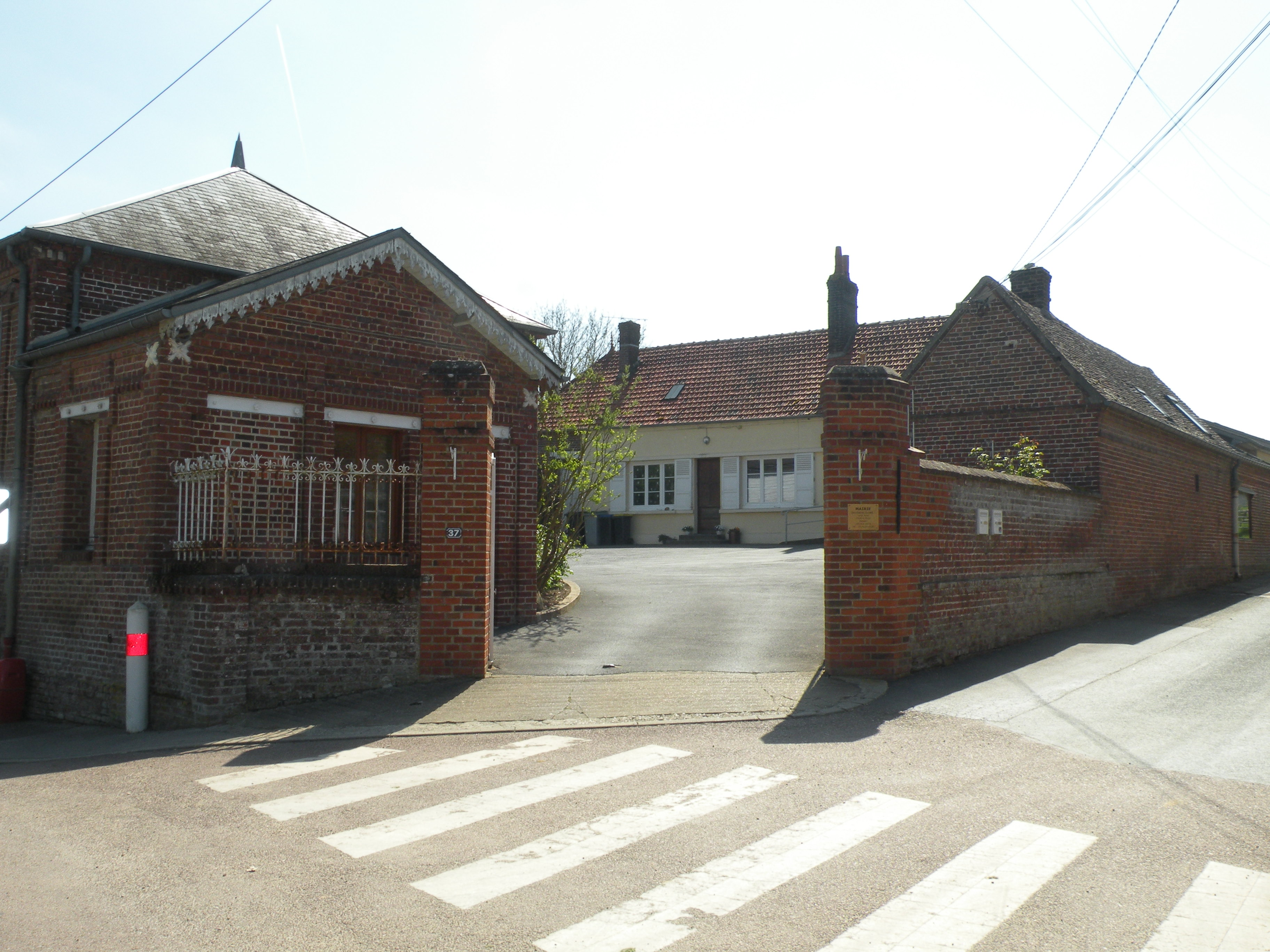
- The town hall in Auteuil

- Coat of arms
- Location of Auteuil
- Location within France Location within Hauts-de-France
- Coordinates: 49°20′32″N 2°05′16″E
- Country: France
- Region: Hauts-de-France
- Department: Oise
- Arrondissement: Beauvais
- Canton: Beauvais-2
- Intercommunality: CA Beauvaisis

Government
  - Mayor (2020–2026): Martine Delaplace
- Area^{1}: 11.92 km^{2} (4.60 sq mi)
- Elevation: 140 m (460 ft)
- Highest elevation: 231 m (758 ft)
- Lowest elevation: 87 m (285 ft)
- Population (2023): 554
  - Density: 46.5/km^{2} (120/sq mi)
- Time zone: UTC+01:00 (CET)
  - Summer (DST): UTC+02:00 (CEST)
- INSEE/Postal code: 60030 /60390
- ^{1} French Land Register data, which excludes lakes, ponds, glaciers > 1 km^{2} (0.386 sq mi or 247 acres) and river estuaries.

Auteuil (French pronunciation: [otœj]) is a commune in the Oise department in northern France.

== Population ==
Historical population
Year	Pop.	±% p.a.
1968	275	—
1975	295	+1.01%
1982	315	+0.94%
1990	453	+4.65%
1999	535	+1.87%
2007	581	+1.04%
2012	572	−0.31%
2017	554	−0.64%
2023	554	+0.00%
Source: INSEE

== See also ==
- Communes of the Oise department
