= Natalis Constant Darche =

French army officer (1856–1947)

- Born: 25 October 1856; Sainte-Aulde, Seine-et-Marne, France
- Died: 1947 (aged 90–91); Meaux, Seine-et-Marne, France
- Military career
- Allegiance: France
- Branch: French Army
- Service years: 1877–unknown
- Rank: Lieutenant colonel
- Conflicts: First World War
- Awards: Commander of the Legion of Honour

Lieutenant Colonel Natalis Constant Darche (25 October 1856 – 1947) was a French army officer. The son of General Gregoire Darche, he served in the ranks for five years before becoming an officer cadet. Darche's early career was unremarkable; he saw no active service and progressed to the rank of lieutenant colonel by 1911. In 1912 he was appointed to command the border post at Longwy, an antiquated fortress. He established improvised outer defensive works towards the German border. Darche's command, some 3,500 men, defended the fort in the opening stages of the First World War. Despite being surrounded and with no hope of relief Darche held out for three weeks, delaying the advance of Crown Prince Wilhelm's 5th Army.

Darche was appointed an officer of the Legion of Honour for his actions. He was imprisoned in Germany, though he was transferred to neutral Switzerland when he fell ill and was afterwards repatriated to France. Darche was later appointed a commander of the Legion of Honour before he retired to Meaux. A square and technical college in Longwy are named in his honour.

== Early life and career ==
Natalis Constant Darche was born at Sainte-Aulde in Seine-et-Marne, France, on 25 October 1856. He was the son of French General Gregoire Darche and his wife Chéron Constance Alexandrine Darche. Natalis Constant Darche joined the 45th Infantry Regiment of the French Army as a soldier, 2nd class, on 10 December 1877. He was promoted to corporal on 26 August 1878 and to quartermaster sergeant on 8 October 1879. He reverted to the rank of sergeant on 21 January 1880, but was promoted to quartermaster sergeant again on 21 April 1880 and to sergeant-major on 7 May 1881.

Darche attended the École militaire d'Infanterie as an officer cadet from 1 April 1883. He was commissioned as a second lieutenant in the 130th Infantry Regiment on 10 March 1884. Darche was promoted to lieutenant on 26 December 1887 and to captain, in the 51st Infantry Regiment on 10 July 1894. Darche was appointed a chevalier of the Legion of Honour on 17 September 1901. He transferred to the 42nd Infantry Regiment as chef de bataillon (equivalent to major) on 24 June 1905 and in the same rank to the 3rd Infantry Regiment on 23 June 1907. Darche was promoted to lieutenant colonel in the 162nd Infantry Regiment on 25 December 1911 and transferred to the 164th Infantry Regiment on 8 July 1913. Darche saw no active service during his early career.

== Battle of Longwy ==
Map of the Battle of the Frontiers showing the movements of the opposing armies and the position of Longwy on the frontier

A fanciful German depiction of the capture of Longwy

Darche was appointed to command the fort at Longwy, near the border with Belgium and Luxembourg in 1912. The fort was one of the 18th-century Vauban fortifications and was long since obsolete. Anticipating a conflict with Germany, Darche installed new forward posts as close to the border as possible and established his first defensive line some 1,200 metres (1,300 yd) in advance of the fort. He also constructed outworks at Coulmy, Bel Arbre, Tilleul and Vieux Chateau. These were earthwork redoubts, open to the rear, and supplemented by a ditch and barbed wire. Located some 350–550 metres (380–600 yd) outside the fort walls they had no structures to shelter their garrison and were not expected to last long against a determined attack.

The First World War began in the Balkans on 28 July 1914. At this point Darche commanded around 3,500 men at Longwy including the 4th battalion and 5th territorial battalion of the 164th Infantry Regiment, a half-company of engineers, a company of customs officers and 5 battery and part of 25 battery of the 5th Foot Artillery Regiment. On 31 July Darche ordered three companies of the 164th Regiment to man his outworks and sent scouts out towards the border. The same evening he was ordered to remove part of his garrison to guard the Othain river in front of Marville, Meuse, and the Chiers river at Longuyon. Darche was placed under the command of the 2nd Army Corps under General Augustin Gérard, though communications with that unit were not established until 4 August.

Germany declared war on France on 3 August and from that point German cavalry began crossing the frontier and slipping past the fort; some probing attacks were made on the outer defences. By 8 August Longwy had been entirely circled by a screen of German cavalry. On 9 August significant forces of infantry and cavalry were sighted at Morfontaine and attacked by Darche's artillery. On the following day the German general Gustav von Hollen, commanding two cavalry divisions within Crown Prince Wilhelm's 5th Army, twice asked Darche to surrender and was twice refused.

After continued attacks, and surrounded with no hope of relief, Darche finally surrendered his command on 26 August. Darche's actions had held up the advance of the 5th Army for three weeks, preventing it from forming a link between the German advances in Lorraine and Belgium, to the German Emperor's displeasure. The loss of Longwy gave the Germans access to the Briey coalfield, their most valuable conquest in the first months of the war.

== Later life and legacy ==
Darche had been appointed an officer of the Legion of Honour on the day before his surrender and was notified of this appointment by the Crown Prince. Darche was held as a prisoner of war in Germany. He was at Ingolstadt, Bavaria, in 1915 before being transferred to Marienburg, West Prussia. Darche fell ill and was evacuated to a hospital in neutral Switzerland on 18 June 1917. He was returned to France on 19 January 1918. Darche was appointed a commander of the Legion of Honour on 9 July 1920, by which time he was lieutenant colonel of the 35th Infantry Regiment. He retired to Meaux, Seine-et-Marne, where he died and was buried in 1947. A technical college, the Lycée Professionnel Darche, and a square, the Place du Colonel Darche, in Longwy are named in his honour.
