= Auguste Choisy =

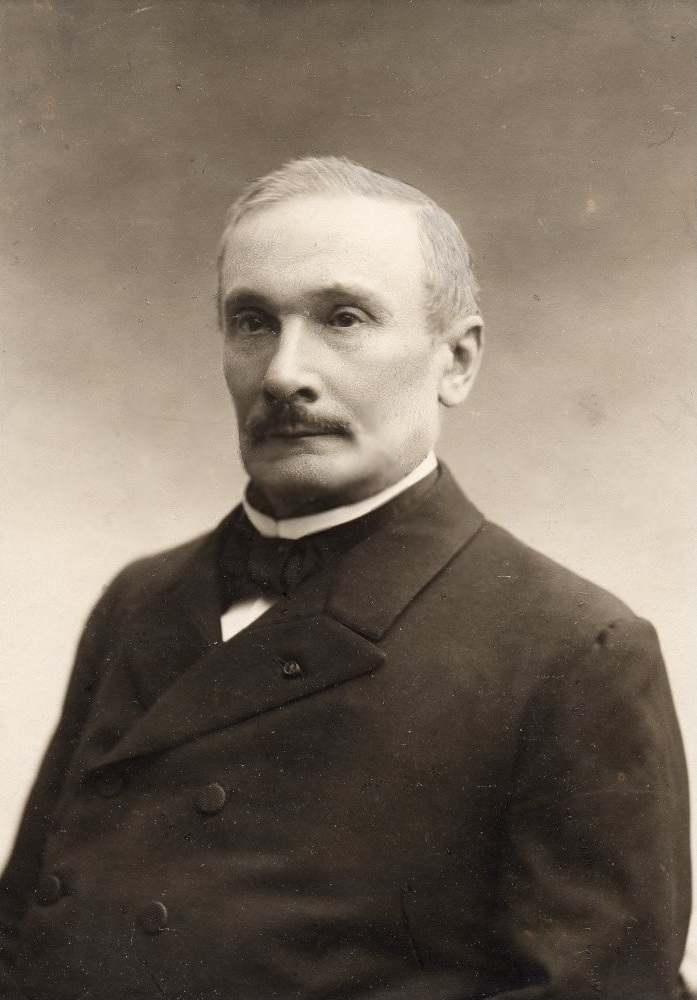
Portrait of Auguste Choisy

Auguste Choisy (7 February 1841 – 18 September 1909) was a French architectural historian and author of Histoire de l'Architecture.

== Biography ==
Choisy was born in Vitry-le-François. He studied architecture in Paris at the École Polytechnique the École des Ponts et Chaussées from 1861 to 1863. As part of his studies, he traveled to Rome and Athens where his interest was in the structures of ancient monuments rather than their decorative detail. He was professor of architecture at the École Nationale des Ponts et Chaussées from 1877 to 1901.

In 1899, he published his two-volume book, Histoire de l'architecture. In it, he developed isometric drawings that combined plan, elevation, section, perspective into a single drawing. He then used this visual approach to describe buildings in social and material terms along with historical determinism.

In 1904, he won the RIBA's Royal Gold Medal. Very important for the study of Greek architecture was his contribution "Le pictoresque et l'art grec" (chapter in The history of architecture).

Choisy died on September 18, 1909, at age 68, in Paris.

== Books by Auguste Choisy ==
- L'art de bâtir chez les romains 1873
- L'Asie Mineure et les Turcs en 1875: Souvenirs de Voyage par Auguste Choisy 1876
- L'art de bâtir chez les byzantins 1883
- Etudes épigraphiques sur l'architecture grecque 1883
- Histoire de l'Architecture (The history of architecture) 1899 (two volumes)
- L'Art de bâtir chez les Égyptiens 1904
- Vitruve 1909
