= Alphonse Péron =

French soldier and amateur naturalist

- Born: Pierre-Alphonse Péron; 29 November 1834; Saint-Fargeau, Yonne, France
- Died: 2 April 1908 (aged 73); Auxerre, Yonne, France
- Occupations: Soldier, naturalist

Alphonse Péron (29 November 1834 – 2 April 1908) was a French soldier and amateur naturalist. He used his spare time to pursue his interest in paleontology, and authored or coauthored several important works on the geology and paleontology of France and Algeria.

== Life ==
Pierre-Alphonse Péron was born on 29 November 1834 in Saint-Fargeau, Yonne. He attended the Collège d’Auxerre for his secondary education, then in 1853 entered the École spéciale militaire de Saint-Cyr. After graduating in 1855 he was posted to a series of different garrisons. He was assigned to Corsica in 1860, and later transferred to Algeria. In both places he was able to pursue his growing interest in geology, which absorbed much of his spare time for the rest of his life. In 1867 he was promoted to captain.

During the Franco-Prussian War Péron was seriously wounded at the Battle of Sedan in September 1870. After recovering he was posted to Montauban, Tarn-et-Garonne, from 1871 to 1875. He was promoted to sub-intendant in 1875 and moved in turn to Reims (Marne), Toul (Meurthe-et-Moselle), Joigny (Yonne), Troyes (Aube) and then in 1883 to Bourges (Cher). He was sub-intendent from 1875 to 1890, then military intendent from 1890 to 1896. Alphonse Péron died on 2 April 1908 in Auxerre, Yonne, aged 73.

== Geology and paleontology ==
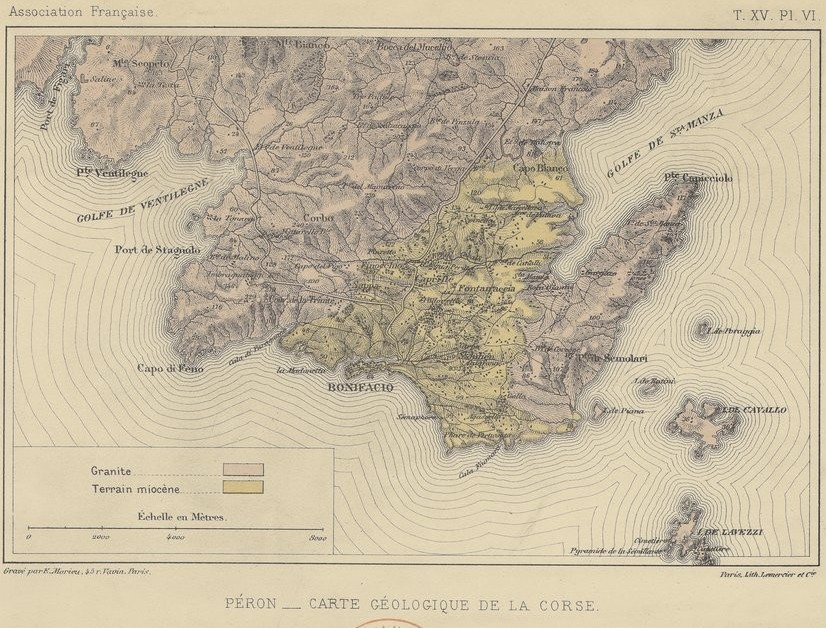
Geological map of Corsica by Péron (1886)

Péron's interest in geology and paleontology was kindled by fossils that he observed in Corsica in 1860. In Algeria he studied the geology around Aumale (Sour El-Ghozlane) and the Kabylie. In 1873 Péron contributed to the geological study of Tarn-et-Garonne. He went on to make observations of the Late Cretaceous formations of Southern France. Péron joined the first rank of gifted amateur geologists in France in the second half of the 19th century, others being Édouard de Verneuil, Gustave Cotteau, Antoine Passy, Gustave Dollfus and Auguste Viquesnel^{(de)}.

Péron collaborated with Victor-Auguste Gauthier in writing the Description des Echinides fossiles de l'Algérie under the direction of Gustave Cotteau. This was a significant work, of which the first two chapters were published in the Annales des Sciences géologiques (1873) and in the Bibliothèque des Hautes études (1875). They were subsequently revised in 1883–84 to form part of the first volume of this great work. From 1873 to 1891 Gauthier worked constantly on the descriptions of the Algerian fossil Echinidae for which Peron provided most of the materials, wrote the stratigraphic notes and collaborated with Gauthier on some of the descriptions. Cotteau retained overall responsibility and his opinion prevailed in questions of interpretations of genera and species and in general classification.

In 1852 the Mines department was charged with drawing a geological map of the three Algerian provinces. The map of Algiers Province by Ludovic Ville (Note: The polytechnician Ludovic-Gabriel-Alexandre-Raymond-Joseph Ville (1820-1877) spent most of his career in Algeria. In 1875 he was made Inspector General, a position created specially for him in light of his thirty years on service in Algeria. He travelled tirelessly in the provinces of Algiers and Oran and published his geological findings in a stream of papers.) was ready for the Exposition Universelle of 1867, as was the map of Oran Province, and Jules Tissot's map of Constantine Province was exhibited at Vienna in 1873. New versions of the maps were presented at the Exposition Universelle of 1878. The idea of a general geological map of Algeria was floated in 1881, when the Association française pour l'avancement des sciences met in Algiers. Péron's 202-page Essai d'une description géologique de l'Algérie (1883) was thus the culmination of thirty years of work.

In 1902 the Ministry of Education proposed that Georges Rolland should write up the results of the Tunisian Scientific Exploration Mission (1885–86), but he refused for health reasons. The task was given to Philippe Thomas, who was now in retirement. He wrote the Essai d'une description géologique de la Tunisie with the support of Jean Albert Gaudry, Alphonse Péron and Paul Bursaux, technical director of the Compagnie des phosphates de Gafsa. The first part, an Overview of physical geography, was published in 1907. The second part, Stratigraphy of the Palaeozoic and Mesozoic terrains, was published in 1908. Péron was President of the Société géologique de France (SGF) in 1905.

== Publications ==
Publications by Alphonse Péron included:

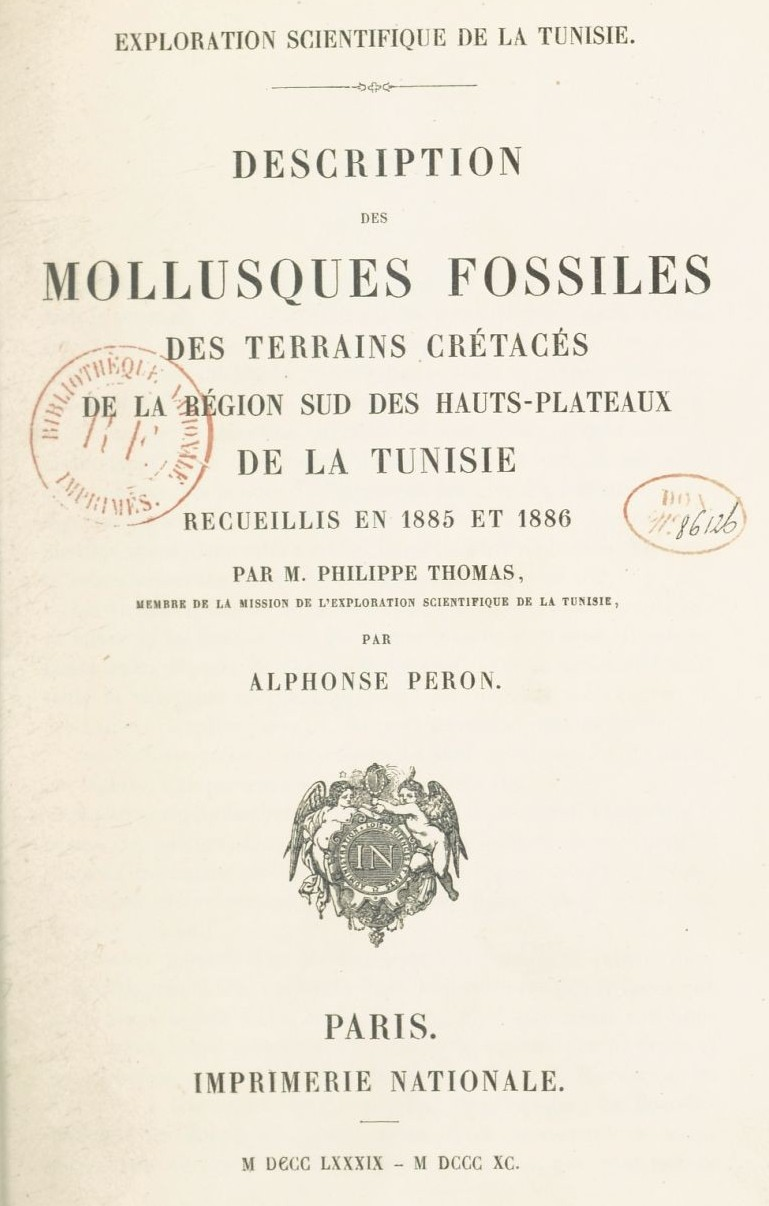

- Alphonse Péron (1866-06-04), "Notice sur la géologie des environs d'Aumale (Algérie)", Bulletin de la Société Géologique de France, XXIII, Paris: impr. de E. Martinet: 686–716
- Alphonse Péron; M. G. Cotteau (1869-02-15), "Sur les terrains jurassiques supérieurs en Algérie, avec Note sur les Échinidés du terrain jurassique supérieur d'Algérie", Bulletin de la Société Géologique de France, XXVI, Paris: impr. de E. Blot: paginé 517–533
- Alphonse Péron (1875), "Sur quelques points de la géologie du... Tarn-et-Garonne", Recueil de la Société des sciences, belles-lettres et arts de Tarn-et-Garonne, Montauban: impr. de Forestié neveu: 50
- Gustave Cotteau; Victor Gauthier; Alphonse Péron (1876–1884), Échinides fossiles de l'Algérie : description des espèces déjà recueillies dans ce pays et considérations sur leur position stratigraphique, Paris: G. Masson
- Alphonse Péron (1883), Essai d'une description géologique de l'Algérie, pour servir de guide aux géologues dans l'Afrique française, Paris: G. Masson, p. 202
- Alphonse Péron (1887), Description du terrain tertiaire du sud de l'île de Corse (Association française pour l'avancement des sciences. Congrès de Nancy. Séance du 13 août 1886), Nancy: impr. de Berger-Levrault, p. 25
- Alphonse Péron; Victor Gauthier; Jules Lambert (1887), Notes pour servir à l'histoire du terrain de Craie dans le Sud-Est du bassin anglo-parisien (Notes on the History of the Chalk Formations in the Southeast of the Anglo-Parisian Basin).
- Alphonse Péron (1889–1893), Exploration scientifique de la Tunisie. Description des invertébrés fossiles des terrains crétacés de la région sud des hauts plateaux de la Tunisie recueillis en 1885 et 1886 par M. Philippe Thomas, Paris: Impr. nationale, p. 405
- Alphonse Péron (1889–1890), Description des mollusques fossiles des terrains crétacés de la région sud des hauts-plateaux de la Tunisie recueillis en 1885 et 1886 par M. Philippe Thomas, Paris: Impr. nationale / exploration scientifique de la Tunisie, p. 327
- Philippe Thomas; Alphonse Péron (1891–1893), Exploration scientifique de la Tunisie. Illustrations de la partie paléontologique et géologique, Planches XII-XXXI, dessinées d'après nature par M. F. Gauthier, Paris: Imp. nationale
- Alphonse Péron (1895), Gustave Cotteau, notice biographique (Extrait du "Bulletin de la Société des sciences historiques et naturelles de l'Yonne", 1er semestre 1895), Auxerre: Impr. de "la Constitution, p. 46
- Alphonse Péron (1896–1897), Les Ammonites du crétacé supérieur de l'Algérie (The Ammonoidea of the Algerian Late Cretaceous), Paris: Société géologique de France
- Études paléontologiques sur les terrains du département de l'Yonne (Paleontological Studies of the Formations of the Yonne Department.)
  - Alphonse Péron (1900), "Céphalopodes et gastropodes de l'étage néocomien. (Cephalopoda and gastropoda of the Neocomian Stage)", Bulletin de la Société des sciences historiques et naturelles de l'Yonne", 2e semestre 1899, Auxerre: Impr. de "la Constitution: 153
  - Alphonse Péron (1901), Les Nérinéidées des terrains jurassiques (The Nerinea of the Jurassic Formations)
  - Alphonse Péron (1905), Les Pélécypodes rauraciens et séquaniens (The Rauracian^{(fr)} and Sequian^{(fr)} Pelecypoda)
- Alphonse Péron (1900), Préambule. Le Morvan et ses enveloppes : Terrains de la vallée de l'Yonne, Paris, p. 40
- Alphonse Péron (1905), Les Gisements de phosphate de chaux du département de l'Yonne (Extrait des "Comptes rendus du Congrès des sociétés savantes"), Paris: Impr. nationale, p. 32
- Alphonse Péron; Aurélien Valette (1910), "L'Oolithe ferrugineuse du bajocien dans l'Yonne et autour du Morvan", Bulletin de la Société des sciences historiques et naturelles de l'Yonne, 2e semestre 1909, Auxerre: impr. de A. Gallot: 44

== Sources ==
- Alphonse Péron (1834-1908) (in French), BnF: Bibliotheque nationale de France
- Bonnichon, Philippe; Geny, Pierre; Nemo, Jean (2012-11-27), Présences françaises outre-mer (XVIe-XXIe siècles). Tome I - Histoire : périodes et continents (in French), KARTHALA Editions, ISBN 978-2-8111-0736-9
- Burollet, Pierre F. (21 June 1995), "L'exploration de la Tunisie avant la première guerre mondiale", Travaux du Comitée français d'Histoire de la Géologie (in French), 9 (3), Comité Français d'Histoire de la Géologie (COFRHIGEO) (séance du 21 juin 1995)
- Gaudant, J., Pierre-Alphonse PÉRON (in French), Société Géologique de France
- Gaudant, Jean (2008), Géologues et paléontologues: de la passion à la profession (in French), Presses des MINES, ISBN 978-2-35671-008-6
- Lambert, J. (6 June 1911), "Victor-Auguste Gauthier 1837–1911 Notice nécrologique", Bulletin, vol. 11, Société Géologique de France
- "Ludovic-Gabriel-Alexandre-Raymond-Joseph VILLE (1820-1877)", Annales des mines (in French)
