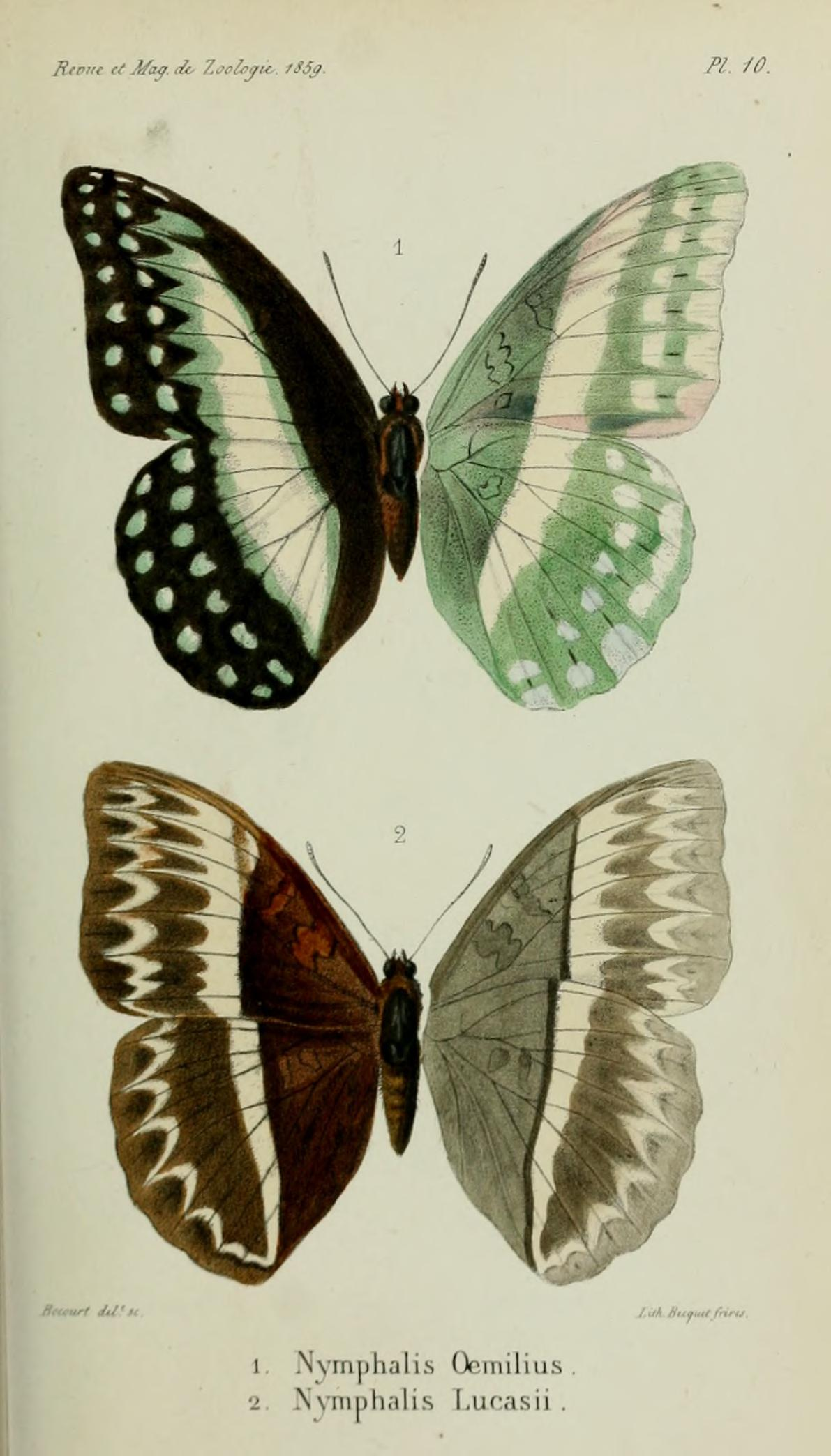
- Cymothoe lucasii and Cymothoe oemilius

Scientific classification
- Kingdom: Animalia
- Phylum: Arthropoda
- Class: Insecta
- Order: Lepidoptera
- Family: Nymphalidae
- Genus: Cymothoe
- Species: C. lucasii

Binomial name
- Cymothoe lucasii (Doumet, 1859)

Synonyms
- Nymphalis lucasii Doumet, 1859; Cymothoe cloetensi Seeldrayers, 1896

= Cymothoe lucasii =

Fiery yellow glider

Species of butterfly

Cymothoe lucasii, the fiery yellow glider, is a butterfly in the family Nymphalidae. It is found in Nigeria, Cameroon, Equatorial Guinea, Gabon, the Republic of the Congo, the Central African Republic and the Democratic Republic of the Congo. The habitat consists of forests.

The larvae feed on Rinorea species.

== Subspecies ==
- Cymothoe lucasii lucasii (Equatorial Guinea, Gabon, western Democratic Republic of the Congo)
- Cymothoe lucasii binotorum Darge, 1985 (Nigeria, Cameroon, Congo, Central African Republic)
- Cymothoe lucasii cloetensi Seeldrayers, 1896 (Democratic Republic of the Congo: Uele, Ituri, Kwngo, Sankuru)
- Cymothoe lucasii minigorum Darge, 1985 (Congo: Brazzaville district)
