= Echinopedinidae =

Echinopedinidae Temporal range: Eocene

Scientific classification
- Kingdom: Animalia
- Phylum: Echinodermata
- Family: Echinopedinidae
- Genus: Echinopedina; Cotteau, 1866

Species
- E. gacheti; Desmoulins, 1837 Middle Eocene.: E. biarritzensis; Cotteau, 1893 Late Eocene.: E. granulosa; Lambert, 1902 Eocene: E. libyca; de Loriol, 1881 Eocene.

Extinct family of marine invertebrates

Echinopedinidae is a family of echinoderms.
