= Jacques de Morgan =

French engineer, geologist and archaeologist (1857–1924)

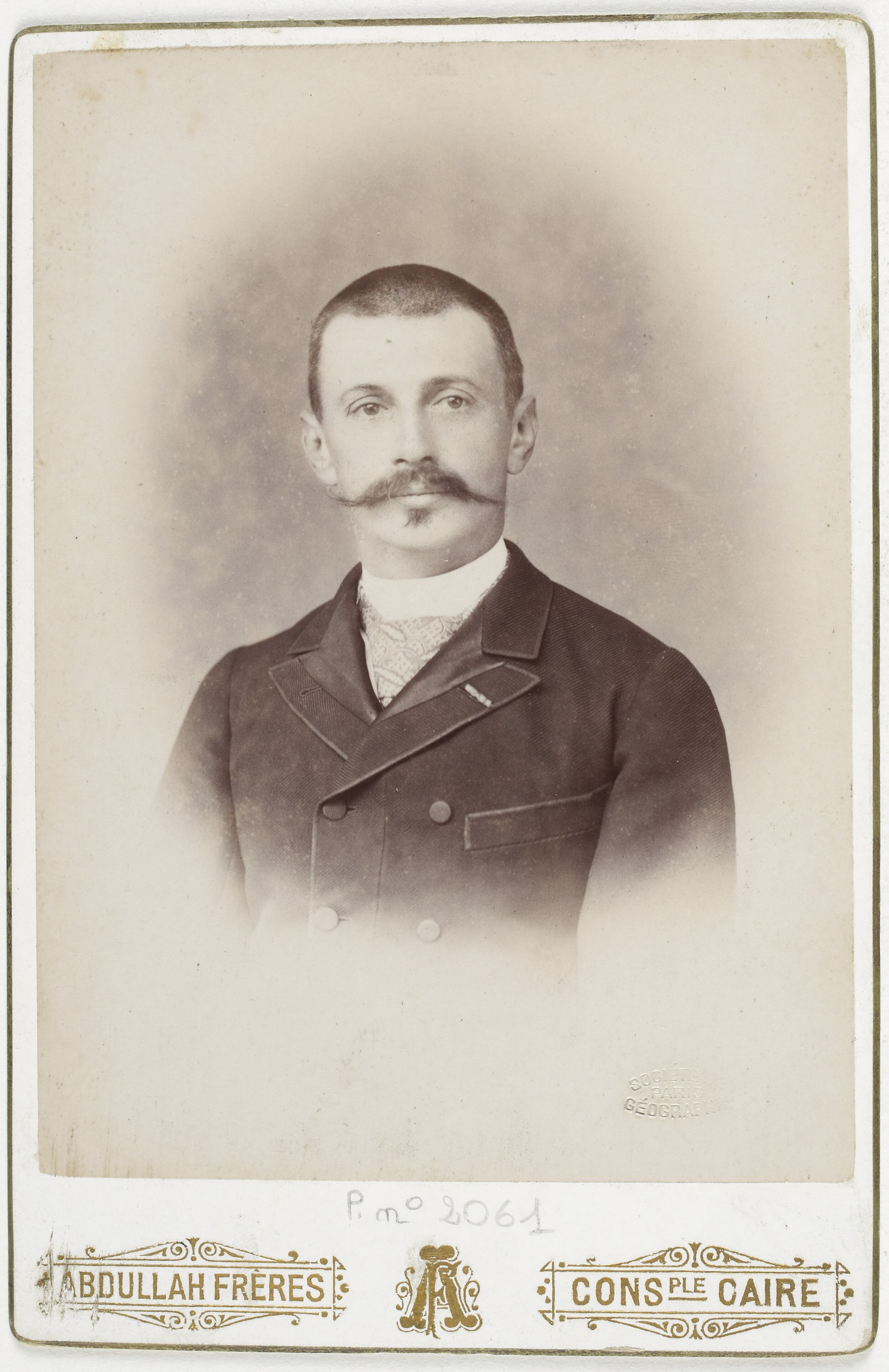
Jacques Jean Marie de Morgan (1892)

Jean-Jacques de Morgan (3 June 1857 – 14 June 1924) was a French mining engineer, geologist, and archaeologist. He was the Director of Antiquities for the government of Egypt from 1892 to 1897, and excavated in Memphis and Dahshur, providing many drawings of many Egyptian pyramids. De Morgan also worked at Stonehenge, Persepolis, and many other sites.

In Russian Armenia, de Morgan was the manager of a copper mine at Akhtala. "The Caucasus is of special interest in the study of the origins of metals; it is the easternmost point from which prehistoric remains are known; older than Europe and Greece, it still retains the traces of those civilizations that were the cradle of our own."

In 1887–89 he unearthed 576 graves around Alaverdi and Akhatala, near the Tiflis-Alexandropol railway line.

== Early life ==
De Morgan was born in Huisseau-sur-Cosson, Loir-et-Cher. His father Eugène, also called "Baron" de Morgan, was an engineer in mineral findings. Eugène pursued interests were in entomology and prehistory. He had two sons, Henry and Jacques who became interested in doing fieldwork, excavating the Campigny faults near Rouen with him, which had lent its name to the first phase of the European Neolithic. Through his father, Jacques became acquainted with Gabriel de Mortillet, who was connected with the museum of national antiquities in Saint-Germain during investigations of Merovingian cemeteries, and who showed him how to catalogue excavated objects. De Morgan's goal was to be a professional geologist like his father, and his personal lifestyle had given him a way to travel and study since his early youth. In 1879 he started to publish the results of his research, illustrated with drawings that were notable for their finesse and documentary precision.

== Malaya ==
As a young man, de Morgan travelled to Perak, then a new British protectorate in Malaya. In 1884, where he was commissioned by Hugh Low, the Resident of Perak, to produce the first geological and mining map of the district of Kinta in exchange for a tin concession at Kliang Lallang near Gopeng. De Morgan studied the tin mines around Lahat, Papan, Pusing and Gopeng. A photogravure of the map, which also showed the topography and drainage system of the Kinta Valley, was enclosed in the Perak annual report of 1884.

While in Kinta, de Morgan was guided by a Mandailing prospector named Kulop Riau, using Orang Asli guides and porters. De Morgan stayed with the Orang Asli and made ethnological observations and drawings in his travel journal. De Morgan also met Raja Bilah, the headman of the Mandailing in Papan and the doyen of the Perak Mandailing. De Morgan observed Chinese, Mandailing and European mines in Papan, and remarked that the most important mine belonged to Raja Bilah.

== Tin mining in France ==
Upon his return to France, de Morgan formed a tin-mining company, but appears to have lost out on his financial interest when this was merged with the Société des Mines de'Etain de Pérak in 1886 to form the Société des Etains de Kinta, better known as SEK, which became the longest-running mine in Malaysia.

== Travels in Iran and places nearby ==
De Morgan travelled to Susiana as he attempted to retrace the routes of the Assyrian campaigns in Elam. He arrived in Susa, former capital of Elam, which had been explored six years previously by an expedition led by Marcel Dieulafoy. As he explored the ruins outside the small village of Shush, his curiosity was aroused by the high mound known as "the Citadel", at the foot of which he recovered some flints and old potsherds.

These finds led him to reopen excavations at the site. In Tehran he confided his plans to the French minister, René de Balloy, who was eager to obtain a monopoly for France of archaeological research in Persia. It took time, however, before these efforts, under de Morgan's guidance, were successful. In 1892 de Morgan noted that there were petroleum seepages in Iran which he believed could be commercially profitable. In the meantime he published his Mission scientifique en Perse, with four volumes of geological studies; two volumes of archaeological studies on tombs and other monuments that were still seen; one volume dedicated to Kurdish dialects and the languages of northern Persia; one volume of Mandaean texts; and two volumes of geographical studies.

The excavations at Susa were headed by Jacques de Morgan in 1897 and carried on by others until the outbreak of World War I. Among their many discoveries are eight perforated plaques, three of them whole or nearly whole, and the rest fragmentary.

The most important find, however, was the famous Victory Stele of Naram-Sin, brought to Susa as war booty by the Elamite king Shutruk-Nahhunte.

== Work in Egypt and fictional depictions ==
Broad collar of Sathathormeryt, found on her mummy discovered by Jacques de Morgan at Dashur between 1894-1895

De Morgan was the director of antiquities in Egypt from 1892 to 1897, and excavated in Memphis and Dahshur, providing many drawings of many Egyptian pyramids. He features as a prominent character in The Mummy Case, the third book in the Amelia Peabody historical mystery series (written by Egyptologist Barbara Mertz under her pen name, Elizabeth Peters) set against the background of late Victorian to early twentieth century Egyptian archaeology; de Morgan is also referenced in books four and five in the series.

== Bibliography ==
- Idem, "Exploration dans la presqu'île malaise. Moeurs, coutumes et langages des Negritos Sakayes et Seumangs,"
- L'humanité préhistorique: esquisse de préhistoire générale
- “Note sur les gîtes de naphte de Kend-e Chirin,” Annales des mines, February 1892, pp. 1–16
- Morgan, Jacques de (1895–1904), Mission scientifique en Perse, vol. 3 parts II–IV, Etudes géologiques. Paléontologie, Part II. Echinides fossiles by Gustave Cotteau and Victor Gauthier; Part III. Echinides fossiles (supplément) by Victor Gauthier; Part IV. Mollusques fossiles by H. Douvillé, Paris: E. Leroux
- Mission scientifique au Caucase (2 vols., 1889)
- Mission scientifique en Perse (5 tomes, 1894–1904)
- Histoire et travaux de la délégation en Perse, 1897-1905 (1905)
- Manuel de numismatique Orientale de l’antiquité et du moyen-âge (1923–36)
