= Paul Anthelme Bourde =

French writer and colonial administrator (1851–1914)

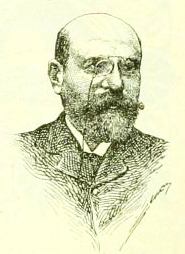
- Born: 23 May 1851; Voissant, Isère, France
- Died: 27 October 1914 (aged 63); Paris, France
- Occupations: Journalist, author, colonial administrator
- Known for: Tunisian olive industry

Paul Anthelme Bourde (23 May 1851 – 27 October 1914) was a French journalist, author and colonial administrator. Self-taught, he became a respected contributor to Le Temps, writing on a broad range of subjects. He was hostile to the poets associated with the Decadent movement and positive about colonial enterprises. He did much to improve agriculture, particularly the cultivation of olives, in Tunisia.

== Early years ==
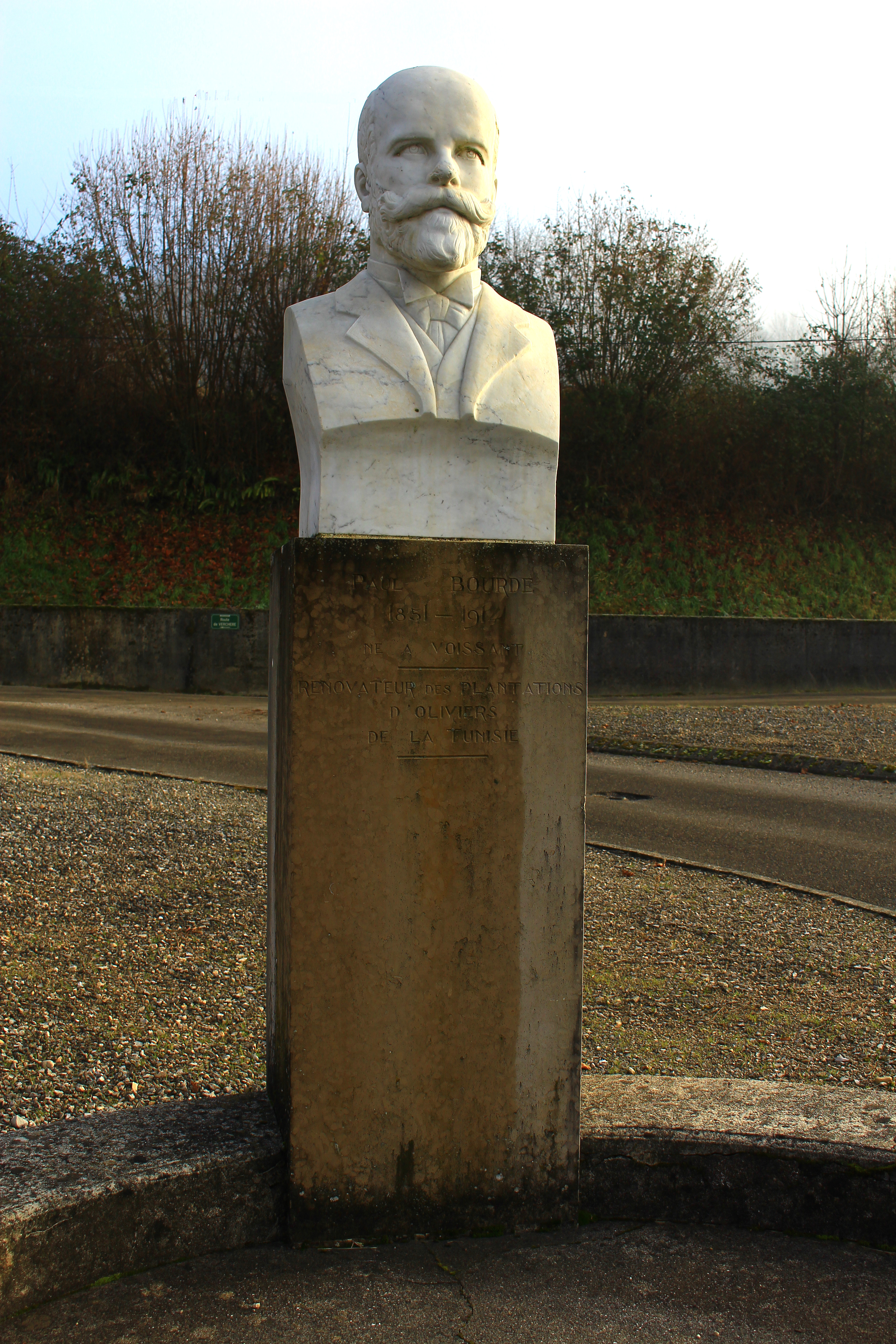
Sculpture of Paul Bourde in Voissant

Paul Anthelme Bourde was born at Voissant, Isère, on 23 May 1851. His father was a deputy sergeant in the Savoy customs. After Savoy was annexed by France in 1860, the family moved to northern France near the Belgian border, where Bourde studied at the local school in Harcy. He moved on to the Petit Séminaire of Charleville, where he was a classmate of Arthur Rimbaud and the future novelist Jules Mary. He was expelled from the séminaire in 1866 for having planned with his friends to escape and travel to Abyssinia to search for the sources of the Nile. Rimbaud took the plan seriously and began to learn the Amharic language. (Note: Rimbaud later wrote to Bourde looking for a recommendation as a correspondent to Le Temps on a planned trip to cover the war in Abyssinia. Bourde was then an established journalist for Le Temps, but despite Rimbaud's excellent qualifications, he did not support Rimbaud's application.)

For a while Bourde undertook farm work in the Bugey region, where his parents had retired. He then took a job in Lyon, where he met the poet Josephin Soulary, the curator of the library. Soulary helped him move to Paris, where despite being self-taught he wanted to become a journalist. At first he struggled to make a living. When the Franco-Prussian War (1870–71) was declared he had to join the National Guard to avoid starvation. Bourde's first publication, under the pseudonym of "Paul Delion", was a violent attack on the members of the Commune and the Central Committee published by Alphonse Lemerre in 1871. By chance he met the chemist Marcellin Berthelot, who helped him get work at the Parisian newspaper Le Temps. In 1879 Le Temps chose him to accompany a parliamentary mission to Algeria. His account of this trip established his reputation as a journalist and a colonial publicist.

In 1880 Bourde reported on the occupation of Tunisia, and then toured Europe. In 1885 he visited Bắc Ninh in Tonkin. Bourde traveled with the expedition of Francis Garnier in Tonkin as a reporter for Le Temps, and published De Paris au Tonkin in 1885. As the expedition passed through Port Said, Bourde sent a report describing it as a sleazy place where European prostitutes waited to fleece colonials who had made their fortunes in the east, rather than as a romantic oriental town. He was unimpressed by the Suez Canal, which he found monotonous despite the impressive statistics. He also asserted that the British preferred to travel by French ships to avoid the "barbaric cooking of their compatriots." Many of his articles from these journeys were published in Le Temps.

The 6 August 1885 issue of Le Temps carried a Bourde column, in which Stéphane Mallarmé and Paul Verlaine were labeled "decadent" poets. He said there was nothing new in their movement, which was simply an exaggerated form of Romanticism. The poet Ernest Raynaud said that Bourde was the first to use the appellation "décadent", meaning it as a slur, but the term was readily accepted by its targets, who became known as the decadent movement.

== Colonial administrator ==
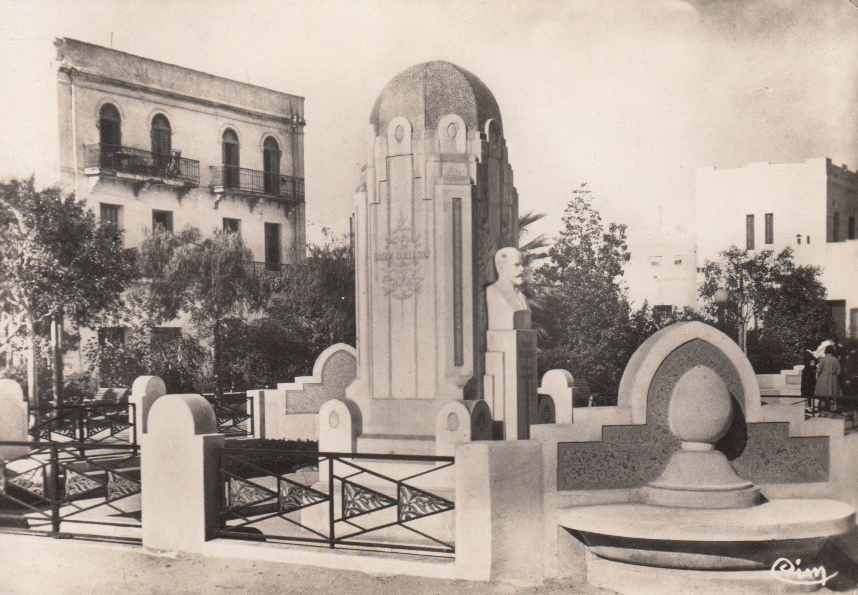
Sculpture of Paul Bourde in Sfax

In 1890, after another visit to Tunisia, Bourde launched a campaign accusing the French government of neglecting its duties in Tunisia, where the local people were living in misery. He said that French colonists could show them good farming methods and the route to prosperity, progress and happiness. The government responded by appointing him to an administrative position in Tunisia, and made him Director of Agriculture when he arrived in Tunis. He became an effective administrator of both colonization and agriculture.

Bourde learned from ancient accounts of the country and showed that fruit trees, particularly olives, could be grown in the semi-arid region south of Kairouan. He argued that central Tunisia had been a desert before the Roman invasion, and the Romans had introduced olive tree cultivation. In the 11th century the Arabs destroyed the trees in an attempt to convert the area to pasturage for a nomadic population, causing great damage. He found that, contrary to the opinions of archaeologists, milled stones found in many ruins were not steles commemorating local deities but were olive presses. Bourde revived agriculture in the neglected areas, by working with associations of European settlers and local people. He was a prolific author of reports on cultivation of cereals and fruit trees, sheep raising, locust invasions, cactus plantations and vineyards.

Due to his success in Tunisia, Bourde was appointed Secretary General of Madagascar in 1895. He traveled to Madagascar in January 1896, but soon fell out with that island's Resident General, Hippolyte Laroche, who accused Bourde of trying to usurp his position. He left when the island was converted from a protectorate to a colony in January 1897.

== Last years ==
Back in France in 1897, Bourde again became a regular contributor to Le Temps, and submitted articles for the remainder of his life. He was among the first to urge French intervention in Morocco, and regularly pushed for the methodical exploration of the Sahara. He continued to write on a range of philosophical and historical subjects, including the French Revolution. Paul Bourde died in Paris on 27 October 1914.

A monument to Bourde was created by the Belgian sculptor Yvonne Serruys. It was unveiled in Sfax, Tunisia, by Resident General François Manceron on 13 April 1930 in a ceremony attended by many notable people. Bourde's and that of the geologist Philippe Thomas were thrown down and shattered on the night of 3–4 January 1957. The mayor of Voissant, Bourde's birthplace, managed to recover it and erect it in the heart of Voissant, where it stood until 1981. It was then replaced by a copy. The village of Néyrieu near Saint-Benoît, Ain, where Paul Bourde is buried, asked for the original. A local stonemason restored the bust, and it was put in place in the village in 1994.

== Works ==
Bourde's publications included:

=== Miscellaneous works ===
- "Paul Delion" (pseudonym) (1871). Les membres de la Commune et le Comité Central. Alphonse Lemerre. p. 446.
- Russe et Turcs – La guerre d'Orient. Paris. 1878.
- A travers l'Algérie. Charpentier. 1880. pp. 389.
- Le Patriote. 1882. p. 250.
- La fin du vieux temps. Calmann Lévy. 1884. p. 374.
- De Paris au Tonkin. Calmann Lévy. 1885. pp. 383.
- En Corse: L'esprit de clan, etc. Calmann Lévy. 1887. p. 460.
- Les abus dans la Marine. Calmann Lévy. 1888. p. 290.
- En Tunisie. Collection of articles from Le Temps. n.d.
- La Tunisie devant les Chambres. Schiller. 1890.

=== Colonial reports ===
- Rapport à M. Rouvier, résident général, sur la culture de l'olivier dans le centre de la Tunisie, Imprimerie Rapide 1893 (87 p.)
- Rapport à M. Rouvier sur l'élevage du mouton en Tunisie, Imprimerie Rapide, 1893 (40 p.)
- Le Mal de l'Algérie, Imprimerie Pariset, 1894
- Projet d'enquête sur le cactus, Imprimerie Rapide, 1894
- Rapport à M. René Millet, résident général, sur la culture de l'olivier dans le nord de la Régence, Imprimerie Rapide, 1895
- La viticulture en Tunisie in la France en Tunisie, Ed. Carré et Naud, 1897
- Rapport sur les cultures fruitières et en particulier sur la culture de l'olivier dans le centre de la Tunisie, Imprimerie Rapide, 1899 (68 p.)

=== Plays ===
Bourde published three plays under the pseudonym Paul Anthelme:

- La fin du vieux temps, 3 acts, Théâtre Libre 1892
- Nos deux consciences, 3 acts, Illust. Théâtrale, 1902, Théâtre de la Porte Saint-Martin (Note: The comedian, singer and pantomime artist Félicia Mallet played the role of Jacquemart in Nos deux consciences.) (Note: Anthelme's nephew sold the rights to Nos deux consciences to screenwriter Louis Verneuil, who in turn sold it to Alfred Hitchcock. It was the basis for Hitchock's 1953 film I Confess.)
- L'Honneur japonais, 5 acts, Illust. Théâtrale, 1912, Théâtre de l'Odéon

== Sources ==
- Arnold, Jeremy (2014). "I Confess". Turner Classic Movies.
- "Félicia Mallet". Les Archives du Spectacle. 22 August 2008.
- Finch, Michael P.M. (15 August 2013). A Progressive Occupation?: The Gallieni-Lyautey Method and Colonial Pacification in Tonkin and Madagascar, 1885–1900. Oxford University Press. ISBN 978-0-19-967457-2.
- Hou, Shen (2008). A Magazine of Nature: "Garden and Forest" and the Rise of American Environmental Awareness. ISBN 978-0-549-64906-9.
- Huber, Valeska (1 August 2013). Channelling Mobilities: Migration and Globalisation in the Suez Canal Region and Beyond, 1869–1914. Cambridge University Press. ISBN 978-1-107-03060-2.
- Kazdaghli, Habib (September 2006), Rétrospective des politiques mémorielles en Tunisie à travers l'histoire des statues et des monuments (XIXe-XXe siècles) (PDF) (in French), Bucarest: Expériences et mémoire : partager en français la diversité du monde, archived from the original on 22 December 2015
- "La statue de Voissant". Sfax de 1881 à 1956.
- "La ville européenne et son évolution". Sfax de 1881 à 1956.
- Mortelette, Yann (2006). "Paul Bourde (1851–1914)". Le Parnasse. Presses Paris Sorbonne. ISBN 9782840504436.
- Speake, Jennifer, ed. (2003). Literature of Travel and Exploration: A to F. Taylor & Francis. ISBN 978-1-57958-425-2.
- Starkie, Enid (1962). Arthur Rimbaud. New Directions Publishing. ISBN 9780811201971.
- Stephan, Philip (1975). Paul Verlaine and the Decadence, 1882–90. Manchester University Press. ISBN 978-0-87471-563-7.
- Sterckx, M.; Vanraes, N. (1 January 2006). Dictionnaire des femmes belges: XIXe et XXe siècles. Lannoo Uitgeverij. ISBN 978-2-87386-434-7.
- Voizard, Pierre (1989). "Hommes et destines (Dictionnaire biographique d'Outre-Mer);chapter=Paul, Anthelme BOURDE (1851–1914)" (PDF). Archived from the original (PDF) on 21 February 2014.
