= Chaîne =

Chaîne may refer to:

== People ==
- Marius Chaîne (1873–1960), French scholar of Ethiopic and Coptic philology

== Places ==
- Chaîne des Puys, a north-south oriented chain of cinder cones, lava domes, and maars in the Massif Central of France
- Chaîne de l'Épine, the department of Savoie in southeast France
- Chaîne du Thaljah, a range of mountains in the Gafsa Governorate of Tunisia

== Entertainment ==
- Chaîne (novel) – a 1974 novel by Saidou Bokoum about Africans living in France.
- Radio Algeria radio stations:
  - Chaîne 1 in Arabic.
  - Chaîne 2 in Berber.
  - Chaîne 3 in French.
- La Chaîne Météo, a French TV channel, broadcasting weather forecasts 24 hours a day
- La Chaîne Disney, a Canadian French-language specialty channel

== Other ==
- Chaîne opératoire, a term used throughout anthropological discourse
