= Sathathormeryt =

Ancient Egyptian woman

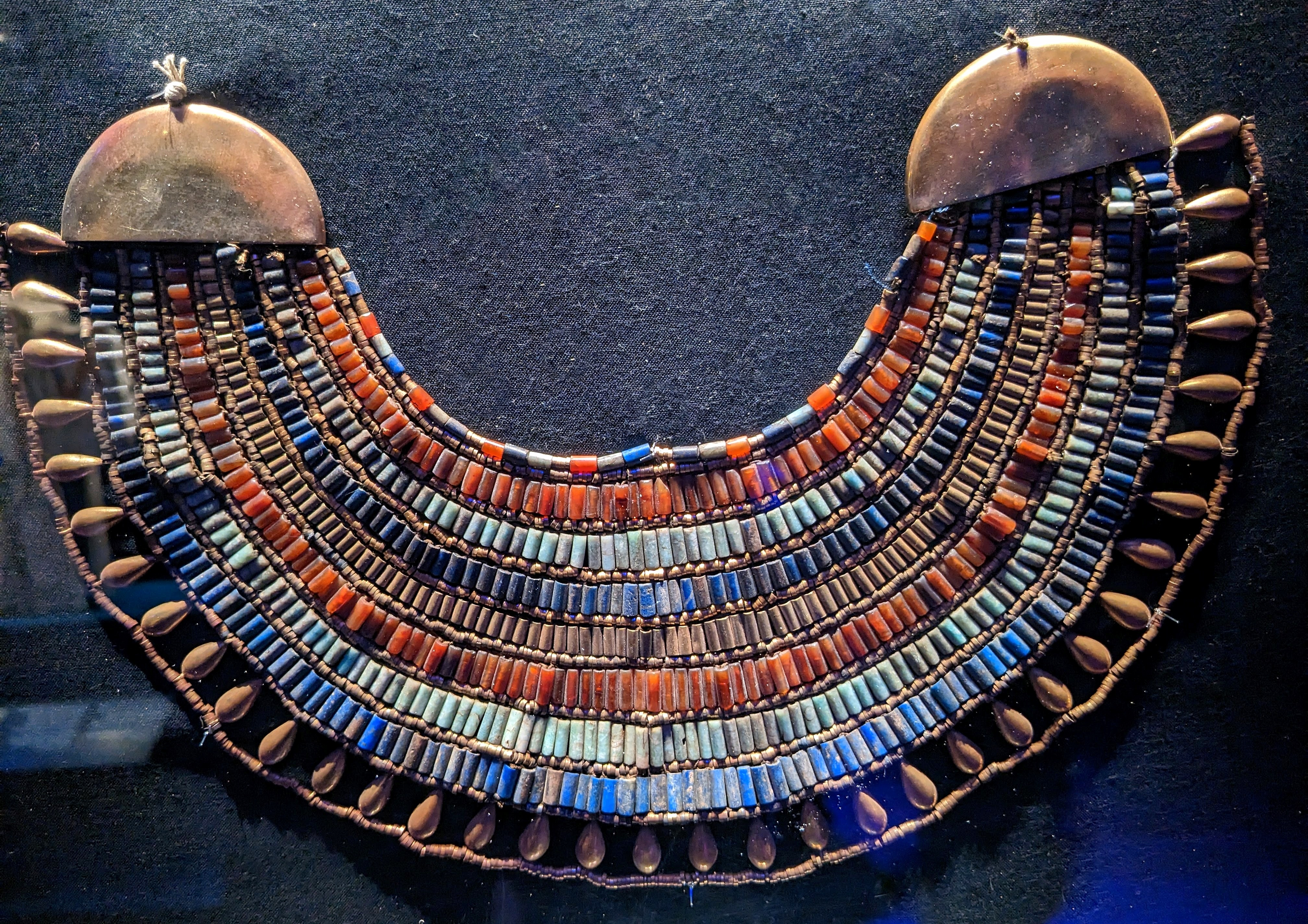
The Broad collar of Sathathormeryt made from gold, lapis lazuli, carnelian and feldspar.

Sathathormeryt, Sathathormery (or Sithathormerit) was an Ancient Egyptian woman known from her intact burial within the pyramid complex of king Amenemhat II at Dahshur. The burial was found in 1895 by excavations under Jacques de Morgan.

The burial of Sathathormeryt was found within a gallery tomb consisting of two burials, the other one belonging to the king's daughter Itaweret. Sathathormeryt does not bear any titles on her funerary equipment. Her status remains unknown, but she was presumably a member of the royal family.

== Biography ==
Little is known about Sathathormeryt other than that she belonged to the royal family of Amenemhat II, as is indicated by the location of her burial; a leading hypothesis is that she was his daughter. Julien Siesse, however, dates this burial to the end of the 12th Dynasty—like that of Princess Itaweret, with whom she is buried, as well as those of Princesses Ita and Khenmet, who share a nearby double tomb. However, this does not rule out the possibility that these princesses were daughters of Amenemhat II (they could have been born late in the reign of Amenemhat II and died early in the reign of Amenemhat III, given that only three decades separate the end of Amenemhat II's reign from the beginning of Amenemhat III's).

== Burial ==
A Life sized swan found in the burial of Itaweret.

Her intact tomb, oriented north-south and located slightly west of the tomb of Queen Keminub and the treasurer Amenhotep, was a double tomb, containing Princess Sathathormeryt on one side and Princess and Queen Itaweret on the other. It was built in an open-air cavity cut into the rock. A long, sloping brick corridor, lined with stones at the bottom, led to the entrance of the burial chambers. This was followed by a horizontal corridor, blocked along its entire length. The two sarcophagi were located to the right of the corridor and below its paving; the slabs covering the sarcophagi were thin, well-fitted, and laid without mortar. It is noteworthy that these slabs still bore the numbers assigned to them by the builders before they were laid.

According to the short description published by de Morgan, Sathathormeryt's sarcophagus was made of sandstone. Inside it lay a wooden coffin housing a mummy wrapped in linen, with weapons and scepters placed next to her mummy to its left. A second chamber contained offerings, vessels, small round tables set on single pedestals, a perfume chest holding eight alabaster jars—their lids inscribed with the contents—a wooden figure of a swan, and, finally, an inscribed canopic chest.

From an examination of the skeletal remains that might belong to her, Sathathormeryt was over 20 years old when she died

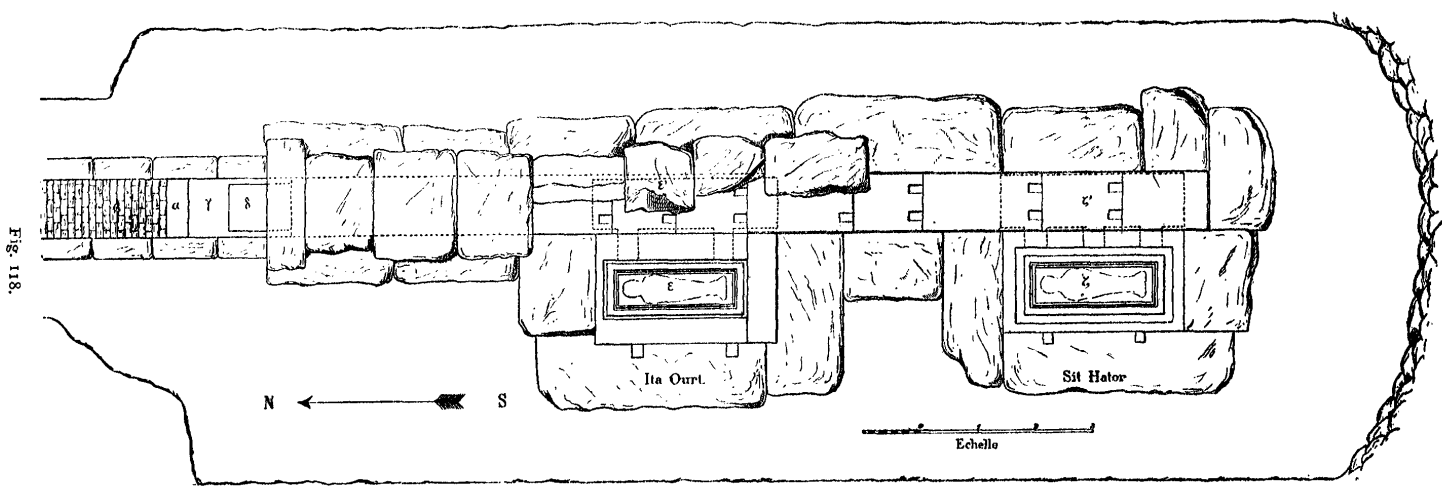
Plan of the gallery tomb of Sithathormerit and Itaweret

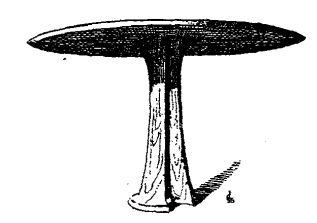
Table from the burial tomb of Sithathormerit

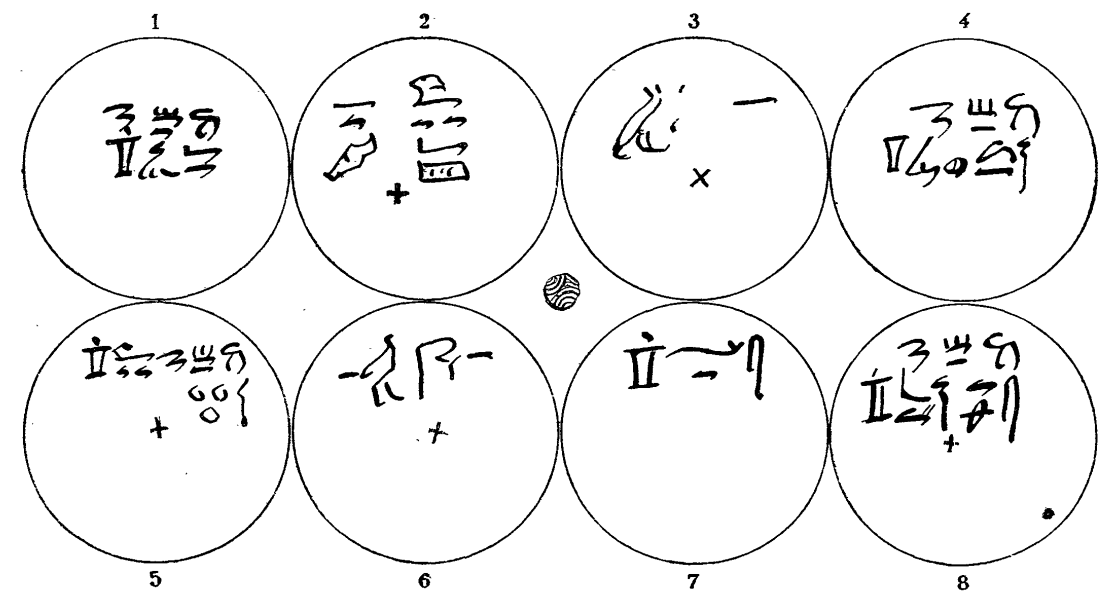
Inscriptions on the oil vessels of Sithathormerit
