= Victor-Auguste Gauthier =

French school teacher and amateur palaeontologist

- Born: 5 March 1837; Tonnerre, Yonne, France
- Died: 20 February 1911 (aged 73); Sens, Yonne, France
- Occupations: Teacher, palaeontologist

Victor-Auguste Gauthier (5 March 1837 – 20 February 1911) was a French school teacher and amateur palaeontologist. He specialized in the study of fossilized sea urchins, contributing meticulous descriptions of many fossils found in southern France, Algeria, Tunisia and Persia.

== Life ==
Victor-Auguste Gauthier was born in Tonnerre, Yonne, on 5 March 1837, son of a small winemaker. At an early age he was attracted to paleontology. He graduated from the College of Tonnerre, then was a maître répétiteur (Note: A maître répétiteur was a teaching assistant, responsible for maintaining discipline and helping the teacher with some lessons.) at the lycées of Sens and Orléans. He obtained a degree in Letters, then passed the agrégation in Grammar. He taught in turn at lycées in Pau, Le Puy, Moulins and finally, on 7 January 1864, at Marseille. During the nineteen years he spent in Marseille he devoted himself to the study of the Echinidae, a family of sea urchins, and made an important collection of the species of Provence. On 7 August 1883 Gauthier was named professor at the Lycée Michelet in Vanves and was soon promoted to the rank of officer of public instruction. Victor Gauthier died on 20 February 1911 in Sens at the age of 73.

== Work ==
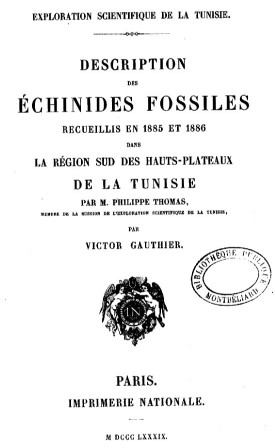

Gauthier's first works were collaborations. He described two newly discovered species in the Essai de Géologie et de Paléontologie Aveyronnaise by Pierre Reynès (1829–77), and then with Alphonse Péron (1834–1908) he engaged in the Description des Echinides fossiles de l'Algérie under the direction of Gustave Cotteau. This was a significant work, of which the first two chapters were published in the Annales des Sciences géologiques (1873) and in the Bibliothèque des Hautes études (1875). They were subsequently revised in 1883–84 to form part of the first volume of this great work. From 1873 to 1891 Gauthier worked constantly on the descriptions of the Algerian fossil Echinidae, for which Peron provided most of the materials, wrote the stratigraphic notes and collaborated with Gauthier on some of the descriptions. Cotteau retained overall responsibility and his opinion prevailed in questions of interpretations of genera and species and in general classification.

Gauthier generally avoided expressing opinions but gave very complete, detailed and precise descriptions on the species he studied, followed by a careful examination of similarities and differences of form with neighboring species. As publication of the work on Algerian fossile progressed Gauthier gained a deeper knowledge. He ventured to write a few short notes, the first on Echinidae near Marseilles, another on the Echinidae of the department of the Bouches-du-Rhone. From 1888 to 1895 Gauthier published a series of articles in the Annuaire géologique universel in which he analyzed the main works published at that time on Echinoderms.

In 1889 Gauthier published the important Echinides fossiles de la Tunisie. In 1893 Philippe Thomas published the palaeontology results of the Tunisian Scientific Exploration Mission (1885–86) in six instalments plus an atlas, giving the work of Victor-Auguste Gauthier (sea urchins), Arnould Locard (Mollusca), Auguste Péron (Brachiopods, Bryozoa and Pentacrinitess) and Henri Émile Sauvage (fish). First in collaboration with Cotteau in 1895, then alone in 1902, Gauthier described the curious Echinidae brought back from Persia by Jacques de Morgan. From 1898 to 1905 Gauthier published several Contributions à l'étude des Echinides fossiles in the Bulletin du Société Géologique de France. In collaboration with the engineer René Fourtau, in 1899 Gauthier published the Révision des Echinides fossiles de l'Egypte. This was soon followed by two notes on Egyptian fossils, and led to him being appointed a member of the Institut égyptien.

== Publications ==
- Cotteau, Gustave; Péron, Alphonse; Gauthier, Victor (1876–1884), Échinides fossiles de l'Algérie : description des espèces déjà recueillies dans ce pays et considérations sur leur position stratigraphique, Paris: G. Masson
- Gauthier, Victor (1889), Description des échinides fossiles recueillis en 1885 et 1886 dans la région sud des hauts plateaux de la Tunisie par M. Philippe Thomas, Paris: Impr. nationale
- Gauthier, Victor (1892), Notes sur les Échinides crétacés recueillis en Tunisie par M. Aubert, ingénieur des mines, au cours de ses explorations pour la carte géologique de ce pays, Paris: Annexe de la carte géologique de la Tunisie
- Thomas, Philippe-Étienne (1893), Exploration scientifique de la Tunisie. Illustrations de quelques fossiles nouveaux ou critiques des terrains tertiaires et secondaires de la Tunisie, recueillis en 1885 et 1886, Planches XII-XIV, dessinées d'après nature par M. F. Gauthier, Impr. nationale
- Morgan, Jacques de (1895–1904), Mission scientifique en Perse, vol. 3 parts II–IV, Etudes géologiques. Paléontologie, Part II. Echinides fossiles by G. Cotteau and V. Gauthier; Part III. Echinides fossiles (supplément) by V. Gauthier; Part IV. Mollusques fossiles by H. Douvillé, Paris: E. Leroux

== Sources ==
- Burollet, Pierre F. (21 June 1995), "L'exploration de la Tunisie avant la première guerre mondiale", Travaux du Comitée français d'Histoire de la Géologie (in French), 9 (3), Comité Français d'Histoire de la Géologie (COFRHIGEO) (séance du 21 juin 1995)
- Checchia-Rispoli, Giuseppe (1932), "GAUTHIER, Victor-Auguste", Enciclopedia Italiana (in Italian) – via Treccani
- Lambert, J. (6 June 1911), "Victor-Auguste Gauthier 1837–1911 Notice nécrologique", Bulletin, vol. 11, Société Géologique de France
- Maîtres répétiteurs (in French), ife: Institut français de l'Éducation
