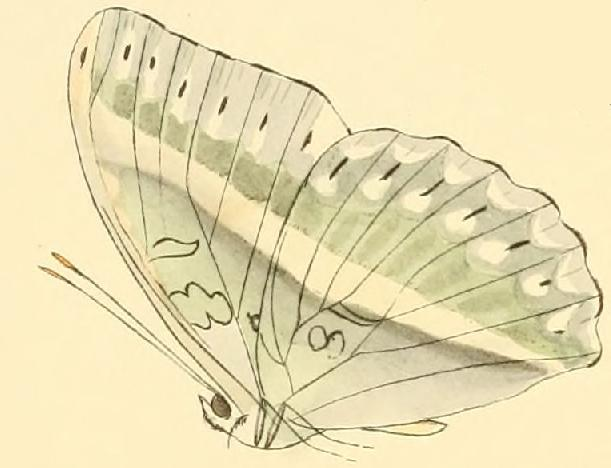

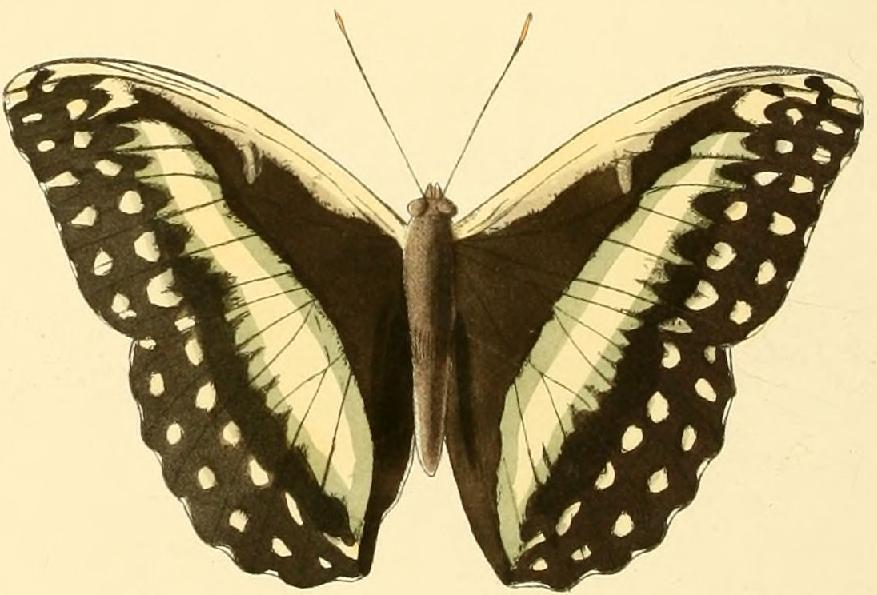

Scientific classification
- Domain: Eukaryota
- Kingdom: Animalia
- Phylum: Arthropoda
- Class: Insecta
- Order: Lepidoptera
- Family: Nymphalidae
- Genus: Cymothoe
- Species: C. oemilius

Binomial name
- Cymothoe oemilius (Doumet, 1859)

Synonyms
- Nymphalis oemilius Doumet, 1859; Harma hemeresia Hewitson, 1864; Harma frederica Distant, 1880; Cymothoe oemilius ab. achillides Schultze, 1916

= Cymothoe oemilius =

Striped glider

Species of butterfly

Cymothoe oemilius, the striped glider, is a butterfly in the family Nymphalidae. It is found in Nigeria, Cameroon, Equatorial Guinea, Gabon, the Republic of the Congo, the Central African Republic and the Democratic Republic of the Congo. The habitat consists of forests. Males are known to mud-puddle. The larvae feed on Caloncoba species.

== Subspecies ==
- Cymothoe ochreata oemilius (Nigeria: east and the Cross River loop, Cameroon, Gabon, Congo, Central African Republic, Democratic Republic of the Congo)
- Cymothoe ochreata fernandina Hall, 1929 (Bioko)
