= Philippe Thomas =

French veterinarian and amateur geologist

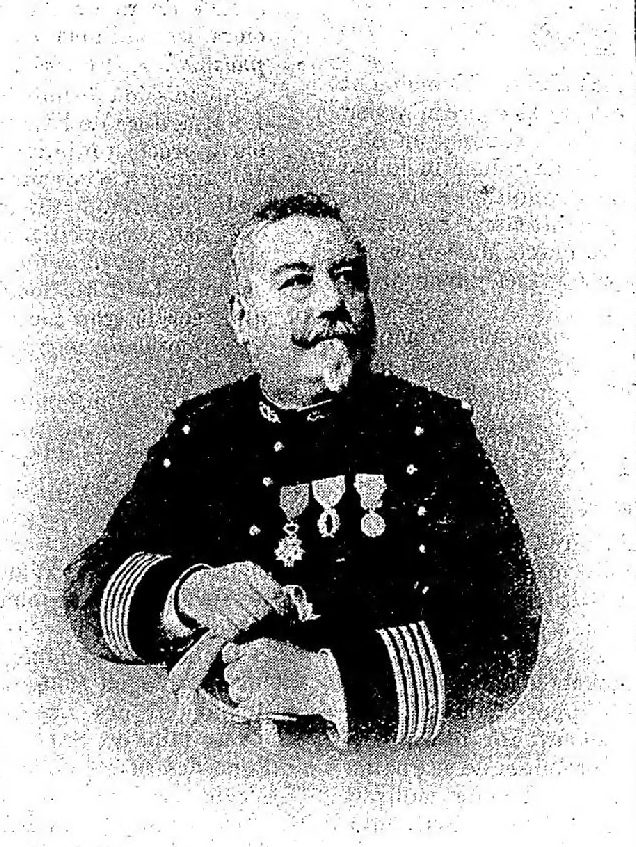
- Thomas in 1910 by Gaston Percheron
- Born: Philippe Étienne Thomas; 4 May 1843; Duerne, Rhône, France
- Died: 12 February 1910 (aged 66); Moulins, Allier, France
- Occupation(s): Veterinarian and amateur geologist

Philippe Thomas (4 May 1843 – 12 February 1910) was a French veterinarian and amateur geologist who discovered large deposits of phosphates in Tunisia. Despite the huge economic importance of his discovery, he received little recognition during his life. Monuments to Thomas in Tunisia were destroyed after the country gained independence.

== Career ==
=== Early years (1843–85) ===
Philippe Thomas was born in Duerne, Rhône on 4 May 1843. He attended the École nationale vétérinaire d'Alfort, where he was a brilliant student, and the Saumur Cavalry School. He was named an Army Veterinarian in 1865. He was assigned to Algeria but returned to France at the start of the Franco-Prussian War (1870) and fought in various engagements. He returned to Algeria after the war and took part in suppression of the revolt in the Kabylie in 1871. In his spare time, he studied geology, paleontology, and other scientific disciplines. Thomas became a qualified geologist.

Thomas classified the succession of Eocene (Note: The Eocene lasted from 56 to 33.9 million years ago.) rocks in Algeria from the Mediterranean coast to the Sahara, a succession that he would again find in southern Tunisia. In 1873, in the M'Fatah massif of Algeria Thomas was the first to discover the existence of phosphated nodules from the lower Eocene. In 1875, he studied the fluvio-lacustrine terrains of the Upper Tertiary and Quaternary, and published a series of notes on palaeontology and palaeoethnology. The first, on "Buhalus Antiqus" appeared in the Bulletin of the Climatological Society of Algiers. In the same bulletin, he reported the discovery of a prehistoric workshop in Hassi-El-M'Kadden, near Ouargla.

In 1876, the Société des Sciences physiques, naturelles et climatologiques d'Alger recognized his work between 1868 and 1875 in geology and palaeontology by awarding him a silver medal. This was soon followed by his admission to the Société géologique de France. Between 1880 and 1884, Thomas published several papers on his Algerian research, and with the mining engineer Jules Tissot (1838–83) investigated the Eocene formations in the Constantine region, where Tissot suspected the presence of calcium pyrophosphate. Thomas was the first to discover phosphates in the province of Ras El Aioun, Algeria.

=== Tunisian Scientific Exploration Mission (1885–86) ===
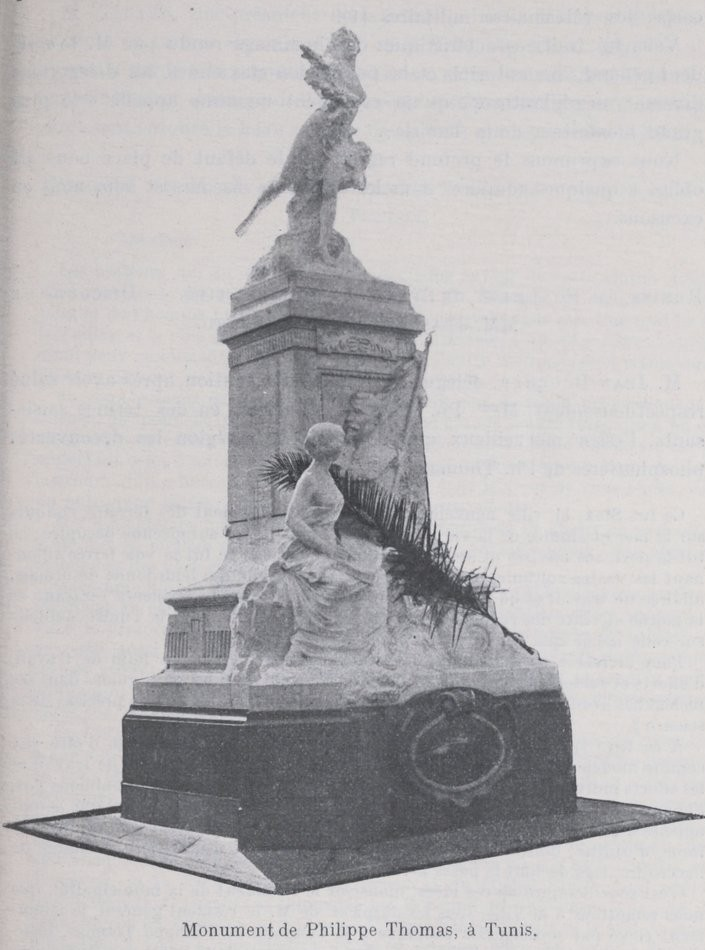
Monument to Philippe Thomas in Tunis

In 1882, Jules Ferry, Minister of Public Instruction, decided to create a mission to explore the Regency of Tunisia. The expedition was headed by the botanist Ernest Cosson, who had already undertaken eight study trips in Algeria between 1852 and 1880. It included the botanist Napoléon Doumet-Adanson and other naturalists. The botanists undertook their work in 1883 and 1884. In 1884, a geological section under Georges Rolland was added to the Tunisian Scientific Exploration Mission. Rolland was assisted by Philippe Thomas from 1885 and by Georges Le Mesle in 1887.

Thomas was 42 when he started his exploration of Tunisia. He was assigned to the expedition at the recommendation of the paleontologist Jean Albert Gaudry, and because Jules Ferry knew his ability and perfect knowledge of the Arabic language. Rolland covered the centre of the country, while Thomas worked further south and Le Mesle worked mainly in the north, apart from an expedition to the extreme south. The team gave good descriptions of the Jurassic of the Zaghouan region and the Eocene of the Maktar and Kairouan regions.

In 1885–86, Thomas explored the southern area of Tunisia between the meridian of Kairouan and the Saharan chotts, covering a vast area. He also explored the western area, which his colleagues had neglected, particularly the Chaîne du Thaljah or Chaîne du Tseldja mountains that stretch westward from Gafsa into Algeria. He identified the geology of the Gafsa chain with that of the M'fatah massif in Algeria and on 18 April 1885 found phosphates at Jebel Tselja. He found a brown or greenish gray limestone that on average contains 60% tricalcium phosphate near Métlaoui, where the Cretaceous limestone axis of the mountains joins the Eocene foundations. Thomas crossed the Chaîne du Tseldja through the dramatic gorges of the Oued and found identical phosphate deposits on the southern slope of the range extending for at least 80 kilometres (50 mi).

Thomas sent rock samples to the École des Mines de Paris for analysis, and on receiving the results on 18 October 1885, informed Dr. Cosson, head of the mission. The discovery had great economic and agricultural importance. With Cosson's authorization, he informed the French Academy of Sciences on 7 December 1885. He completed his observations in the 1886 exploration campaign in southern and central Tunisia up to Kalaat es Senam.

=== Later career (1887–1910) ===
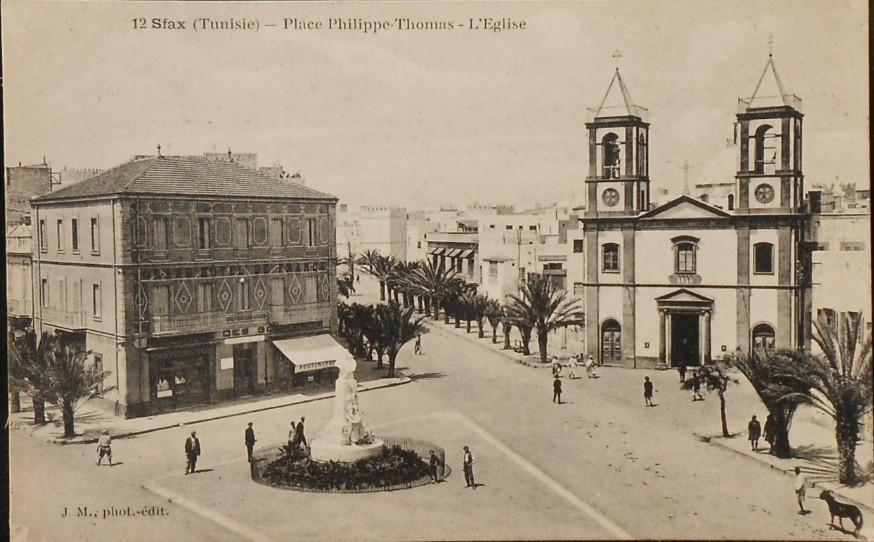
Place Philippe Thomas, Sfax. The bust of Thomas in the center of the square was later torn down.

Thomas sent a second note to the Academy of Sciences in 1887 and a third in 1888, in which he described his 1878 observations and the Algerian deposits. He did not have the time or resources to travel the Dyr of Tébessa to confirm the presence of the phosphates that he expected to be found there, but the deposit was found as predicted and was the first to be exploited. Philippe Thomas published the palaeontology results of the Scientific Exploration Mission in six instalments plus an atlas, giving the work of Victor-Auguste Gauthier (sea urchins), Arnould Locard (Mollusca), Auguste Péron (Brachiopods, Bryozoa, and Pentacrinitess), and Henri Émile Sauvage (fish).

Thomas was promoted to First Class Veterinarian in 1895. When he retired, he was made an officer of the Legion of Honour. In 1898, a member of the Institute of Carthage revived interest in his work. When the Sfax–Gafsa railway was inaugurated in 1899, Thomas was made a member of the Tunisian Order of Glory. In 1900, he was awarded a small pension of 6,000 francs. In 1904, he was awarded a gold medal by the Geographic Society of France. Thomas continued to send regular notes on his findings until 1909.

In 1902, the Ministry of Education proposed that Georges Rolland should write up the results of the Scientific Mission, but he refused for health reasons. The task was given to Thomas, who was now in retirement. He wrote the Essai d'une description géologique de la Tunisie with the support of Jean Albert Gaudry, Alphonse Péron, and Paul Bursaux, technical director of the Compagnie des phosphates de Gafsa. The first part, an Overview of physical geography, was published in 1907. The second part, Stratigraphy of the Palaeozoic and Mesozoic terrains, was published in 1908. Thomas described the great density of marine fauna at the dawn of the Tertiary that had created the layers of phosphates and the coastal fauna of the later Eocene layers characterized by the great vertebrates, particularly Sauria and giant turtles, and very numerous Plagiostoma bivalves. (Note: Thomas incorrectly named a skeleton Crocodilus phosphaticus. It was renamed Dynosaurus thevestensis by A. Pomel. It could also be called Dynosaurus phosphaticus.)

Thomas died before completing the third part of the Essai. In 1909, when he was dying of disease, the Société des Phosphates de Gafsa awarded him 25,000 francs, to be added to the 6,000 francs life annuity from the Tunisian government. Philippe Thomas died on 12 February 1910 in Moulins, Allier, France at the age of 66.

== Legacy ==
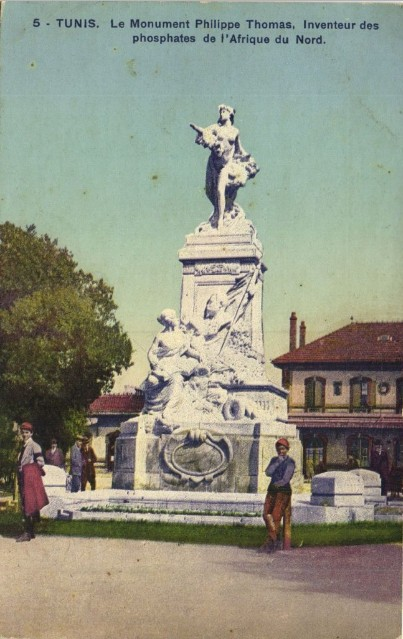
Monument in Thomas's memory in Tunis, since dismantled.

The third part of Thomas's Essai d'une description géologique de la Tunisie, which was to have described the Tertiary formations, was completed and published by his friend, Professor Léon Pervinquière (1873–1913), holder of the Chair of Geology at the Faculty of Science in Paris. Émile Haug published the Essai d'une description géologique de la Tunisie after Pervinquiere had also died and presented it to the Geological Society of France in session on 6 April 1914. The Vétérinaire Général Léon-Paul-Charles Vivien wrote,

When the French protectorate was established, Tunisia was a vast depopulated, barren, and arid country. The sea seemed to constitute the only usable wealth. Philippe Thomas called the attention of the industrial world to its soil. New deposits of iron, zinc, copper and manganese were successively discovered and Tunisia appeared as one of the richest mining regions in the world. Philippe Thomas had determined its future ..."

On 10 December 1908, the Bey Muhammad an-Nasir gave Philippe Thomas's name to the Metlaoui station in recognition of the prosperity that his discovery of phosphates of lime had brought to the country. A medallion was placed in front of the station. A monument with a bust of Thomas by the sculptor André César Vermare was inaugurated in Sfax by Gabriel Alapetite, Resident-General of France in Tunisia on 26 April 1913. Alapetite inaugurated another monument in honour of Thomas in Tunis on 29 May 1913. Thomas's bust in Sfax and that of the olive-grower Paul Anthelme Bourde were thrown down and shattered on the night of 3–4 January 1957. The monument in Tunis was toppled soon after. The fragments of the bust were recovered and sent to France, where they are held in the Philippe Thomas room in the Compiègne school of the Army Biological and Veterinary Service.

== Publications ==
Journal articles included:

- Thomas, Philippe-Étienne (1881), "Recherches sur les Equidés et Bovidés fossiles de l'Algérie", Bulletins de la Société Zoologique Française
- Thomas, Philippe-Étienne (1882), "Recherches statigraphiques et paléontologiques sur quelques formations d'eau douce en Algérie", Société Climatologique d'Alger
- Thomas, Philippe-Étienne (1884), "Quelques formations d'eau douce en Algérie", Société Géologique Française
- Thomas, Philippe-Étienne, La mer saharienne

Books include:

- Thomas, Philippe-Étienne (1880), Note sur quelques équidés fossiles des environs de Constantine, impr. de Boehm et fils
- Thomas, Philippe-Étienne (1880), Note sur une tortue fossile des terrains supérieurs du Mansourah (province de Constantine), impr. de Boehm et fils
- Thomas, Philippe-Étienne (1880), Recherches sur les sépultures anciennes des environs d'Aïn-el-Bey (près de Constantine, Algérie)., Impr. nationale
- Thomas, Philippe-Étienne (1884), Recherches stratigraphiques et paléontologiques sur quelques formations d'eau douce de l'Algérie
- Thomas, Philippe-Étienne (1888), Sur une forme ancestrale de "l'Helix (Leucochroa) candidissima" Draparnaud, impr. de Berger-Levrault
- Thomas, Philippe-Étienne (1891), Gisements de phosphate de chaux des hauts-plateaux de la Tunisie, impr. de Le Bigot frères
- Thomas, Philippe-Étienne (1893), Description de quelques fossiles nouveaux ou critiques des terrains tertiaires et secondaires de la Tunisie, recueillis en 1885 et 1886 : exploration scientifique de la Tunisie, Impr. nationale
- Thomas, Philippe-Étienne (1893), Exploration scientifique de la Tunisie. Illustrations de quelques fossiles nouveaux ou critiques des terrains tertiaires et secondaires de la Tunisie, recueillis en 1885 et 1886, Planches XII-XIV, dessinées d'après nature par M. F. Gauthier, Impr. nationale
- Thomas, Philippe-Étienne (1907–1913), Exploration scientifique de la Tunisie. Essai d'une description géologique de la Tunisie, d'après les travaux des membres de la mission de l'Exploration scientifique de 1884 à 1891 [-1892] et ceux parus depuis, Impr. nationale

== Sources ==
- Académie des sciences (January 1986), "Homage à Philippe Thomas (1843–1910)", La Vie des Sciences (in French), Paris: Gauthier-Villars
- Burollet, Pierre F. (21 June 1995), "L'exploration de la Tunisie avant la première guerre mondiale", Travaux du Comitée Français d'Histoire de la Géologie (in French), 9 (3), Comité Français d'Histoire de la Géologie (COFRHIGEO) (séance du 21 juin 1995)
- Cilleuls, Jean des (1969), A propos des phosphates de Tunisie et de leur découverte par Philippe THOMAS, vétérinaire militaire I1843-1910) (PDF) (in French)
- Ducloux (1913), "Philippe THOMAS (1843–1910)", Bulletin de la Société Centrale de Médecine Vétérinaire, Paris: Société de médecine vétérinaire (France) / Asselin
- Kazdaghli, Habib (September 2006), Rétrospective des politiques mémorielles en Tunisie à travers l'histoire des statues et des monuments (XIXe-XXe siècles) (PDF) (in French), Bucarest: Expériences et mémoire : partager en français la diversité du monde, archived from the original on December 22, 2015
- Notices liées ... Thomas, Philippe Étienne (in French), BnF: Bibliotheque nationale de France
- "Philippe Thomas (1863–1910), le vétérinaire épris de géologie", Tout Lyon (in French), 27 July 2014
- "Philippe Thomas", Le Site Sfaxien (in French), archived from the original on September 2, 2017
- Sur le Dynosaurus thevestensis (in French), ONM: National Office of Mines (Tunisia)
- Tawadros, Edward (2011-11-02), Geology of North Africa, CRC Press, ISBN 978-0-415-87420-5
