= Georges Le Mesle =

French geologist (1828-1895)

- Born: 21 August 1828; Paris, France
- Died: 31 December 1895 (aged 67); Bône, Algeria
- Occupation: Geologist

Georges Le Mesle (21 August 1828 – 31 December 1895) was a French geologist. He is best known for his work on the geology of northern and southern Tunisia, which he undertook between 1887 and 1891.

== Life ==
Georges Le Mesle was a geologist, paleontologist, correspondent of the National Museum of Natural History and member of the Scientific Commission of Tunisia.

Le Mesle was born in Paris on 21 August 1828. He became a corresponding geologist of the Museum of Natural History of Paris, which charged him with a mission to Indochina. He undertook useful work in Tonkin. Some of his photographs have been preserved by the Paris Society of Geography. The society calls them "photos of the Ba Keng Buddha, near Angkor, 1864", but the date is dubious since Angkor had only recently been found by European travellers.

Le Mesle visited Algeria several times, and built up a valuable collection of fossils, which were used by M. Peron in his works on Algeria. In the 1870s Le Mesle found tridactyl footprints in Algeria, which the local people attributed to a giant bird, a view that Le Mesle shared.

The botanist Ernest Cosson led the Mision Scientifique de Tunisie (Tunisian Scientific Exploration Mission) from 1885 to 1887. In 1884 a geological section under Georges Rolland was added to the mission. Rolland was assisted by Philippe Thomas from 1885 and by Georges Le Mesle in 1887. Rolland covered the centre of the country, while Thomas worked further south and Le Mesle worked mainly in the north, apart from an expedition to the extreme south. The team gave good descriptions of the Jurassic of the Zaghouan region and the Eocene of the Maktar and Kairouan regions. On the mission Le Mesle travelled with Jean Albert Gaudry.

Georges Le Mesle died on 31 December 1895 in Bône, in Algeria.

== Tunisian research ==
In 1888 Le Mesle published the results of his first exploration, which took place in April–June 1887, in the form of a daily journal that recorded minor facts and incidents of the journey along with scientific observations. Le Mesle made some preliminary trips around Tunis, then studied the peninsula of Cap Bon, which based on his observations formed an archipelago at the start of the Quaternary and did not become part of the continent until quite recently. He then investigated the region of Bizerte, where the substrate of limestones consists entirely of microscopic foraminifera. The foraminifera belonged the same genera as those found in chalk of the Paris basin, such as Globigerina, Textularia, Orbulina and Rotalina. Above these he found hard sandstone, alternating marls and soft sandstones from the Late Miocene or the Pliocene, and then an upper layer of sand and clay sandstones rich in fossils. He then studied the very difficult regions of Mateur, Beja and Kef. He confirmed earlier observation of phosphate deposits with commercial potential. At Djebel Zaghouan in Tunisia Le Mesle found Jurassic terrain in which Kobelt had discovered Perisphinctes Kobelti from the Oxfordian age. He collected Aptychus (from the lamellosi group), Peltoceras transversarium, Rhacophyllites tortisulcatus, Oppelia cf. Bachiana, Lytoceras cf. Liebigi and Perisphinctes cf. Kobelti.

In 1888, since Rolland had not been able to complete his investigation of the center, Le Mesle resumed his itinerary between Zaghouan and Kairouan in April, May and June. From there he went to Cherichira and Trozza, and then to Souk-el-Arba, Beja, Ain-Draham and Taharque before returning to Tunis. The mission was interrupted for two years due to the death of its head in 1889. Le Mesle then resumed his explorations between November 1890 and February 1891. He visited Medenine, the environs of Tataouine and Douirat and the Oudernas massif, where he discovered a very interesting Jurassic stage. At the end of this journey he described himself as being morally and physically in tatters, and he did not recover. His last two travel journals did not appear until 1899, after his death.

== Publications ==
Georges Le Mesle published very little himself, but donated his collections to the National Museum of Paris where others could study them.

- Le Mesle, Georges (1888), Mission géologique en avril-mai-juin 1887 : Journal de voyage, Exploration scientifique de la Tunisie (in French), p. 44

== Sources ==
- Burollet, Pierre F. (21 June 1995), "L'exploration de la Tunisie avant la première guerre mondiale", Travaux du Comitée français d'Histoire de la Géologie (in French), 9 (3), Comité Français d'Histoire de la Géologie (COFRHIGEO) (séance du 21 juin 1995)
- Carez, L.; Douville, H. (1888), Annuaire géologique universel (in French), Comtoir géologique de Paris
- Degroise, Marie-Helene, "Lemesle, Georges, 1828–1895", Photographes d'Asie (1840–1944) (in French)
- Gaudry, Albert (1896), "Séance du 20 Janvier 1896", Bulletin de la Société géologique de France (in French), vol. 24, no. 3, Société géologique de France
- Le Goff, Armelle (2005), Index nominatif des voyageurs et index géographique des destinations de leurs missions (PDF) (in French), Paris: Centre Historique des Archives Nationales
- Regnault, Serge (2003), "Palichnites et muséologie" (PDF), Le Naturaliste Vendéen (in French), 3
- Tawadros, Edward (2011-11-02), Geology of North Africa (in French), CRC Press, ISBN 978-0-415-87420-5
- Thomas, Philippe (1907), Essai d'une Description Géologique de La Tunisie (PDF) (in French), Paris: Imprimerie Nationale
