= Napoléon Doumet-Adanson =

French naturalist (1834-1897)

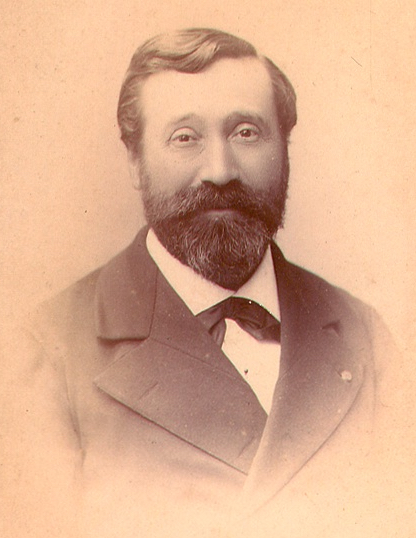
Napoléon Doumet-Adanson

Napoléon Doumet-Adanson (22 October 1834, Guéret – 31 May 1897 Château de Balaine (Villeneuve-sur-Allier) was a French naturalist. He was a botanist specialising in the flora of Tunisia . He was a founder member of the Société d'horticulture et de botanique de l'Hérault. Doumet was also interested in entomology. He was a Member of the Institut de France.

In 1882 Jules Ferry, as Minister of Public Instruction, decided to create a mission to explore the Regency of Tunisia. The expedition was headed by the botanist Ernest Cosson and included Doumet-Adanson and other naturalists. In 1884 a geological section under Georges Rolland was added to the Tunisian Scientific Exploration Mission. Rolland was assisted by Philippe Thomas from 1885 and by Georges Le Mesle in 1887.

== Works ==
- Doumet, N., 1859 Description de quatre nouvelles espèces de Lepidopteres. Revue et Magasin de Zoologie Pure et Appliquee (2)260–267.
- Doumet, N., 1861 Description de Lepidopteres nouveaux. Revue et Magasin de Zoologie Pure et Appliquee (2)171–178.
- Doumet, N., 1875 Note sur l'origine des chotts du sud de la Tunisie Revue des sciences naturelles
- Doumet, N., 1884 Projet de création en Algérie et en Tunisie d'une mer dite intérieure, devant le Congrès de Blois Extrait du compte rendu de la 13e session de l'Association française pour l'avancement des sciences tenue à Blois en 1884 Paris : au secrétariat de l'Association, 1885
- Doumet, N., 1888 Rapport sur une mission botanique exécutée en 1884 dans la région saharienne, au nord des grands chotts et dans les îles de la côte orientale de la Tunisie, exploration scientifique de la Tunisie Paris : Impr. nationale.

== Sources ==
- Bulletin du Muséum national d'histoire naturelle, 1944, p. 498–499
- Burollet, Pierre F. (21 June 1995), "L'exploration de la Tunisie avant la première guerre mondiale", Travaux du Comitée français d'Histoire de la Géologie (in French), 9 (3), Comité Français d'Histoire de la Géologie (COFRHIGEO) (séance du 21 juin 1995)
- Ducloux (1913), "Philippe THOMAS (1843–1910)", Bulletin de la Société centrale de médecine vétérinaire, Paris: Société de médecine vétérinaire (France) / Asselin
- Roux, Claudius (1910), Histoire des sciences naturelles et médicales en Bourbonnais
- Tawadros, Edward (2011-11-02), Geology of North Africa, CRC Press, ISBN 978-0-415-87420-5
