= Chaîne du Thaljah =

Mountain range in Tunisia

- Chaîne des Phosphates, Chaîne du Tseldja, Seldja Chain
- Location within Tunisia

Highest point
- Coordinates: 34.333333°N 8.166667°E

Geography
- Location: Gafsa Governorate, Tunisia

The Chaîne du Thaljah is a range of mountains in the Gafsa Governorate of Tunisia. Huge deposits of phosphates were found at the base of the chain on 1885.

== Exploration ==
The line of mountains runs in a roughly east–west direction from Gafsa in Tunisia to Negrine in Algeria, crossing the border not far from the small oasis of Tamerza. The highest point is the Jebel-Bliji. On the north side, at a place called Es Safia 5.5 kilometres (3.4 mi) south-southeast of Tamerza, a rock painting was found on an overhanging rock wall at the entrance of a deep ravine. It depicts animals and men in silhouette, in blood on a yellow-ochre background, all slightly glazed. It was probably made by Berbers between the Stone and Bronze Ages.

In 1885–86 the geologist Philippe Thomas explored the southern area of Tunisia between the meridian of Kairouan and the Saharan chotts, covering a vast area. He also explored the western area, which his colleagues had neglected, particularly the Chaîne du Thaljah or Chaîne du Tseldja mountains that stretch westward from Gafsa into Algeria. He identified the geology of the Gafsa chain with that of the M'fatah massif in Algeria and on 18 April 1885 found phosphates at Jebel Tselja. Thomas observed that at the junction of the Cretaceous limestone axis of the chain with its Eocene foundations there was a dark marl and a brown or greenish-gray limestone with a tricalcium phosphate content that averaged 60%. This was found where the Jebel Tseldja opens into the plain at Fous-Tseldja, near Métlaoui.

== Sources ==
- "Chaîne du Thaljah", Geographic.org, ITA
- Burollet, Pierre F. (21 June 1995), "L'exploration de la Tunisie avant la première guerre mondiale", Travaux du Comitée français d'Histoire de la Géologie (in French), 9 (3), Comité Français d'Histoire de la Géologie (COFRHIGEO) (séance du 21 juin 1995)
- Cilleuls, Jean des (1969), A propos des phosphates de Tunisie et de leur découverte par Philippe THOMAS, vétérinaire militaire I1843-1910) (PDF) (in French), archived from the original (PDF) on 2019-02-15
- Roux, Henri (1911), "Peinture Rupestre du Djebel-Bliji (Sud -Tunisien)", Bulletins et Mémoires de la Société d'anthropologie de Paris (in French), VI: 31–32, doi:10.3406/bmsap.1911.8311
