= Marie Adèle Pierre Jules Tissot =

French mining engineer and geologist (1838–1883)

- Born: 10 September 1838; Norges-la-Ville, Côte-d'Or, France
- Died: 25 November 1883 (aged 45); Constantine, Algeria
- Occupation: Mining engineer

Marie Adèle Pierre Jules Tissot (English: /tiːˈsoʊ/ tee-SOH, French: [ʒyl tiso]; 10 September 1838 – 25 November 1883) was a French mining engineer and geologist. He suspected the presence of deposits of phosphates in French North Africa, which were later discovered by the geologist Philippe Thomas. He is best known for a detailed geological map of the east of Algeria.

== Life ==
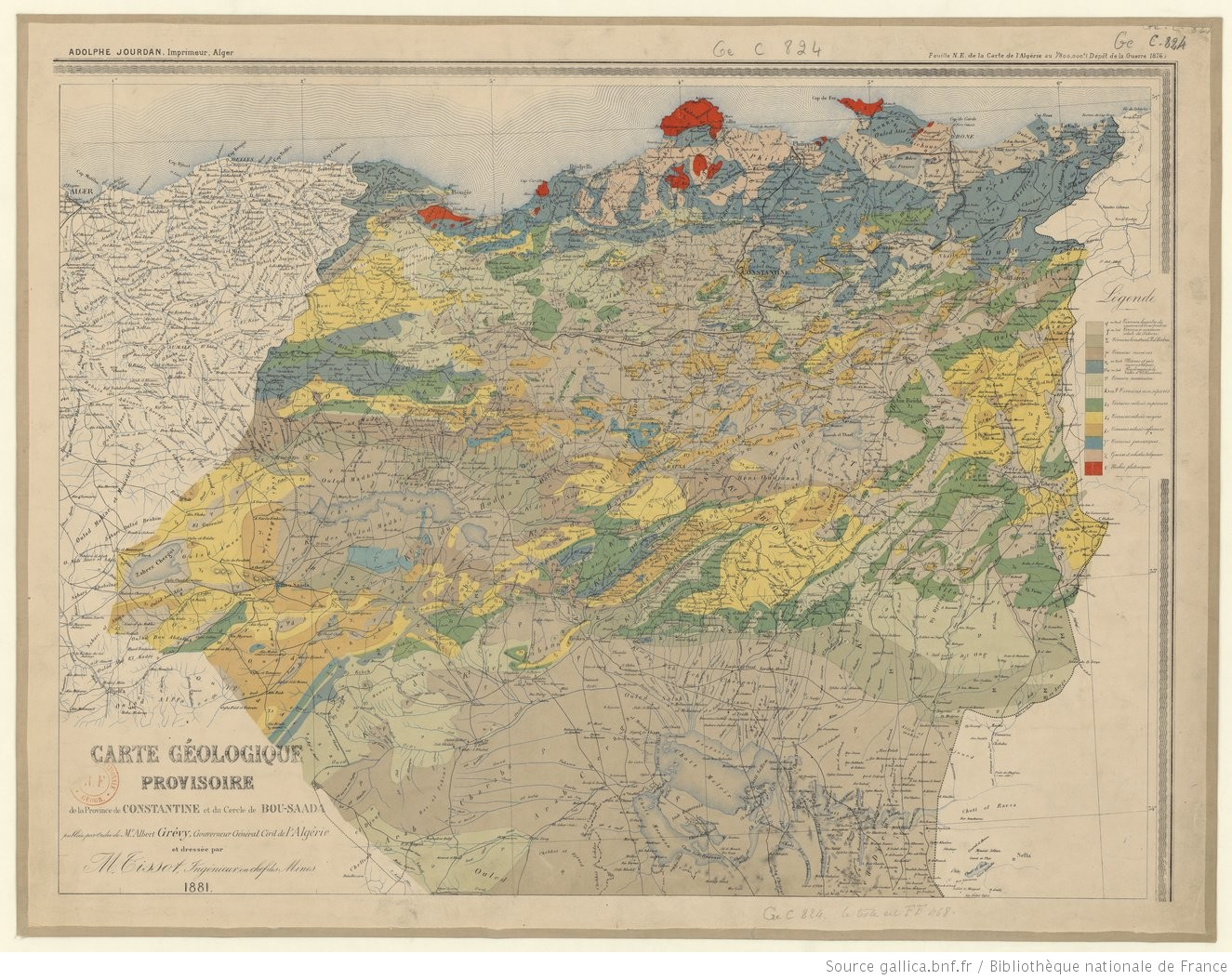
Tissot 's map of Constantine Province

Marie Adèle Pierre Jules Tissot was born on September 10, 1838. His parents were Claude Tissot, a postmaster, and Catherine Virginie Bernot. He entered the École Polytechnique in 1855, graduating 7th out of 144 pupils, then studied at the École des Mines de Paris. He became a member of the Corps des mines. Tissot was appointed Chief Engineer in Algeria, where his entire career was spent.

In 1873 Philippe Thomas, a young veterinary officer and geologist, found an exceptional limestone-marl zone in the Lower Eocene plateau at Aïn-Sba in the Fatah mountains south of Boghar. Some of the fossils were covered in a greenish or chocolate patina. He gave a sample to the military pharmacist at Boghar hospital for analysis, who found the substance was phosphate of lime. Thomas was stationed near Constantine, and was friends with Tissot between 1874 and 1880. When he told Tissot of his findings, Tissot was very interested. Tissot said he was not surprised, because he had always thought these marls or limestones must have phosphate since they produced the best corn fields in the province. Tissot reproduced this observation in a note on Algerian mineralogy he wrote for the Paris Exposition Universelle of 1878. Between 1880 and 1884 Thomas published several papers on his Algerian research, and with Tissot investigated the Eocene formations in the Constantine region.

Tissot's main task was map-making. He drew on the observations of his predecessors Charles Dubocq, Oscar Linder and Gustave Moevus to create a geological map of Constantine Province, published in 1881. It was a huge work, which took 20 years to complete, covering a large and difficult territory. His views on the origins of the world and the universe were so original that the administration refused to publish the explanatory text to his map. However, the map had considerable practical value.

Jules Tissot was exhausted by his work on the map, and died on 25 November 1883.

== Publications ==
- Jules Tissot, "Note sur les recherches d'eaux jaillissantes dans la plaine du Hodna, dans quelques autres parties de la province de Constantine", Rapport [de M. le général Desvaux] à M. le maréchal gouverneur général de l'Algérie, sur les forages artésiens exécutés dans la division de Constantine de 1860 à 1864., Marseille: impr. de Maurat-Comte, p. 53
- Jules Tissot (1878), Exposition universelle de Paris en 1878. Département de Constantine, notice géologique et minéralogique, Alger: impr. de J. Lavagne, p. 44
- Jules Tissot (1881), Texte explicatif de la carte géologique provisoire au 1/800.000e, du département de Constantine., Alger: A. Jourdan, p. 136

== Sources ==
- Cilleuls, Jean des (1969), A propos des phosphates de Tunisie et de leur découverte par Philippe THOMAS, vétérinaire militaire I1843-1910) (PDF) (in French)
- "Marie Adèle Pierre Jules TISSOT (1838-1883)", Annales des Mines (in French)
- Millot, Georges; Morin, Philippe (1986), "Centenaire de la découverte des phosphates d'Afrique du Nord par Philippe Thomas", La Vie des Sciences (in French), Paris: Académie des sciences / Gauthier-Villars
