= Voissant =

- Commune
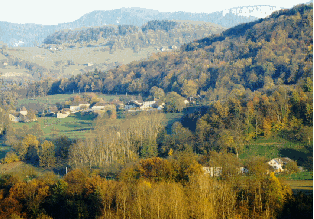
- A general view of Voissant
- Location of Voissant
- Location within France Location within Auvergne-Rhône-Alpes
- Coordinates: 45°29′04″N 5°42′38″E
- Country: France
- Region: Auvergne-Rhône-Alpes
- Department: Isère
- Arrondissement: La Tour-du-Pin
- Canton: Chartreuse-Guiers
- Intercommunality: Pays Voironnais

Government
  - Mayor (2020–2026): Bruno Cattin
- Area^{1}: 3.88 km^{2} (1.50 sq mi)
- Highest elevation: 788 m (2,585 ft)
- Lowest elevation: 269 m (883 ft)
- Population (2023): 246
  - Density: 63.4/km^{2} (164/sq mi)
- Demonym: voissigniauds
- Time zone: UTC+01:00 (CET)
  - Summer (DST): UTC+02:00 (CEST)
- INSEE/Postal code: 38564 /38620
- ^{1} French Land Register data, which excludes lakes, ponds, glaciers > 1 km^{2} (0.386 sq mi or 247 acres) and river estuaries.

Voissant (French pronunciation: [vwasɑ̃]) is a commune in the Isère department in southeastern France.

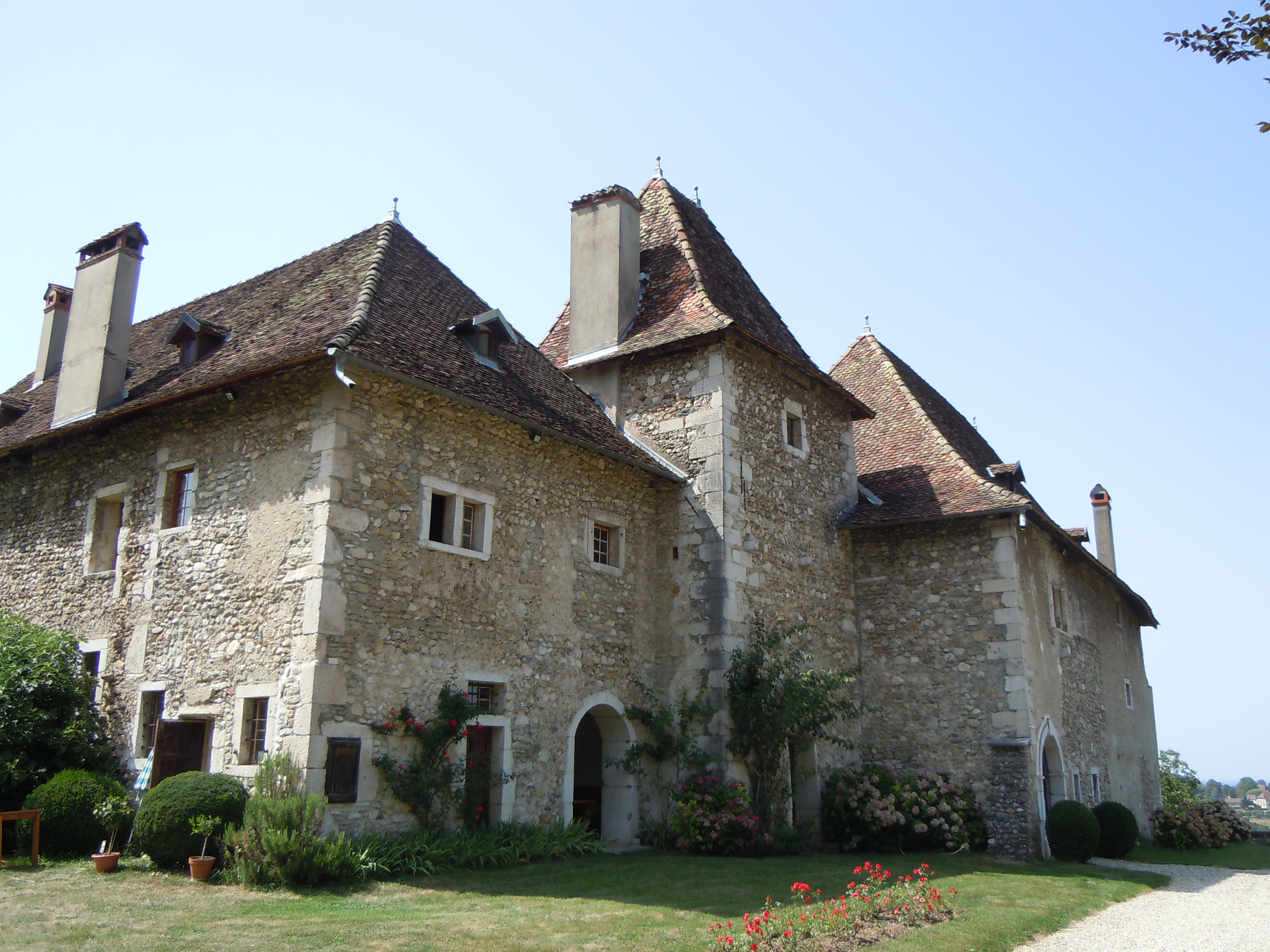
The castle of Voissant (16th century)

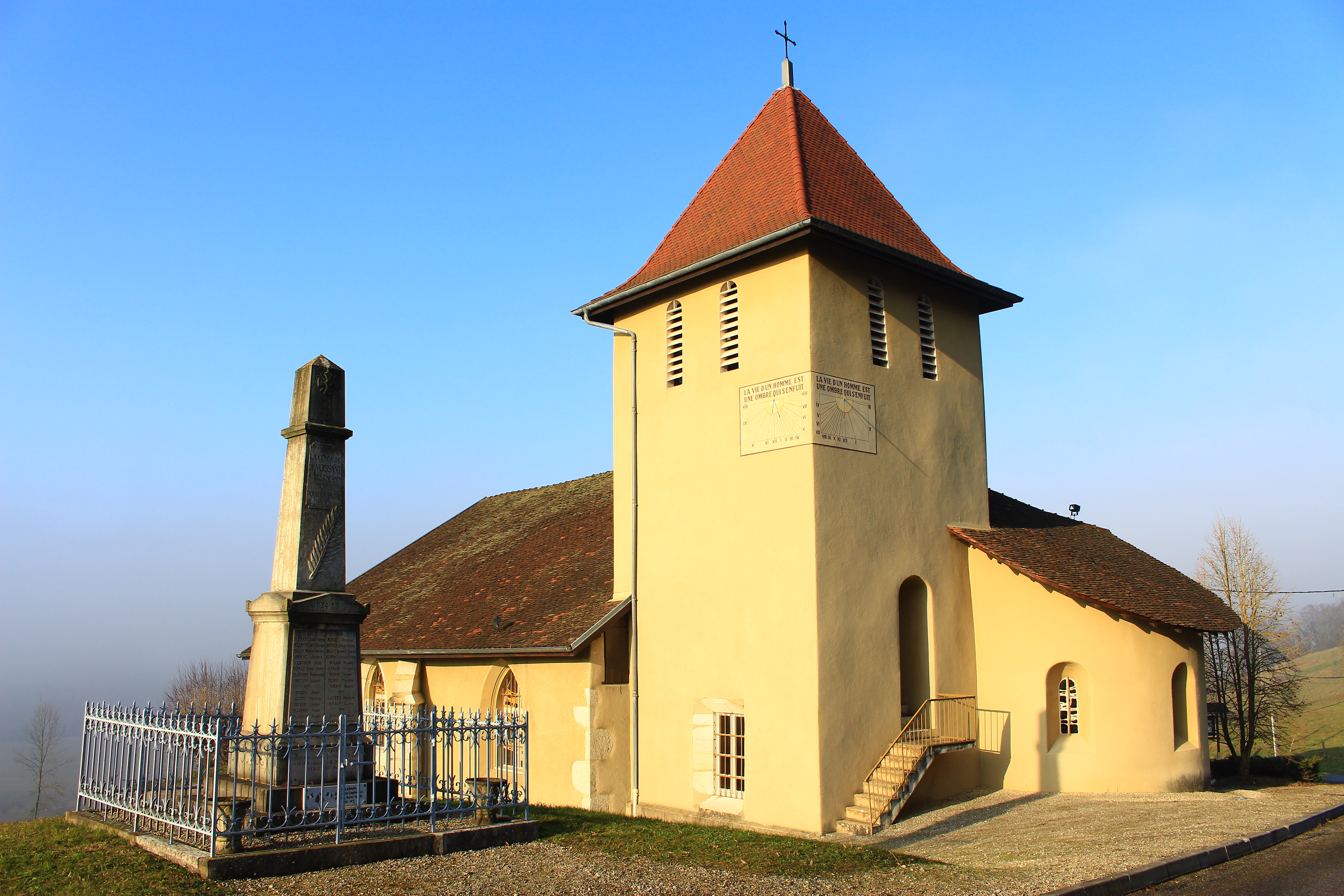
Church of Voissant (11th century)

== Population ==
Historical population
| Year | Pop. | ±% p.a. |
|---|---|---|
| 1968 | 218 | — |
| 1975 | 180 | −2.70% |
| 1982 | 165 | −1.24% |
| 1990 | 204 | +2.69% |
| 1999 | 208 | +0.22% |
| 2007 | 213 | +0.30% |
| 2012 | 212 | −0.09% |
| 2017 | 226 | +1.29% |
| 2023 | 246 | +1.42% |
Source: INSEE

== See also ==
- Communes of the Isère department
