= Gustave Cotteau =

French judge, naturalist and paleontologist

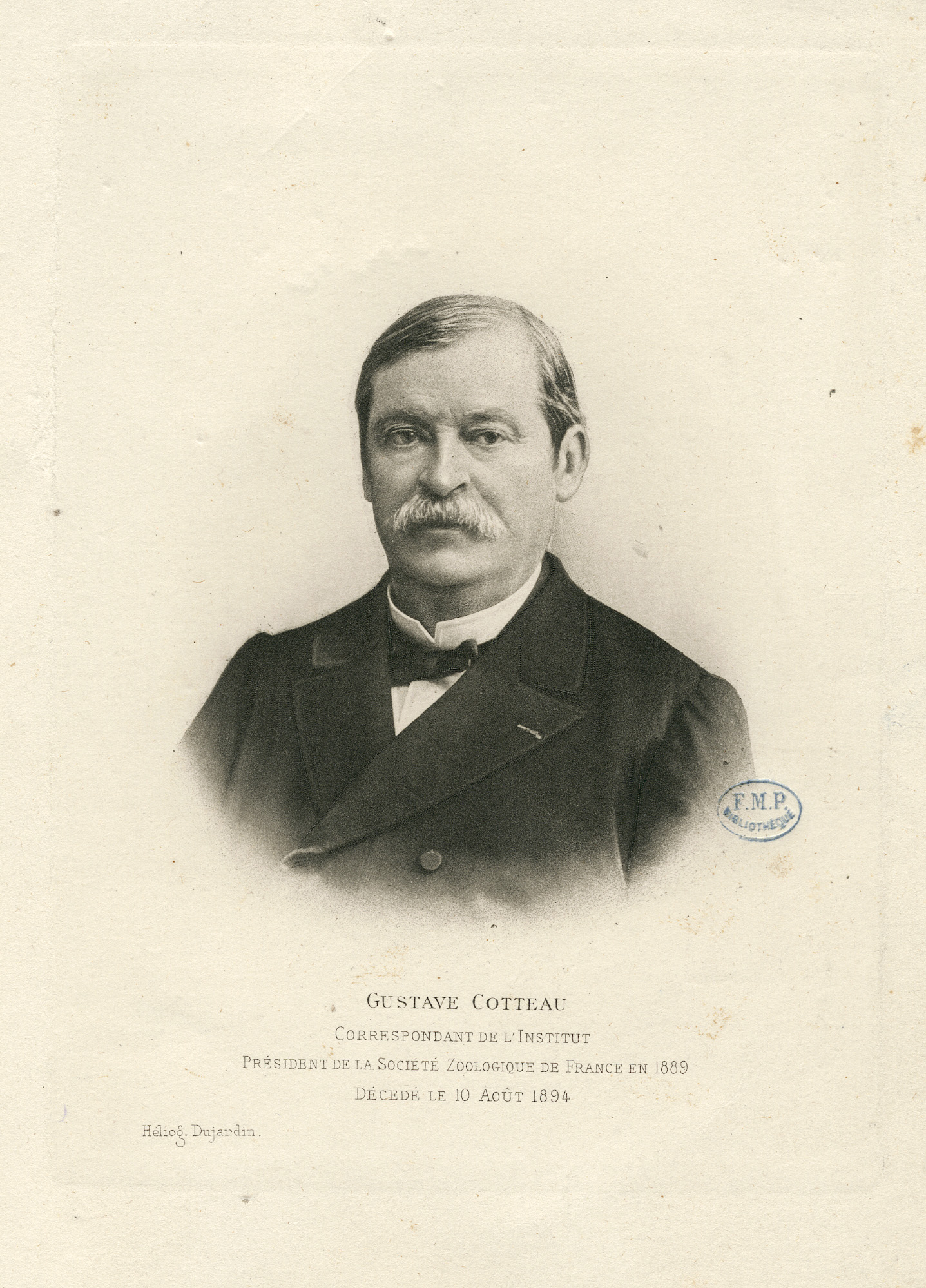
Gustave Cotteau

Gustave Honoré Cotteau (17 December 1818, Auxerre – 10 August 1894, Paris) was a French judge, naturalist and paleontologist.

== Biography ==
He was educated in classical studies at the college in Auxerre, then studied law in Paris. He earned his law degree in 1840 and in 1846 was named a deputy judge in Auxerre. Later on, he served as a judge in the civil court of Coulommiers and as a civil court judge in Auxerre. He was also curator of the city museum in Auxerre.

He is best known for his study of living and fossil echinoids (sea urchins), of which, he amassed a collection of more than 500 different species. He was the author of many works associated with Echinoidea, and circumscribed numerous echinoid taxa, such as the fossil genera Asterocidaris and Cidaropsis. With Jules Triger, he circumscribed the fossil family Archiaciidae (1869).

In 1874 and 1886 he was president of the Société géologique de France. He was also a member of the Société d'Anthropologie de Paris and of the Société des sciences historiques et naturelles de l'Yonne.

== Selected works ==
He was an editor of Paléontologie française, a multi-volume series on French paleontology begun by Alcide d'Orbigny in 1840. The following are some of his many written works:

- Cotteau, Gustave (1849), Etudes sur les Echinides fossiles du département de l'Yonne
- Cotteau, Gustave; Triger, Jules (1855–69), Échinides du département de la Sarthe considérés au point de vue zoologique et stratigraphique
- Cotteau, Gustave (1858), Echinides nouveaux ou peu connus
- Cotteau, Gustave (1863), Echinides fossiles des Pyrénées
- Cotteau, Gustave; Péron, Alphonse; Gauthier, Victor (1876–1884), Échinides fossiles de l'Algérie : description des espèces déjà recueillies dans ce pays et considérations sur leur position stratigraphique, Paris: G. Masson
- Cotteau, Gustave; Locard, Arnould (1877), Description de la faune des terrains tertiaires moyens de la Corse
- Cotteau, Gustave (1884), Die echiniden der Stramberger Schichten (in German)
- Cotteau, Gustave (1895), Description des échinides recueillis
