= Jean Albert Gaudry =

French scientist (1827–1908)

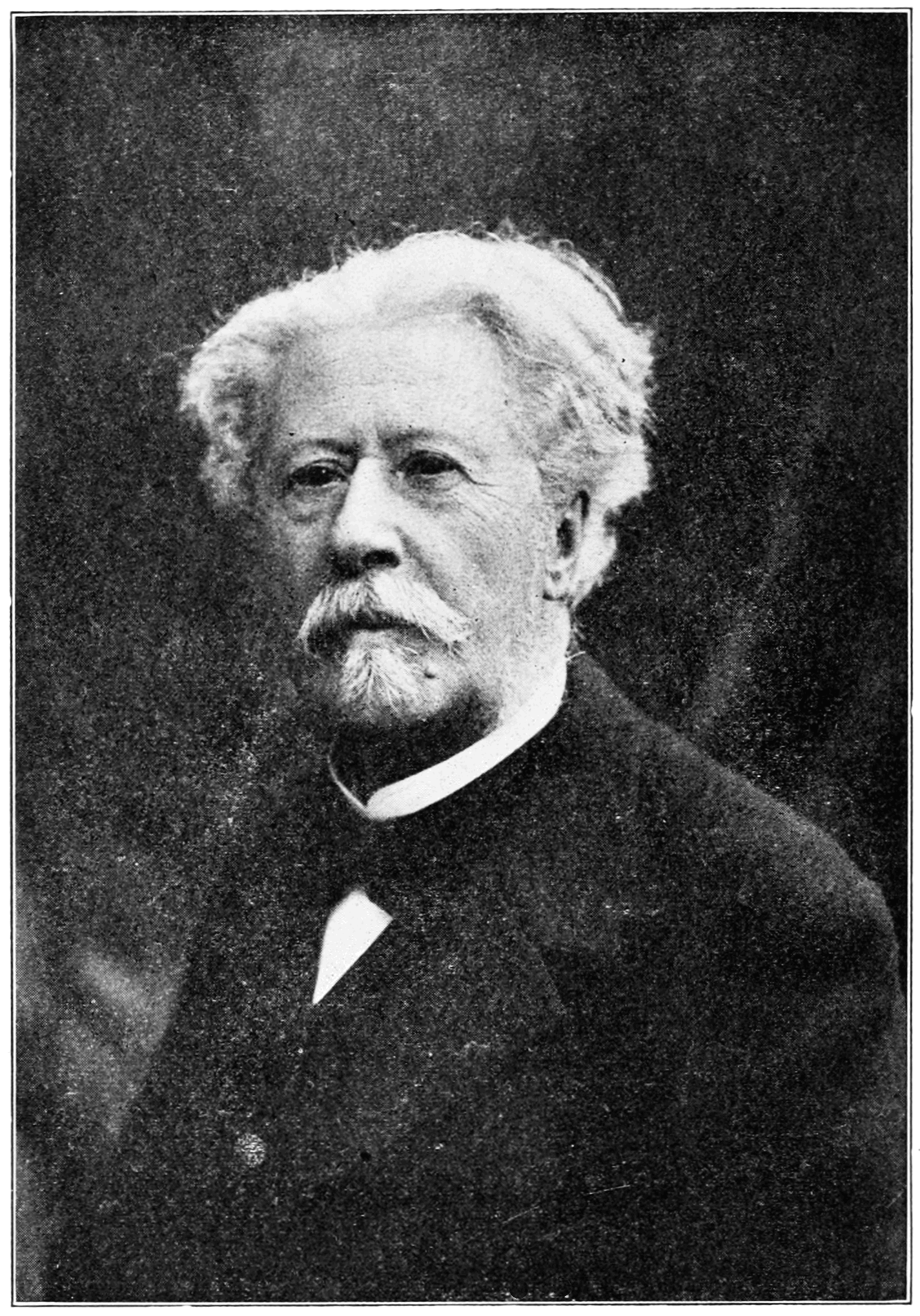
- Born: 16 September 1827; St Germain-en-Laye, France
- Died: 27 November 1908 (aged 81)
- Occupations: Geologist; palaeontologist
- Awards: Wollaston Medal (1884)
- Scientific career
- Thesis: Mémoire sur les pièces solides des Stellérides (1852)

Jean Albert Gaudry (16 September 1827 – 27 November 1908) was a French geologist and palaeontologist. He was born at St Germain-en-Laye, and was educated at the Catholic Collège Stanislas de Paris. He was a notable proponent of theistic evolution.

== Career ==
At the age of twenty-five he made explorations in Cyprus and Greece, residing in the latter country from 1855 to 1860. He then investigated the rich deposit of fossil vertebrata at Pikermi and brought to light a remarkable mammalian fauna, Miocene in age, and intermediate in its forms between European, Asiatic and African types. He also published an account of the geology of the island of Cyprus (Mém. Soc. Géol. de France, 1862).

In 1853, while still in Cyprus, he was appointed assistant to A d'Orbigny, who was the first to hold the chair of palaeontology in the museum of natural history at Paris. In 1872 he succeeded to this important post; in 1882 he was elected member of the French Academy of Sciences. In 1885 Philippe Thomas was assigned to the Tunisian Scientific Exploration Mission at Gaudry's recommendation. Later Gaudry helped Thomas write the Essai d'une description géologique de la Tunisie, which reported the results of the Tunisian research. In 1895 Gaudry was elected a foreign member of the Royal Society of London.

In 1900 he presided over the meetings of the eighth International Congress of Geology then held in Paris. He was elected a member of the Royal Swedish Academy of Sciences in 1900.

He is distinguished for his researches on fossil mammalia, and for the support which his studies have rendered to the theory of evolution. He has also occasionally studied other topics. Among others, he described Early Permian Haptodus baylei, whose affinities he could not determine at the time, but which is now known to be a synapsid closely related to therapsids.

Professor Huxley, comparing our present knowledge of the mammals of the Tertiary era with that of 1859, states that the discoveries of Gaudry, Marsh, and Filhol, are "as if zoologists were to become acquainted with a country hitherto unknown, as rich in novel forms of life as Brazil or South America once were to Europeans."

== Evolution ==
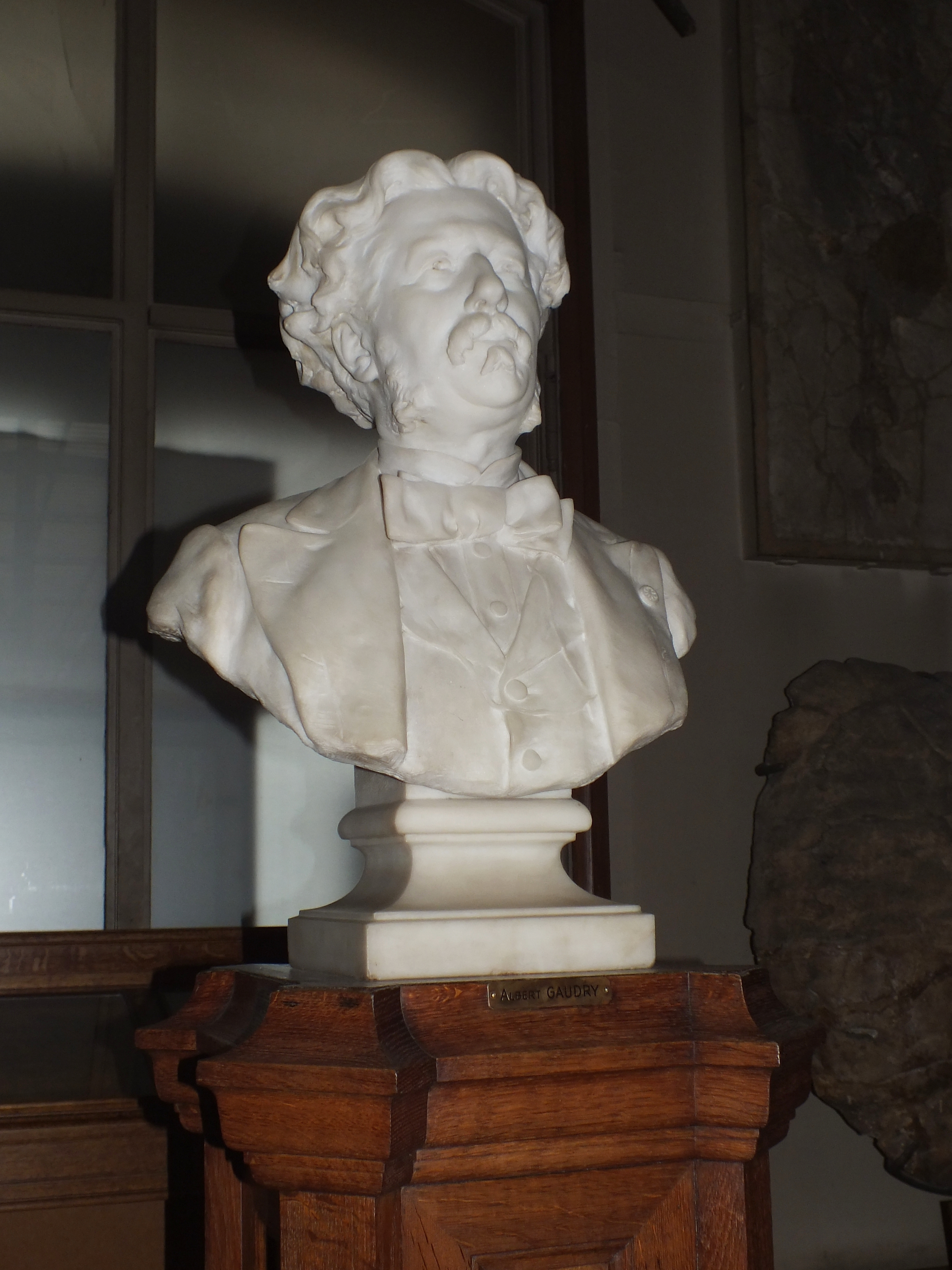
Bust of Albert Gaudry in Galerie de Paléontologie, of Muséum national d'histoire naturelle.

Gaudry was one of the first scientists to invent a phylogenetic tree for fossil forms in 1866.

Gaudry was an advocate of theistic evolution. In his book Essai de paléontologie philosophique (1896) he considered evolution to be a divine plan guided by God.

Charles Darwin cited Gaudry's palaeontological research from his excavations at Pikermi in the second edition of On Origin of Species, 1872 and The Descent of Man, 1871. His research was also positively cited by Alfred Russel Wallace. Gaudry discovered and reconstructed several new mammal species that he considered were intermediates, he believed these were evidence for evolution but differed from Darwin in believing they were the result of a plan by God.

Because of his spiritual beliefs, he rejected the idea of natural selection and struggle for existence. Paleontologist Éric Buffetaut has written that "Gaudry's strong religious feelings made it difficult for him to accept Darwin's mechanistic vision of an evolution based on chance and natural selection. Evolution was acceptable to him because it revealed a unity in the organic world which was the mark of divine works."

== Publications ==
- Animaux fossiles et géologie de l'Attique (2 vols., 1862–1867)
- Considérations Générales sur les Animaux Fossiles de Pikermi (1866)
- Cours de paléontologie (1873)
- Animaux fossiles du Mont Lebéron (1873)
- Les Enchaînements du monde animal dans les temps géologiques (Mammifères tertiaires, 1878; Fossiles primaires, 1883; Fossiles secondaires, 1890)
- Essai de paléontologie philosophique (1896)

Brief memoir with portrait in Geol. Mag. (1903), p. 49.

Source: Woodward 1911

== Quotes ==
If we recognise that organised beings have little by little been transformed, we shall regard them as plastic substances which an artist has been pleased to knead during the immense course of ages, lengthening here, broadening or diminishing there, as the sculptor, with a piece of clay, produces a thousand forms, following the impulse of his genius. But we shall not doubt that the artist was the Creator himself, for each transformation has borne a reflection of his infinite beauty.

== Notes ==
Awards
Preceded by William Thomas Blanford	Wollaston Medal; 1884	Succeeded by George Busk
