= Le Chatelier =

Le Chatelier can refer to:

- Alfred Le Chatelier (1855–1929), French soldier, explorer and professor
- Bénédicte Le Chatelier (born 1976), French television journalist
- Henry Louis Le Chatelier (1850–1936), 19th-century chemist
  - Le Châtelier's principle, named after Henry Louis Le Chatelier
- Louis Le Chatelier (1815–1873), 19th-century chemist and industrialist, father of Henri Louis
- Le Châtelier, a commune in the Marne département, France

== See also ==
- Les Châteliers, a commune in Nouvelle-Aquitaine, France
