= Anatole-Joseph Toulotte =

Bishop Anatole-Joseph Toulotte M. Afr.
- Vicar Apostolic of Sahara and Sudan
- Church: Catholic Church
- Diocese: Sahara and Sudan
- Appointed: 4 March 1893
- Retired: 18 October 1897
- Predecessor: Charles Lavigerie
- Successor: Augustin Hacquard

Orders
- Ordination: 12 July 1891
- Consecration: 4 March 1893 by Barthélemy Clément Combes

Personal details
- Born: 7 January 1852 Lisbourg, Pas-de-Calais, France
- Died: 23 January 1907 (aged 55) Rome, Italy
- Denomination: Christian
- Occupation: Missionary

Anatole-Joseph Toulotte (7 January 1852 – 23 January 1907) was a French White Fathers missionary who was Vicar Apostolic of Sahara and Sudan from 1893 to 1897. Under his leadership the first White Fathers missions were established in the French Sudan (Mali) at Ségou and Timbuktu. A solitary, ascetic person, he was not a natural leader and drove himself too hard without regard for his health. He retired in 1897 due to physical and mental exhaustion after a long trip in West Africa. He is known as coauthor of a monumental history of Christian Africa in ancient times.

== Life ==
=== Early years (1852–74) ===
Anatole-Joseph Toulotte was born on 7 January 1852 in Lisbourg, Pas-de-Calais, in the diocese of Arras. He attended the college of Montreuil, Pas-de-Calais, for his secondary education. He entered the Grand Seminary of Arras in 1871. He was inspired by a visit of Father Félix Charmetant^{(fr)} and decided to become a missionary. He arrived in Algiers in February 1873 with his co-student Léonce Bridoux, the future bishop, to begin his novitiate. He was ordained a priest of the White Fathers on 24 October 1874.

=== Missionary (1874–91) ===
Toulotte perfected his Arabic and taught this language in the novitiate. In 1875 he was elected a member of the General Council of the White Fathers, and was also given direction of the Arab novitiate or Petit Noviciat. He was then assigned to the Sahara for two years, where he met the young Father Siméon Lourdel. After this he was assigned to Jerusalem as part of the first team of White Fathers in this city, where he remained for two years. He showed great ability for the study of languages and ancient documents. He was somewhat solitary and ascetic, and did not always fit well into the life of the community. In September 1880 he was named assistant general and returned to Algiers, where Cardinal Charles Lavigerie gave him direction of the novitiate.

A few months later Toulotte volunteered to leave in a planned caravan to Equatorial Africa. Lavigerie named him superior of the fourth caravan but then, perhaps due to shortage of personnel, cancelled this appointment and asked him to return to Jerusalem. Two years later in 1884 Toulotte was assigned to La Marsa, near Tunis, with three other researchers. They were tasked with preparing publication of a monumental history of ancient Christian Africa. He continued this work in Rome in a new community established there in 1886.

=== Apostolic vicariate (1891–97) ===
The Apostolic Prefecture of the Sahara and the Sudan became an apostolic vicariate in 1891. Lavigerie appointed Toulotte the coadjutor bishop. He left Rome to take up this position. Toulotte was a meticulous academic and a solitary ascetic, not a leader. The cardinal would have preferred the more outgoing Augustin Hacquard to head the apostolic vicariate, but the White Fathers council had selected Toulotte due to his saintly reputation. Toulotte became Apostolic Administrator of Sahara and Sudan on 29 May 1891. On 2 June 1891 he was appointed Titular Bishop of Thagaste. He was ordained in the cathedral of Algiers in the Archdiocese of Algiers on 12 July 1891. (Note: The Frères Armés du Sahara made their first appearance at the July 1891 ceremony where Lavigerie consecrated Toulotte as coadjutor. This was a force of lay brothers dedicated to liberating and protecting slaves. They wore what has been called a "comic opera uniform", with a red cross on the chest and a gold cross surmounted by a red plume on the helmet. The French press ridiculed and reviled the "Catholic brigands of the Sahara", who were disbanded in October 1892.)

Lavigerie died at Algiers on 26 November 1892. Toulotte automatically became Vicar Apostolic after the cardinal's death. Toulotte was appointed Vicar Apostolic of Sahara and Sudan on 4 March 1893. His principal consecrator was Barthélemy Clément Combes, Bishop of Constantine. At this time the vicariate had five missions in the M'zab but none in the Sudan. Toulotte based himself at Ghardaïa, Algeria, and travelled widely to visit the existing White Fathers missions and to found new ones.

Toulotte decided to organize a mission in the Sudan, and in 1894 was given permission to enter the Sudan from Senegal with a mission headed by a Frenchman. The Ministry of the Colonies issued the authorization on 9 November 1894 and on 25 December 1894 the first caravan, four White Fathers, left from Marseille. Hacquard was the leader of this group, which reached Ségou on the Niger River on 1 April 1895. Toulotte visited Ségou and Timbuktu in 1896–97. The long trip of several months took him to the loop of the Niger River and to the Atlantic coast at Conakry in what is now Guinea. He was ascetic and unsparing of his health, and at the end of this trip was exhausted and on the verge of a nervous breakdown.

=== Last years (1897–1907) ===
On his return to Europe Toulotte said he wanted to retire. His request was immediately accepted by the Holy See on the advice of Bishop Léon Livinhac, superior of the White Fathers, who had noted his extreme physical and mental exhaustion. Toulotte resigned on 18 October 1897. He was succeeded by Hacquard. Toulotte retired to Rome, where he recovered his health while living an almost hermit-like life. Anatole-Joseph Toulotte died in Rome on 23 January 1907. He left a reputation of great sanctity.

== Publications ==
Publications by Anatole Toulotte include:

- Mesnage, Joseph; Toulotte, Anatole (1912), L'Afrique chrétienne : évêchés et ruines antiques, Description de l'Afrique du Nord. Musées et collections archéologiques de l'Algérie et de la Tunisie, vol. 17, d'après les manuscrits de Mgr Toulotte et les découvertes archéologiques les plus récentes; par le P. J. Mesnage, Paris: E. Leroux, p. 592
- Toulotte, Anatole; Morcelli, Stefano Antonio (1892–1894), Géographie de l'Afrique chrétienne, vol. 1–4, Rennes / Montreuil-sur-Mer: impr. de Oberthur / Impr. de Notre-Dame des Prés

== Sources ==
- Anatole Toulotte (1852-1907) (in French), BnF: Bibliotheque nationale de France
- Barwick, George Frederick (1911), "Lavigerie, Charles Martial Allemand" , in Chisholm, Hugh (ed.), Encyclopædia Britannica, vol. 16 (11th ed.), Cambridge University Press, pp. 293–294
- Ceillier, Jean-Claude (2008), Histoire des missionnaires d'Afrique (Pères blancs): de la fondation par Mgr Lavigerie à la mort du fondateur (1868-1892) (in French), KARTHALA Editions, ISBN 978-2-84586-983-7
- Cheney, David M. (January 2018), "Bishop Anatole-Joseph Toulotte, M. Afr. †", Catholic Hierarchy
- Shorter, Aylward (2003), "Hacquard, Prosper Augustin", Dictionary of African Christian Biography
- Shorter, Aylward (5 December 2011), Les Pères Blancs au temps de la conquête coloniale. Histoire des Missionnaires d'Afrique 1892-1914 (in French), KARTHALA Editions, ISBN 978-2-8111-5003-7
- Vanrenterghem, Joseph (February 2005), MONSEIGNEUR AUGUSTIN HACQUARD (in French), Bry-sur-Marne: Pères Blancs
