= Antoine Bernard d'Attanoux =

French soldier, journalist and explorer (1853–1954)

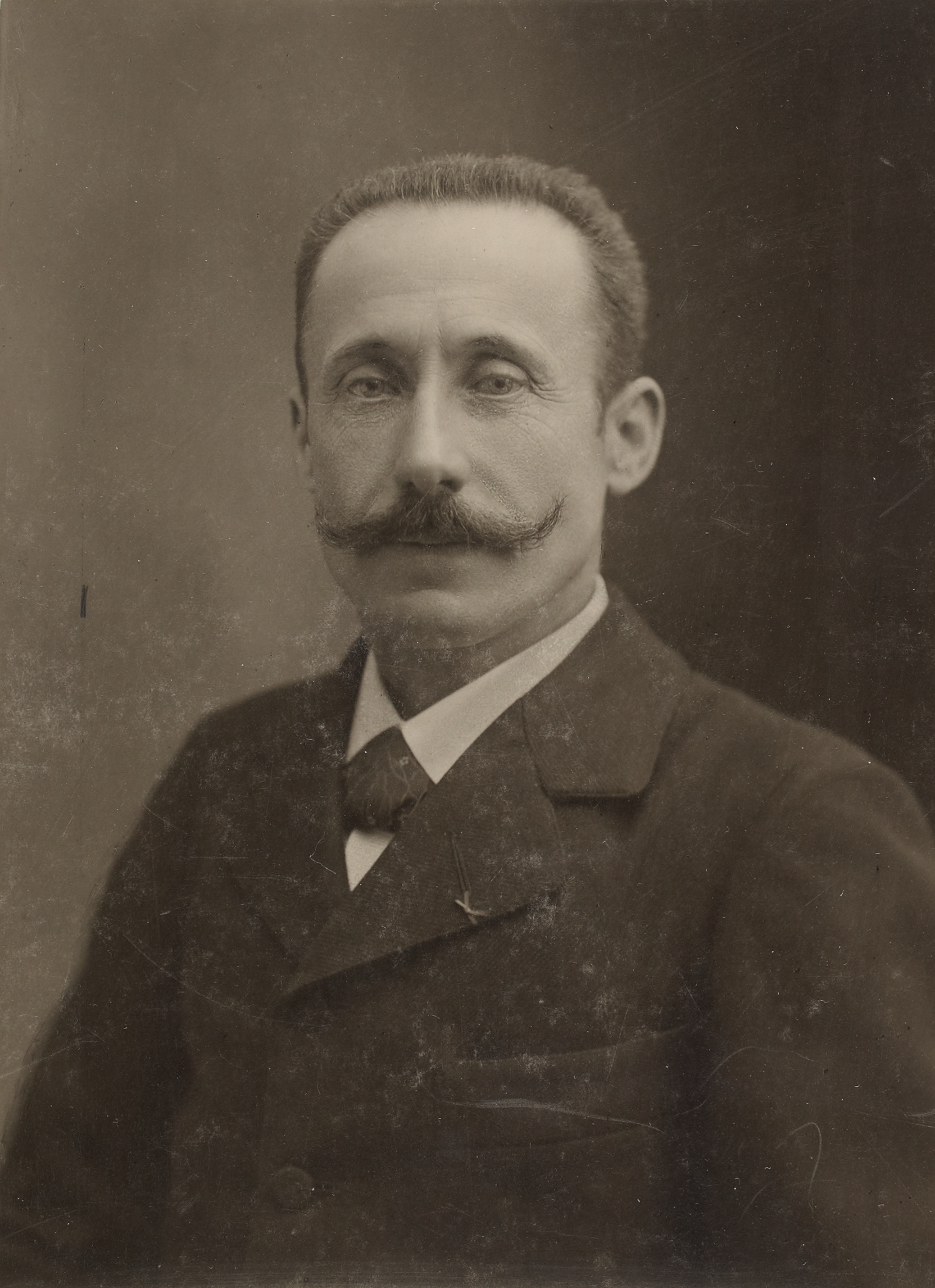
- Antoine Bernard d'Attanoux in 1897 by Nadar
- Born: Antoine-Casimir-Joseph Bernard; 18 March 1853; Aix-en-Provence, France
- Died: December 1954 (aged 101); Nice, France
- Occupations: Journalist, explorer

Antoine Bernard d'Attanoux (18 March 1853 – December 1954) was a French soldier, journalist and explorer. After leaving the army he spent several years in Morocco as correspondent for the newspaper Le Temps. He is known for a mission he undertook in 1893–94 to contact the Ajjer Tuaregs in the south of Algeria.

== Early years ==
Antoine-Casimir-Joseph Bernard was born on 18 March 1853 in Aix-en-Provence. His parents were Charles-Jean-Baptiste Bernard and Amélie Coulomb. He was descended from Joseph-Ignace d'Attanoux, lord of Roquebrune in 1696. He attended the École spéciale militaire de Saint-Cyr from 1872 to 1873. He was appointed sub-lieutenant in the 2nd Light Infantry Battalion (chasseurs à pied). He attended the École Normale de Tir, graduating with 2nd prize in 1875. He was made a lieutenant in the 3rd regiment of Algerian Tirailleurs in 1878. He left the army on 18 September 1880. On 4 December 1880 Antoine Bernard and his father added "d'Attanoux" to their surnames.

== Africa ==
Bernard d'Attanoux became a contributor to the newspaper Le Temps. He lived in Morocco from 1884 to 1886. He travelled in Morocco in 1884, 1885, 1886, 1887 and 1892, and published articles on his findings in Le Temps. In 1892–93 he undertook voyages and missions for Le Temps in Algeria, Tunisia and Tripolitania.

Locations in Algeria

Bernard d'Attanoux participated in 1893 in the commercial mission led by Gaston Méry from Algeria towards the Sudan. The expedition lasted from October 1893 to April 1894. It went south from Biskra past Touggourt and Ouargla, past Aïn Taïba, El Biodh and Temassinin, and along the Ighargharen valley to Lake Menghough. The French members were Méry, Attanoux, Albert Bonnel de Mézières^{(fr)}, and two White Fathers, Augustin Hacquard and François Ménoret. The leadership of the mission had not been well defined, and the members quarrelled. Méry was emotionally unstable and had a violent temper. He shot a guide in the arm during an argument, and killed his interpreter's dog after it refused a command to attack a gazelle. At one point he threatened to blow everyone up with boxes of blasting powder. Méry suffered the relapse from an illness he had contracted earlier in the year, left the expedition and returned to France.

At Toulouse Méry decided to return to the desert once more, at his own expense. He left Toulouse in January 1894 with 1,000 francs, soon used up in purchasing merchandise and provisions for the journey. With a companion named Moulai, from Rhadamès, and two camels he followed the trail of the Attanoux mission which he rejoined at Ain-Taieba. The two explorers fell out again, and Méry was repatriated a second time with the help of the governor of Algeria.

Bernard d'Attanoux found water in Lake Menghough when he visited it in March 1894. This was in a rainy period, and the rains in the preceding weeks had overwhelmed the wadis and turned the plain into a vast swamp. The expedition had to avoid the valley floors and travel with some difficulty by the higher land. Bernard could not approach the lake very closely, and set up his camp a few kilometers to the southwest at the mouth of the Wadi Timatouiet. He reported that the Ighargharen valley with its sand-clay soils seemed to have great potential for agriculture, particularly cereals. Boreholes would be enough to find water from the rains that sometimes fall in several consecutive years.

== Later career ==
Bernard d'Attanoux was made a Knight of the Legion of Honour on 3 January 1895. Later in 1895 the Algerian Arab interpreter Djebari claimed that survivors from the Flatters expedition were still being held prisoner by the Tuaregs at the oasis of Taoua. A committee of African experts was formed to examine these claims. It included Colonel Ludovic de Polignac, who had helped to negotiate the Ghadames treaty of 1862; Jean-Marie Bayol, former Lieutenant-Governor of Dahomey; the explorers Gaston Donnet, Bernard d'Attanoux and Ferdinand de Béhagle; and Paul Bourdarie, secretary-general of the Société africaine de France. From June to November 1896 Bernard d'Attanoux undertook another mission to Morocco.

Antoine Bernard d'Attanoux died in December 1954 at the age of 101.

== Publications ==
- Voyage d'exploration chez les Touareg, Bulletin de la Société de Géographie de Lille, 1895
- J. Bernard d'Attanoux (15 January 1896), "Tripoli et les voies commerciales du Soudan", Annales de Géographie, 5e Année (20), Armand Colin: 193–201, JSTOR 23861200
- Les grandes concessions coloniales en Afrique, 1899
- La Marche et la pratique du tourisme à pied, 1908

== Sources ==
- Antoine Bernard d' Attanoux (1853–1921) (in French), BnF: Bibliothèque nationale de France, archived from the original on 2017-12-16
- Attanoux (1894), "Bulletin Mensuel (7 Mai 1894)", Afrique explorée et civilisée: journal mensuel (in French), J. Sandoz.
- "Bernard-Attanoux : Antoine Casimir Joseph", Léonore (in French)
- Brower, Benjamin Claude (2011), A Desert Named Peace: The Violence of France's Empire in the Algerian Sahara, 1844–1902, Columbia University Press, ISBN 978-0-231-15493-2
- D'Hauterive, Borel (1882), Annuaire de la noblesse de France et des maisons souveraines de l'Europe (in French), Bureau de la publication
- Dubief, Jean (1999-01-01), L'Ajjer, Sahara central (in French), KARTHALA Editions, ISBN 978-2-86537-896-8
- Guénot, S. (1896), "Mort de M. Gaston MÉRY", Revue (in French), Société de géographie de Toulouse
- Kanya-Forstner, A. S. (1994), "French Missions to the Central Sudan in the 1890s: The Role of Algerian Agents and Interpreters", Paideuma: Mitteilungen zur Kulturkunde, 40, The Sokoto Caliphate and the European Powers 1890–1907, Frobenius Institute: 15–35, JSTOR 40341674
- Marbeau, Édouard; Demanche, Georges, eds. (1896), "L'Explorateur Gaston Mery (1844–1896)", Revue francaise de l'etranger et des colonies et Exploration, gazette (in French), Au Secrétariat général de l'Institut de Carthage
- Pierfit, Antoine-Casimir-Joseph BERNARD-ATTANOUX (in French)
- Pottier, René (1947), Histoire du Sahara (in French), Nouvelles Editions Latines, ISBN 978-2-7233-0859-5
