= Alfred Le Chatelier =

French explorer and professor

Frédéric Alfred Le Chatelier
- Born: 23 November 1855
- Died: 9 August 1929 (aged 73)
- Occupations: Soldier, Ceramicist, Islamologist

Frédéric Alfred Le Chatelier (23 November 1855 – 9 August 1929) was a French soldier, ceramicist and Islamologist. He spent most of his military career in the French African colonies. After leaving the army he was involved in a project to build a railway in the French Congo. He fought a duel and killed his opponent over mutual accusations of improper conduct concerning the Congo railways. He founded and ran a ceramics workshop for a few years before becoming a professor of Islamic Sociology at the Collège de France from 1902 to 1925. He exerted considerable influence over French policy towards the Muslim subjects of France's colonial empire, arguing for policy based on solidly documented facts, and for tolerance and sympathy to the rapidly changing Muslim societies.

== Early years (1855–76) ==
Frédéric Alfred Le Chatelier was born on 12 November 1855 in Paris at 84 rue de Vaugirard in the center of a district of art and ceramic studios. He was one of seven children of the prominent railway engineer Louis Le Chatelier (1815–1873) and Louise Madeleine Élisabeth Durand (1827–1902). His family was wealthy and well-connected. His brother was the future chemist Henry Louis Le Chatelier. Although interested in natural sciences, Alfred chose to join the army and attended the École spéciale militaire de Saint-Cyr He obtained his diploma in 1874 and degree in 1876. He was brilliant, visionary, entrepreneurial and domineering, a convinced republican and secularist. He was unable to maintain a long-term friendship.

== Military career (1876–93) ==
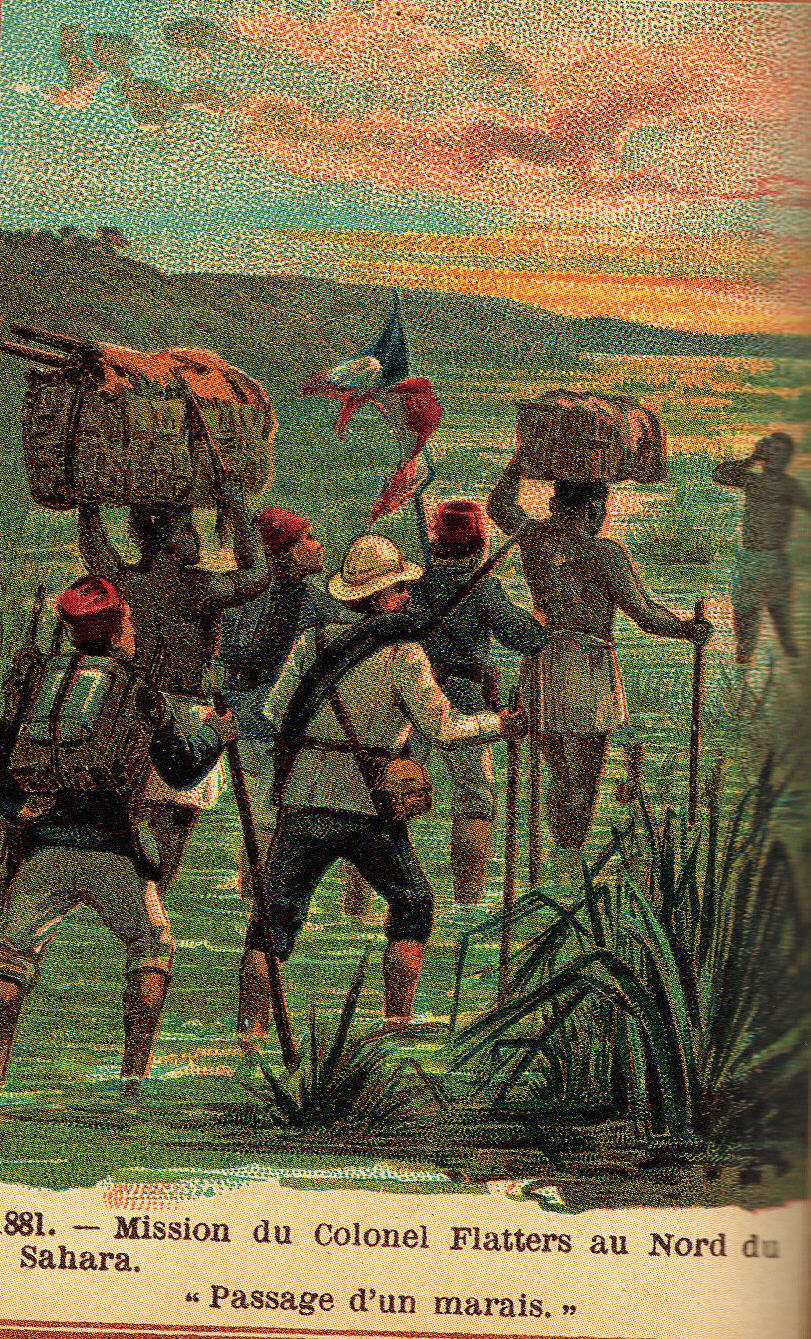
The Flatter expedition crosses a marsh. Lombart Chocolate trading card c. 1900

After leaving Saint-Cyr in 1876 Le Chatelier was an officier des affaires indigénes in Algeria for ten years. In 1880 he was an assistant topographer on the first Flatters expedition. This mission set out in January 1880 to explore a route for a trans-Saharan railway. At Touggourt Le Chatelier advised Paul Flatters not to accept the offer of a muqaddam to accompany the mission, since his religious prestige might undermine the authority of Flatters. This caused a furious response from Flatters, who possibly felt his competence was being questioned. Relations between the French and Arab members of the expedition were uneasy from the start. At Aïn Taïba, eight days south of Ouargla, Le Chatelier tried to retrieve some water skins the cameleers had taken from the French. The Arabs at once cocked their rifles and took position behind a dune, and the French did the same. Flatters temporarily resolved the problem by relieving Le Chatelier of his command. The mission reached Lake Menghough on the fringe of the Tuareg of the Ajjer country, then returned in May 1880. When the second Flatters expedition was being organized later in 1880 Le Chatelier was among the members of the first expedition who asked for other assignments.

Le Chatelier was head of the French post among the Mekhedma tribe of the Sud-Oranais, where he taught them what he called "republican principles". As the rebellion of the Awlad Sidi Shaykh died down, the itinerant marabouts of the Awlad Sidi Shaykh turned to rebuilding their business, demanding donations to their shrine from the peasants, who still thought they had strong influence with God. Le Chatelier succeeded in convincing the local people that they need not pay the tribute. He was promoted to chef de bureau of Ouargla from 1882 to 1885. Colonel André de Saint-Germain taught him the old school Arab Bureaux principles of administration in which the chef de bureau was administrator, advocate and judge of the indigenous people. Le Chatelier opened a school, had wells dug, improved sanitation, established a court and met regularly with the local elders.

Between 1886 and 1890 Le Chatelier served with a regiment in France but was allowed to travel widely in Morocco, West Africa, Egypt and Turkey. In 1886 the governor general of Algeria charged him with a mission in Upper Egypt and in 1889–90 he undertook a five-month mission in Morocco. Le Chatelier wrote several books and brochures for the African section of the État-major général which had great influence on Paul Marty, who would later write at length about Islam in West Africa. Le Chatelier gained deep knowledge of Islamic societies in the Middle East and North Africa, and came to believe that the French fear of Pan-Islamic conspiracies had no foundation.

In 1887 Le Chatelier wrote Les Confréries Musulmanes de Hijaz, a useful and scholarly monograph that showed the importance in Africa of the Sufi brotherhoods. He said they were not organized associations or secret societies, and individuals followed different shaykhs, but all African Muslims saw themselves as either Qadiriyya or Tijaniyyah. He discussed the Sufi origins of the jihads of Futa Tooro, Fouta Djallon and Sokoto. Le Chatelier wrote a complete draft of L'islam dans l'Afrique occidentale in 1888, which was finally published in 1899. The book had the pragmatic goal of studying Islam to inform political action. He believed that systematic research into Islam was essential, rather than periodical reports or personal views. Policy towards Islam should be reserved, tolerant, attentive and active, and should not be overbearing or aggressive.

In 1890–91 Le Chatelier was a member of the Minister of War Charles de Freycinet's cabinet with the mandate of monitoring debates in the Chamber of Deputies. He became the acquaintance or friend of many rising officials and politicians including Eugène Étienne, future head of the parliamentary colonial group, and Paul Révoil, future governor-general of Algeria. Freycinet arranged for Le Chatelier to take a year's leave to study Islam in Africa, and he spent time in Dahomey and the French Congo. He returned to Paris hoping he could convince the government to support the approach to Africans he had proven in Ouargla. He gained no support, and on 14 April 1893 resigned from the army.

== Congo (1893–96) ==
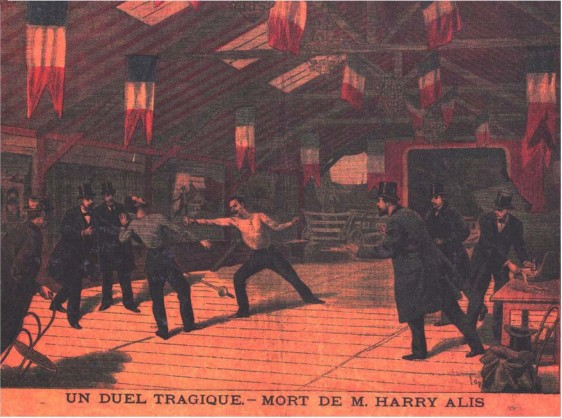
The duel from l'Illustration, 9 March 1895

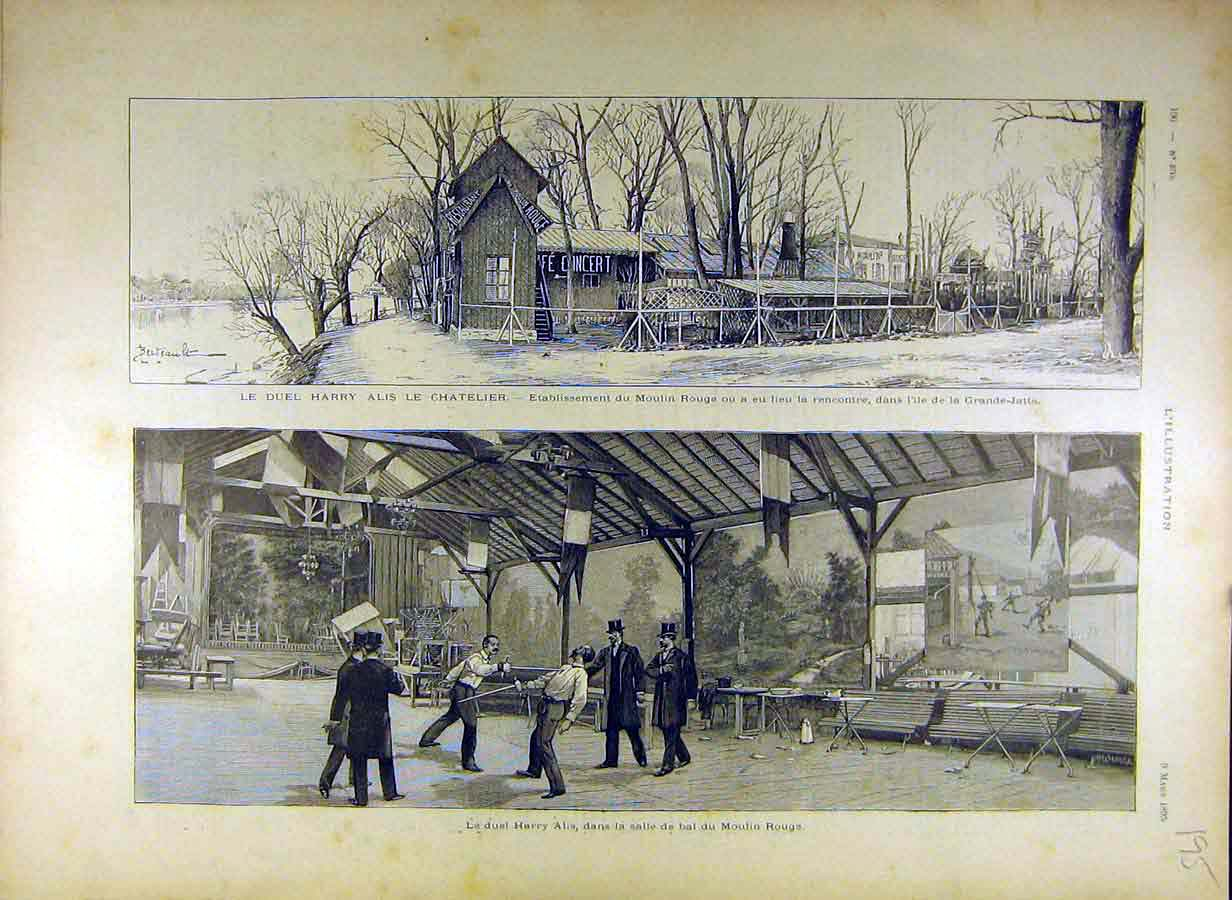
Exterior and interior of the duel location

Le Chatelier was a charter member of the Comité de l'Afrique française, a lobby group that was becoming active in the French Congo. In the Spring of 1893 Le Chatelier founded the Société d'études et d'explorations du Congo français (Company for Study and Exploration of the French Congo) to create a railway link from the coast to the interior. Le Chatelier invested much of his personal fortune in the railway scheme, and suffered great loss when the government came out in favour of a rival project headed by Harry Alis, another founding member of the Comité de l'Afrique française.

On 2 March 1895 Le Chatelier fought a duel at the Moulin Rouge restaurant in Neuilly with Harry Alis (Léon Hippolyte Percher), editor of the Journal des débats. The duel was fought with swords over a charge that Le Châtelier had made that Alis might be compromised with Belgian interests in Africa. Alis had previously accused Le Châtelier of seeking personal gain in the Congo. Colonel Baudot and Commandant de Castelli acted for Chatelier, while Paul Bluysen and André Hallays^{(fr)} of the Journal des débats acted for Percher. The duel proved fatal to Alis. After the duel Le Chatelier lost influence in colonial policy. In June 1895 he returned to the French Congo. His plans were frustrated. The Belgian railway was inaugurated in 1896 and the French work was abandoned. He left the Congo for Paris in March 1896.

== Ceramic workshop (1896–1902) ==
On 5 August 1896 Le Chatelier married Marie Émilie Charlotte Langlois (1858–1930). His wife seems to have had artistic interests, and let him use part of her personal wealth to open the Atelier de Glatigny in the rural area of Glatigny (Le Chesnay), near Versailles. The workshop made stoneware ceramics, high-quality porcelain and glassware. In 1901 the critic Henri Cazalis (alias Jean Lahor), listed the workshop as one of the best producers in France of Art Nouveau ceramics. Le Chatelier's brother, the chemist Henry Louis Le Chatelier, seems to have encouraged Alfred's workshop, assisted with experiments in the composition of porcelain and the reactions of quartz inclusions, and designed a thermoelectric pyrometer to measure temperature in the kilns.

Le Chatelier remained in contact with politics, and provided detailed instructions to the 1898 trans-Sahara expedition organised by Fernand Foureau and Captain François Amédée Lamy, whom he had known before in the French Congo and the Sahara. The well-prepared and well-led expedition was the first French expedition to succeed in crossing the Sahara. In April 1900 Le Chatelier wrote and printed the brochure Lettre à un Algérien sur la politique saharienne, which he sent to leading politicians. The brochure showed the risks of rash action on the Moroccan border and called for a cautious but firm policy. Eugène Étienne and Paul Révoil both supported the brochure, and Le Chatelier was established as a force to be considered in setting North African policy.

== Last years (1902–29) ==
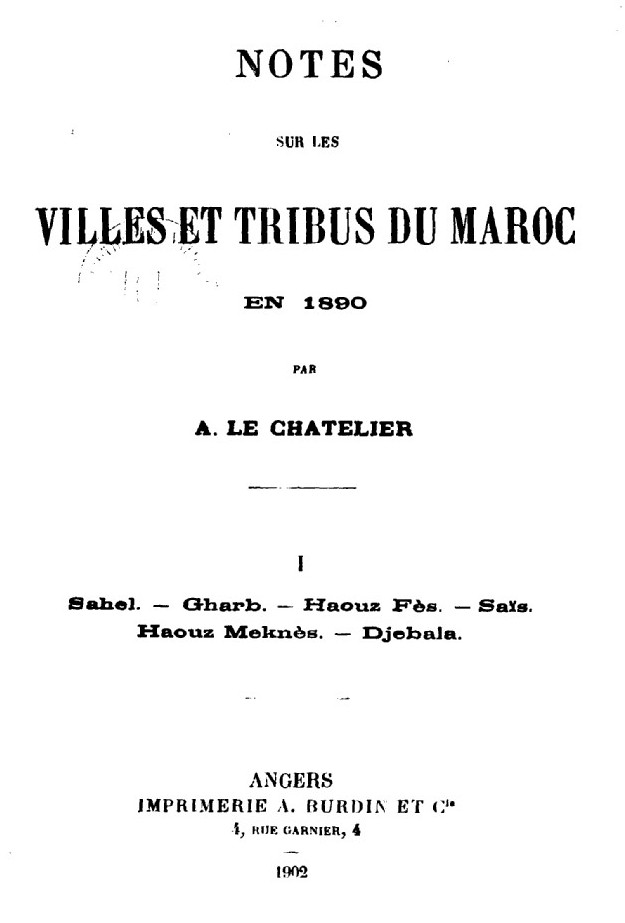
Cover page of Notes sur les villes et tribus du Maroc en 1890 (1902)

The Atelier de Glatigny closed in 1902 when Alfred Le Chatelier was appointed to the chair of Muslim sociology in the Collège de France. The concept of the chair originated in an 1888 proposal by Le Chatelier to establish a central office for Islamic studies and research. This office would act as a clearing house for information on Islam, and would define French policy towards Islamic subjects. The concept was revived early in 1901, and after some resistance the chair was created for La Chatelier in 1902. The choice of name implied that Le Chatelier and his colleagues were engaged in the modern discipline of sociology rather than outdated ethnology.

In 1904 Le Chatelier founded the Mission scientifique du Maroc (Scientific Mission of Morocco) at his own expense, and later received a grant from the Ministry of Education. The Ministry of Foreign Affairs supported the mission in part because a single focus for all research seemed administratively tidy, in part to avoid problems with "unauthorized" explorers in Morocco, and in part in reaction to the aggressive local scholars in Algeria, the "École d'Alger", who advocated direct military intervention rather than peaceful penetration. Le Chatelier played a key part in documenting the ethnic groups of Morocco, and inspired and supervised preparation of the multi-volume Archives marocaines and the Villes et Tribus du Maroc series.

Le Chatelier engaged in an acrimonious struggle with the École d'Alger for control over Moroccan research. Le Chatelier proposed France should control Morocco indirectly through the sultanate. By contrast, Edmond Doutté and the École d'Alger thought France should impose a secular and technocratic state independent of the Islamic leaders. The French resident general Hubert Lyautey combined the approaches, with indirect rule through a sharifian sultanate controlled by the French military technocracy.

In 1906 Le Châtelier launched the Revue du monde musulman (French: Review of the Muslim World). The journal covered contemporary Islamic societies around the world, a group of vital communities with a shared tradition adapting quickly to the new order. In this it was utterly different from conventional studies of Islamic society that treated their subjects as static and outdated. It also differed from other journals in trying to attract Muslim readers, and to this end published translations from Muslim newspapers of Central Asia, India, Persia, the Caucasus, Turkey and the Arab East. Sixty-four issues were published between 1906 and 1926 giving a sensitive, sympathetic and informed view of the crisis that Islam was going through. Contributors included the linguist Lucien Bouvat and the Islamologist Louis Massignon. In its first year the review reached a circulation of 1,200 copies.

Le Chatelier saw two ways in which Muslim societies responded to Western modernization. The more complex societies such as Egypt, Syria and Turkey gradually replaced Islamic faith by nationalism. The more "primitive" Muslims in North Africa turned their back on modern ideas and embraced the mysticism of Sufi brotherhoods. The Revue du monde musulman did not oppose colonialism. Le Chatelier tried to put to rest the fears of colonial officials that some huge pan-Islamic movement would sweep aside their authority, and to assure them that if a realistic, fact-based and sympathetic policy were adopted toward the Muslim subjects of French colonies there need be no unrest. In 1911 Le Chatelier published La conquête du monde Musulman, a survey of Protestant missions in Islamic societies, in the Revue du monde musulman. The article was quickly translated into Arabic and published in many Egyptian newspapers. The Egyptian editor wrote that the way to avoid British dominance was not a program of re-Islamization, but for Muslim gentlemen to stand up to Christian gentlemen.

Le Chatelier was professor at the Collège de France until 1925. He died on 9 August 1929 aged 73.

== Publications ==
Publications by Le Chatelier include:

- Alfred Le Chatelier (1886), Description de l'oasis d'In-Salah, Algiers: P. Fontana, p. 89
- Alfred Le Chatelier (1887), Les confréries musulmanes du Hedjaz, Paris: E. Leroux
- Alfred Le Chatelier (1888), L'Islam au XIXe siècle, Paris: E. Leroux, p. 187
- Alfred Le Chatelier (1888), Les Médaganat, Algiers: A. Jourdan, p. 180
- Alfred Le Chatelier (1890), Questions sahariennes : Touat, Châamba, Touareg, mission dans le sud algérien, juin-août 1890, p. 161
- Alfred Le Chatelier (1891), Tribus du Sud-Ouest marocain : bassins côtiers entre Sous et Drâa, Paris: E. Leroux, p. 89
- Alfred Le Chatelier (1893), Étude et création d'une voie de communication entre la côte et le Congo : voie du Congo français, Paris: impr. de Mouillot, p. 79
- Alfred Le Chatelier (1899), L'islam dans l'Afrique occidentale, Paris: G. Steinheil, p. 376
- Alfred Le Chatelier (1902), Questions d'économie coloniale, lettres à M. Eug. Étienne, vice-président de la Chambre des Députés, par A. Le Chatelier, Paris: A. Challamel, p. 274
- Alfred Le Chatelier (1902), Notes sur les villes et tribus du Maroc en 1890, Angers: impr. de A. Burdin, p. 112
- Alfred Le Chatelier (1911), Réforme républicaine, idées modernes, Paris: E. Leroux, p. 300
- Alfred Le Chatelier (1918), "L'Algérie et l'alfa", Cellulose et papiers, Paris, p. 15

== Sources ==
- Alfred Le Chatelier (1855–1929) (in French), BnF: Bibliotheque nationale de France
- Amster, Ellen J. (2013-08-15), Medicine and the Saints: Science, Islam, and the Colonial Encounter in Morocco, 1877–1956, University of Texas Press, ISBN 978-0-292-75481-2
- Arthur, Paul (2017), "Alfred Le Chatelier et l'Atelier de Glatigny" (PDF), Sèvres (in French) (26), archived from the original (PDF) on 2018-01-16
- Asher, Michael (2011-12-15), Sands of Death: An Epic Tale Of Massacre And Survival In The Sahara, Orion, ISBN 978-1-78022-254-7
- Berner, Ulrich; Bochinger, Christoph (2004), European Traditions in the Study of Religion in Africa, Otto Harrassowitz Verlag, ISBN 978-3-447-05002-9
- Burke, Edmund (2014-09-10), The Ethnographic State: France and the Invention of Moroccan Islam, Univ of California Press, ISBN 978-0-520-27381-8
- Burke, Edmund; Prochaska, David (2008), Genealogies of Orientalism: History, Theory, Politics, U of Nebraska Press, ISBN 978-0-8032-1342-5
- Katz, Jonathan G. (2006-11-16), Murder in Marrakesh: Ã‰mile Mauchamp and the French Colonial Adventure, Indiana University Press, ISBN 0-253-11233-8
- Kramer, Martin (2016-10-31), The War on Error: Israel, Islam, and the Middle East, Transaction Publishers, ISBN 978-1-4128-6448-0
- Ney, Napoleon (1891), "The Proposed Trans-Saharian Railway", Scribner's Magazine, Charles Scribner's Sons
- Pastoureau, Mireille (2008), Le duel fatal Harry Alis – Alfred Le Chatelier, 1er mars 1895, un épisode d'histoire littéraire et coloniale (PDF) (in French), Bibliothèque de l'Institut de France
- Porch, Douglas (2005-06-22), The Conquest of the Sahara: A History, Farrar, Straus and Giroux, ISBN 978-1-4299-2209-8
- Ryad, Umar (2009), Islamic Reformism and Christianity: A Critical Reading of the Works of Muḥammad Rashīd Riḍā and His Associates (1898-1935), BRILL, ISBN 978-90-04-17911-0
- Thimm, Carl A. (1895), "Fatal Sword Duel", A Complete Bibliography of Fencing and Duelling, Pelican Publishing, ISBN 978-1-4556-0277-3
