= Gaston Méry (explorer) =

French explorer and surveyor (c. 1844–1896)

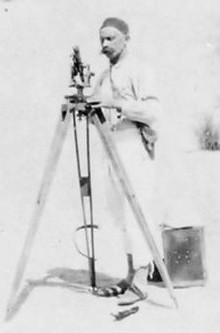
- Méry making astronomical observation in 1893
- Born: c. 1844; Dély Ibrahim, French Algeria
- Died: 18 October 1896 (aged 51–52); Kayes, Mali
- Occupation: Explorer

Gaston Méry (c. 1844 – 18 October 1896) was a French explorer. He was born in French Algeria, son of one of the early settlers. After serving as a sailor and in the army, he assisted in surveys in Tunisia, then undertook three major expeditions into the Sahara in southern Algeria. He established friendly contact with the Tuareg people of the Kel Ajjer confederation, at the time considered unfriendly to the French, and mapped part of the route for a projected trans-Sahara railway to link Algeria to the Sudan. In the last years of his life he became a prosperous trader and real estate developer in Timbuktu.

== Early years (1843–75) ==
Gaston Méry was born in 1843 in Dély Ibrahim, Algiers, Algeria. His family originated in Toulouse. He left home at the age of 16, went to sea and travelled to many parts of the world. When aged 21 he joined the Algerian tirailleurs. He advanced quickly through the lower ranks, and distinguished himself in the Franco-Prussian War of 1870. When he left the army his colonel said "we are losing the worst head and the best heart in the regiment." Méry was tall, active and intelligent, with gray eyes, a high forehead, aquiline nose and wide moustache. He was known for his generosity and improvidence, and was often destitute. He was independent, adventurous and somewhat fatalistic. Like the local people, he was very sober and had great resistance to fatigue.

== Journeys (1876–91) ==
Méry first journeyed in the Sahara with Henri Duveyrier in 1876. In 1884 he assisted Commandant François Élie Roudaire in his hydrographical and topographical work on the chotts in the Gabès region. He then became an employee of the topographical services of Tunisia under M. Piat. In Tunisia he recaptured some of the Arabic that he had already spoken while serving in Algeria. He married for a second time in 1889. In 1890 he was part of the topographical brigade charged with triangulating Tunisia. During his work he became fully familiar with Islam.

Locations in Algeria

In Tunis Méry conceived the project of exploring the Tuareg country beyond the Tunisian border. In 1891 he toured Morocco, Algeria, Tunisia and Tripolitania, preoccupied with organizing commercial links with the Sudan. His chief gave him a letter of recommendation to Georges Rolland, who at once saw his abilities. Rolland was an engineer of the Corps des mines and a strong supporter of the Trans-Saharan railway. Rolland attached Méry permanently to his staff and had him become a member of the Syndicat de Ouargla au Sudan (Oargla to Sudan Company). In 1891 Méry made his first exploration into the Sahara accompanied by some Chaambas, who abandoned him in Tuareg territory without otherwise harming him. He met Tuaregs with whom he established cordial relations.

== 1892 expedition ==
Méry undertook a long expedition in 1892 organized by Georges Rolland and M. Tharel with the purpose of renewing relations with the eastern Tuaregs of the Kel Ajjer confederation. The Tuaregs had made an agreement with Henri Duveyrier (1840–1892), formalized by the Polignac Treaty of Ghademès of 1862, which had been allowed to lapse. On 8 February 1892 Méry left Biskra for El Oued, and on 15 February 1892 left El Oued for the south. On this journey he posed as a date merchant, and travelled with two Chaamba Arab guides and Ali, his personal servant. They took five pack camels, and travelled along the Igharghar valley. They reached the height of Ouargla on 20 February 1892. The travellers lived on dates, bread, well water and coffee, and rarely on a gazelle caught by the large greyhound that accompanied the caravan.

Méry travelled on this expedition for almost 2,000 kilometres (1,200 mi), almost always barefoot to avoid leaving tracks that could be detected by hostile Chaamba. He advanced as far as 27°41'N latitude, 725 kilometres (450 mi) south of Aïn Taïba (Note: Aïn Taïba was known to nineteenth-century explorers as the only water point in the Issaouane Erg (Grande Erg Orientale) dune massif. It was therefore a necessary stopping place. Among others the Aïn Taïba oasis was visited by Fernand Foureau, Ismaël Bou Derba and Paul Flatters. Gallica has copies of photographs taken by the Gaston Méry mission in 1892–93.) and El Biodh in the Igharghar^{(fr)} valley, near to Tebalbalet. This is further on the route from Ouargla to Chad than any European had ventured since Colonel Paul Flatters. On 5 March 1892, having reached Tebelbalet, 86 kilometres (53 mi) SE of El-Biodhand two days past Timassinin, he could go no further because his guides refused to go further into Tuareg territory.

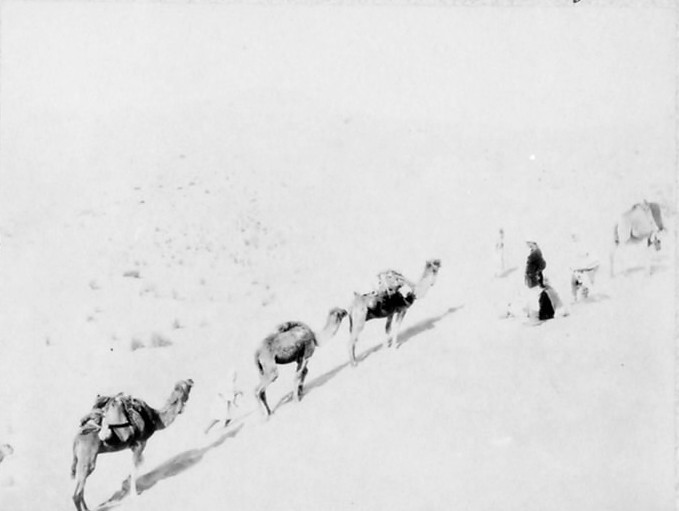
1893 mission - crossing the dunes

Méry turned back, reached El Oued on 1 April and Biskra on 8 April 1892. While passing Aïn Taïba, Mery met Fernand Foureau, who was returning from Hassi-Messeguen, where he recommended establishing a post. Mery agreed with General Philebert, Colonel Polignac and Engineer Rolland that Timassinin was the best site for a post, since it was at the intersection of the southern route from Morocco and the Touat to Triplitania, and the route from the middle Niger to North Africa. His observations confirmed the findings of the first Flatters expedition on construction of a railway from Ouargla to Temassinin. He made topographical surveys using a compass and prepared a 1:625,000 map, altitudes and geological samples. He returned to Toulouse on 17 April 1892.

== 1892–93 expedition ==
In August 1892 Méry returned to Tripoli on a mission of commercial inquiry. The Sudan Syndicate, whose president was Georges Rolland, sponsored the next mission to the Ajjer Tuaregs headed by Gaston Méry. The syndicate's goals were to establish commercial relations with the Tuaregs, and then to extend the Algeria railway from Biskra to Ouargla and across the Sahara towards the Sudan. Méry was to explore the region to the south of Touggourt. He spoke Arabic, and had earlier explored the Argentine Patagonia, so had good qualifications. On 13 December 1892 he left for the south again, well equipped. Méry was accompanied by two Frenchmen, Lacour and Guilloux.

As before, the large escort of Chaamba auxiliaries steadily diminished along the route as they were terrified of the Tuaregs. At the entrance to Gassi-Touil, at Hassi bel-Haïran, they met a group of Tuaregs returning from Algiers. Méry let Lacour, who was in very poor health, return north with some of his Chaambas. One of the Tuaregs, Abd-en-Nebi, was a great-nephew of Othman and remembered Duveyrier and the Treaty of Ghademès well. It was thanks to him that Méry was able to continue to Lake Menghough. On 28 January 1893 Méry and Guilloux reached Aïn-el-Hadjadj in the north-west of the Ighargharen valley, the lower course of the Samene wadi. The escort refused to go further apart from five local Algerians.

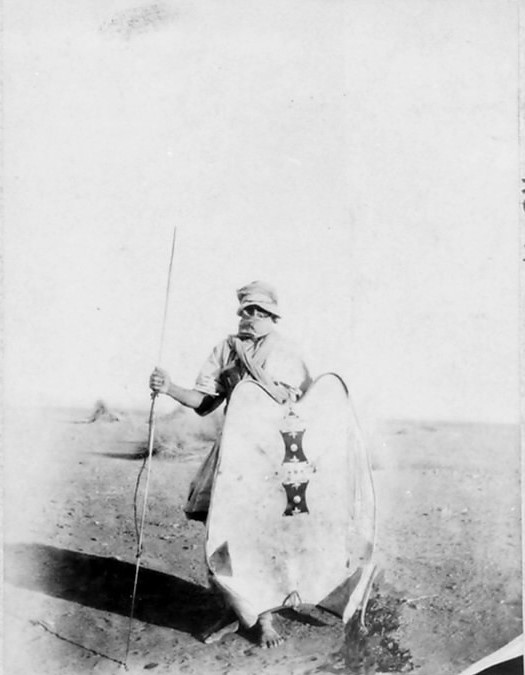
The Amenokal Mouley at Lake Menghough

Despite these defections Méry continued south into the heart of the Tassili of the Hadzger Imogassatem, crossed Ain-Tebalbalet and Ain-El-Hadjadji and eventually reached Lake Menghough. He was the first European to reach the lake since Colonel Flatters. To reach the lake at 27°N latitude, in the heart of the Ajjer Tuareg territory, Flatters had taken a route by El Bioth and Hassi Inifel. Méry took a route further to the east, following the Igharghar valley from Belhelran to Temassinin. He did not find sand dunes, but only a flat and easy desert terrain. For 12 days the caravan had to rely entirely on its own supplies. Along the way the party met many Tuaregs, who assisted and guided him. The Tuaregs allowed him to photograph them.

Méry arrived at Lake Menghough on 15 February 1893, but could not go further due to the poor weather and drought. He was now over 1,200 kilometres (750 mi) from Biskra. When Méry visited Lake Menghough there had been a long period of drought, and it was completely dry. At Lake Menghough Méry met with some of the Kel Ajjer chiefs. He was given a hospitable reception by the chiefs of the confederacy, and particularly by their main chief, the Amenokal Mouley and his nephew Guadassen, from the noble and warlike Ouragben tribe. Méry spent several days with the Tuaregs.

On his return the officers of the Cercle d'El Oued, which in theory included Ajjer, doubted the accuracy of his report. Méry's interests were mainly in commercial opportunities and he was sponsored by the "Société d'Etudes" to build interest in the Biskra to Ouargla railway. Mery had heated discussion with Foureau, who challenged the accuracy of his report. On his return to Paris he was met at the station by a delegation from the Société de géographie, and was later presented to the President of France by the Under-Secretary for the Colonies. Méry reported that the 1867 treaty of Radhamés with Colonel Polignac was still respected by the Tuaregs. He brought back a letter from Amenokal Mouley to the President of France, and some time later this was followed by a delegation of Tuareg notables to the government of Algeria to demand ratification of the conditions of submission and alliance accepted by the Ajjers.

== Attanoux expedition (1893–94) ==
In October 1893 Méry again travelled south with Albert Bonnel de Mézières^{(fr)}, Antoine Bernard d'Attanoux, a former officer who had become editor of Le Temps, and two White Fathers, Augustin Hacquard and François Ménoret. The Attanoux expedition lasted from October 1893 to April 1894. It went south from Biskra past Touggourt and Ouargla, past Aïn Taïba, El Biodh and Temassinin, and along the Ighargharen valley to Lake Menghough. The leadership of the mission had not been well defined, and the members quarrelled. Méry was emotionally unstable and had a violent temper. He shot a guide in the arm during an argument, and killed his interpreter's dog after it refused a command to attack a gazelle. At one point he threatened to blow everyone up with boxes of blasting powder. Méry suffered the relapse from an illness he had contracted earlier in the year, left the expedition and returned to France.

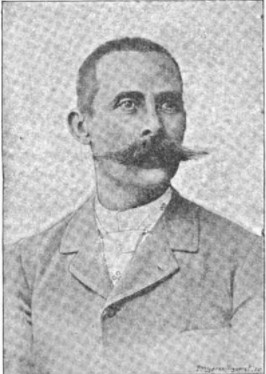
Gaston Méry from his obituary in the Revue tunisienne

At Toulouse Méry decided to return to the desert once more, at his own expense. He left Toulouse in January 1894 with 1,000 francs, soon used up in purchasing merchandise and provisions for the journey. With a companion named Moulai, from Rhadamès, and two camels he followed the trail of the Attanoux mission which he rejoined at Ain-Taieba. The black servant who was his only companion had been closely attached to him for several years. Without instruments, they retraced the path of the previous journey and rejoined the Attanoux mission at Ain Talba. The two explorers fell out again, and Méry was repatriated a second time with the help of the governor of Algeria.

== Timbuktu (1894–96) ==
Soon after this France established a presence in Timbuktu. Méry left Toulouse as an agent of the "Syndicat de Ouargla" to help develop their commercial relations in the Sudan. He travelled to Timbuktu via Senegal, with his servant Moulai. In eight days he had sold all his merchandise, and returned to Kayes, in what is now Western Mali, to obtain more goods. On his return to Timbuktu he began to construct houses, and soon became the main property owner on the city. Méry taught the local people the skills needed for building, and often worked on the jobs himself. He wrote of himself at this time, "I was a mason, stonecutter, carpenter, merchant and even explorer." He contacted the Tuaregs, and contemplated returning from Timbuktu across their country to the north.

In 1895 Méry returned to France, then returned to Timbuktu with his son and a large convoy of merchandise. In 1896, leaving his son and Moulai in Timbuktu, he spent several weeks in France. A message from his son brought him back, and en route to Timbuktu he stopped at Kayes, where he died of an illness on 18 October 1896. Méry was fatalistic, aware of the constant dangers of his way of life, and once said that his preoccupation was more to consume his existence than to conserve it. He left a wife, a daughter of 18 and a son of 23. His son was at Timbuktu, where he continued his father's business.

== Sources ==
- "Aïn Taïba", Bulletin de la Société de Géographie de Marseille (in French), 25, 1900
- Attanoux (1894), "Bulletin Mensuel (7 Mai 1894)", Afrique explorée et civilisée: journal mensuel (in French), J. Sandoz.
- Brower, Benjamin Claude (2011), A Desert Named Peace: The Violence of France's Empire in the Algerian Sahara, 1844–1902, Columbia University Press, ISBN 978-0-231-15493-2
- Camus, G. (1893), 51 phot. de la mission Gaston Méry dans le Sahara algérien, en 1893 (in French), Société de Géographie
- Dubief, Jean (1999-01-01), L'Ajjer, Sahara central (in French), KARTHALA Editions, ISBN 978-2-86537-896-8
- Froidevaux, Henri (15 October 1892), "Chronique Géographique", Annales de Géographie, 2e Année (5), Armand Colin: 118–136, JSTOR 23860036
- Grandjean, Charles, "Flatters", Imago Mundi (in French)
- Guénot, S. (1896), "Mort de M. Gaston MÉRY", Revue (in French), Société de géographie de Toulouse
- Marbeau, Édouard, ed. (1892), "La Mission Gaston Mery au Sahara", Revue francaise de l'etranger et des colonies et Exploration, gazette (in French), Imprimerie et librairie centrales des chemins de fer, imprimerie Chaix
- Marbeau, Édouard; Demanche, Georges, eds. (1896), "L'Explorateur Gaston Mery (1844–1896)", Revue francaise de l'etranger et des colonies et Exploration, gazette (in French), Au Secrétariat général de l'Institut de Carthage
- Ney, Napoleon (1895), "The Tribes of the Sahara", The Cosmopolitan, Schlicht & Field
- Nouvelles géographiques (in French), Librairie Hachette et Cie., 1893
- Pottier, René (1947), Histoire du Sahara (in French), Nouvelles Editions Latines, ISBN 978-2-7233-0859-5
- Société de géographie de Toulouse (1893), "Gaston Méry chez les Touareg", Bulletin (in French)
