= Revue du monde musulman =

Magazine about the Islamic countries in Paris, France (1906–1926)

- Editor: Alfred Le Chatelier; Louis Massignon
- Publisher: Ernest Leroux
- Founder: Mission Scientifique au Maroc
- Founded: 1906
- First issue: November 1906
- Final issue: 1926
- Country: France
- Based in: Paris
- Language: French
- ISSN: 2419-4433
- OCLC: 857933205

Revue du monde musulman (French: Review of the Muslim World) was a French magazine headquartered in Paris, France. The magazine featured articles about the events in the Islamic countries. It existed between 1906 and 1926.

== History and profile ==
Revue du monde musulman was launched in Paris in 1906. The first issue appeared in November that year. The magazine was founded by the Mission Scientifique au Maroc which was established by the French in Tangier. The publisher of Revue du monde musulman was Ernest Leroux. Its editor was Alfred Le Chatelier who was also instrumental in the establishment of Revue du monde musulman. The magazine mostly covered articles on the developments and social and educational situation in the Muslim countries.

The contributors were mainly French scholars who studied Islam, but Muslim authors also contributed to Revue du monde musulman. From 1911 the board of editors included L. Bouvat, Antoine Cabaton, H. Cordier, O. Houdas, Clément Huart, Louis Massignon, J. Vinson and A. Visière. During World War I the magazine was published irregularly, but following the end of the war it began to be published five times per year. In 1919 Louis Massignon replaced Alfred Le Chatelier as the editor.

Revue du monde musulman was in circulation until 1926. Its successor was Revue des études islamiques which was started in 1927.
