= Coutières =

- Part of Les Châteliers
- Location of Coutières
- Location within France Location within Nouvelle-Aquitaine
- Coordinates: 46°30′21″N 0°07′01″W
- Country: France
- Region: Nouvelle-Aquitaine
- Department: Deux-Sèvres
- Arrondissement: Parthenay
- Canton: La Gâtine
- Commune: Les Châteliers
- Area^{1}: 7.32 km^{2} (2.83 sq mi)
- Elevation: 180 m (590 ft)
- Highest elevation: 194 m (636 ft)
- Lowest elevation: 144 m (472 ft)
- Population (2022): 147
  - Density: 20.1/km^{2} (52.0/sq mi)
- Time zone: UTC+01:00 (CET)
  - Summer (DST): UTC+02:00 (CEST)
- Postal code: 79340
- ^{1} French Land Register data, which excludes lakes, ponds, glaciers > 1 km^{2} (0.386 sq mi or 247 acres) and river estuaries.

Coutières (French pronunciation: [kutjɛʁ]) is a former commune in the Deux-Sèvres department in the Nouvelle-Aquitaine region in western France. On 1 January 2019, it was merged into the new commune Les Châteliers.

== See also ==
- Communes of the Deux-Sèvres department
