= Chantecorps =

- Part of Les Châteliers
- Location of Chantecorps
- Location within France Location within Nouvelle-Aquitaine
- Coordinates: 46°29′51″N 0°09′19″W
- Country: France
- Region: Nouvelle-Aquitaine
- Department: Deux-Sèvres
- Arrondissement: Parthenay
- Canton: La Gâtine
- Commune: Les Châteliers
- Area^{1}: 19.1 km^{2} (7.4 sq mi)
- Elevation: 200 m (660 ft)
- Highest elevation: 211 m (692 ft)
- Lowest elevation: 156 m (512 ft)
- Population (2022): 305
  - Density: 16.0/km^{2} (41.4/sq mi)
- Time zone: UTC+01:00 (CET)
  - Summer (DST): UTC+02:00 (CEST)
- Postal code: 79340
- ^{1} French Land Register data, which excludes lakes, ponds, glaciers > 1 km^{2} (0.386 sq mi or 247 acres) and river estuaries.

Chantecorps (French pronunciation: [ʃɑ̃tkɔʁ]) is a former commune in the Deux-Sèvres department in the Nouvelle-Aquitaine region in western France. On 1 January 2019, it was merged into the new commune Les Châteliers.

== See also ==
- Communes of the Deux-Sèvres department
