= Louis Le Chatelier =

French chemist (1815–1873)

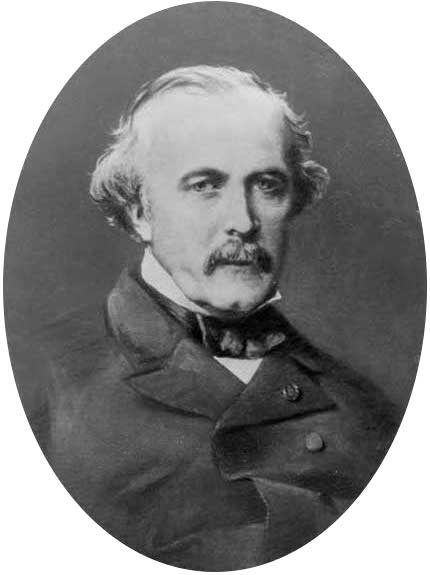
- Born: 20 February 1815; Paris, France
- Died: 10 November 1873 (aged 58); Paris, France
- Scientific career
- Fields: Chemistry

Louis Le Chatelier (20 February 1815 – 10 November 1873) was a French chemist and industrialist who developed a method for producing aluminium from bauxite in 1855. His son was chemist Henry Louis Le Chatelier. His name is inscribed on the Eiffel tower.

Le Chatelier and his wife Louise Madeleine Élisabeth Durand (1827–1902) had seven children. One was Alfred Le Chatelier (1855–1929), who joined the army. Alfred later became a ceramicist and then held the chair of Muslim sociology in the Collège de France for many years.

== Sources ==
- Arthur, Paul (2017), "Alfred Le Chatelier et l'Atelier de Glatigny" (PDF), Sèvres (in French) (26)
