= Albestroff =

- Commune
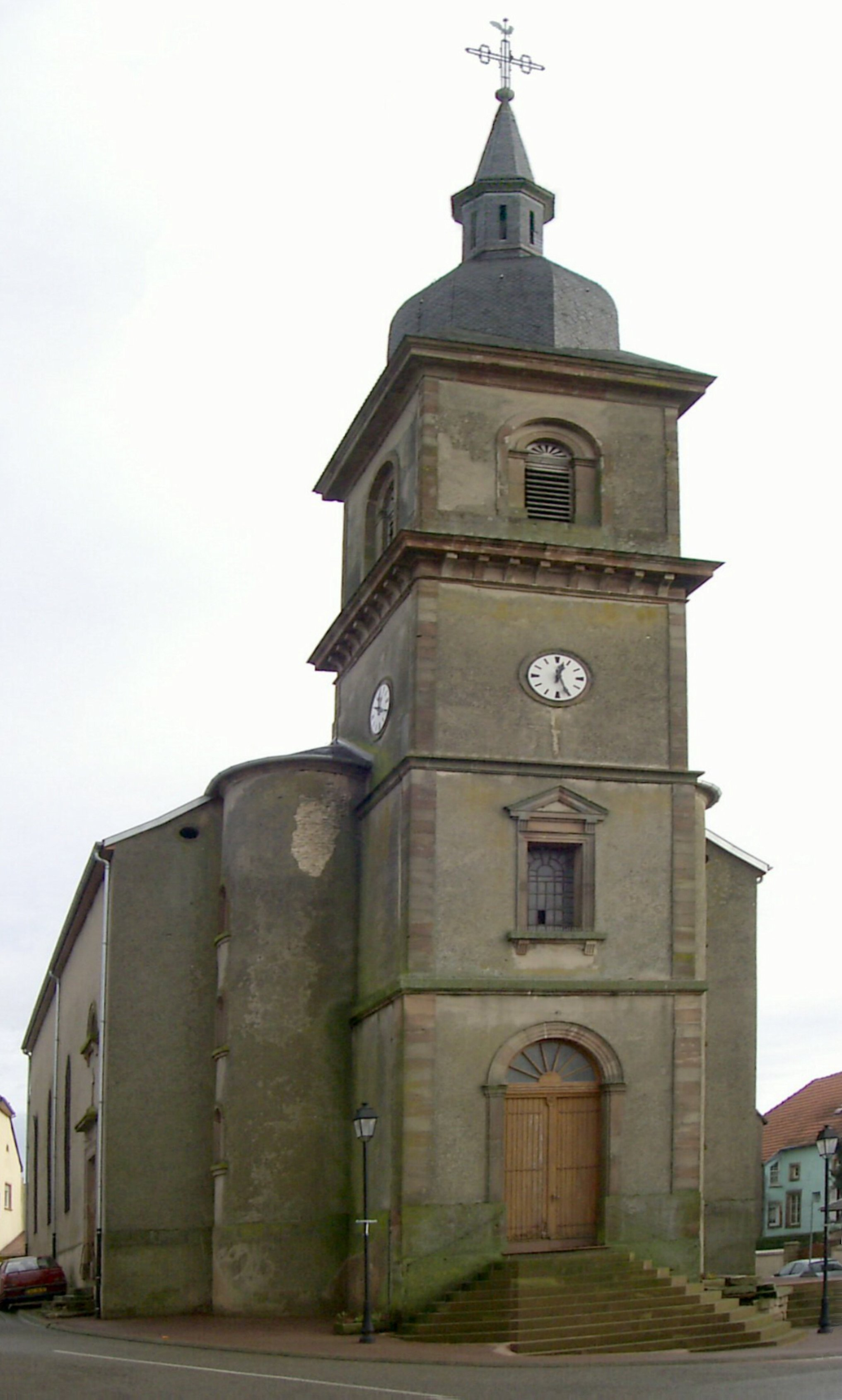
- The church in Albestroff

- Coat of arms
- Location of Albestroff
- Location within France Location within Grand Est
- Coordinates: 48°55′59″N 6°51′26″E
- Country: France
- Region: Grand Est
- Department: Moselle
- Arrondissement: Sarrebourg-Château-Salins
- Canton: Le Saulnois
- Intercommunality: Saulnois

Government
  - Mayor (2020–2026): Germain Mussot
- Area^{1}: 19.3 km^{2} (7.5 sq mi)
- Elevation: 235 m (771 ft)
- Highest elevation: 273 m (896 ft)
- Lowest elevation: 215 m (705 ft)
- Population (2023): 606
  - Density: 31.4/km^{2} (81.3/sq mi)
- Time zone: UTC+01:00 (CET)
  - Summer (DST): UTC+02:00 (CEST)
- INSEE/Postal code: 57011 /57670
- ^{1} French Land Register data, which excludes lakes, ponds, glaciers > 1 km^{2} (0.386 sq mi or 247 acres) and river estuaries.

Albestroff (French pronunciation: [albɛstʁɔf]; German: Albesdorf) is a commune in the Moselle department in Grand Est in northeastern France.

== Geography ==
Albestroff is located between Metz, Nancy and Strasbourg. 20 km from Dieuze, Morhange, Sarre-Union and Sarralbe and 35 km from Sarrebourg, Sarreguemines and Château-Salins.

The municipality is part of the Regional Natural Park of Lorraine.

== Population ==
Historical population
| Year | Pop. | ±% p.a. |
|---|---|---|
| 1968 | 610 | — |
| 1975 | 568 | −1.01% |
| 1982 | 617 | +1.19% |
| 1990 | 651 | +0.67% |
| 1999 | 639 | −0.21% |
| 2007 | 648 | +0.17% |
| 2012 | 640 | −0.25% |
| 2017 | 634 | −0.19% |
| 2023 | 606 | −0.75% |
Source: INSEE

== See also ==
- Communes of the Moselle department
- Parc naturel régional de Lorraine
