= Henry Louis Le Chatelier =

French chemist (1850–1936)

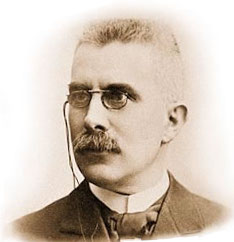
- Born: 8 October 1850; Paris, France
- Died: 17 September 1936 (aged 85); Miribel-les-Échelles, Isère
- Known for: Le Chatelier's principle Thermal flame theory Detonation
- Father: Louis Le Chatelier
- Relatives: Alfred Le Chatelier, brother
- Awards: Davy Medal (1916)
- Scientific career
- Fields: Chemistry
- Workplaces: École Polytechnique; Sorbonne
- Thesis: Recherches expérimentales sur la constitution des ciments hydrauliques (1887)

Henry Louis Le Chatelier (French pronunciation: [ɑ̃ʁi lwi lə ʃɑtəlje]; 8 October 1850 – 17 September 1936) was a French chemist of the late 19th and early 20th centuries. He devised Le Chatelier's principle, used by chemists to predict the effect a changing condition has on a system in chemical equilibrium.

== Early life ==
Le Chatelier was born on 8 October 1850 in Paris and was the son of French materials engineer Louis Le Chatelier and Louise Durand. His father was an influential figure who played important roles in the birth of the French aluminium industry, the introduction of the Martin-Siemens processes into the iron and steel industries, and the rise of railway transportation. Le Chatelier's father profoundly influenced his son's future. Henry Louis had one sister, Marie, and four brothers, Louis (1853–1928), Alfred (1855–1929), George (1857–1935), and André (1861–1929). His mother raised the children by regimen, described by Henry Louis: "I was accustomed to a very strict discipline: it was necessary to wake up on time, to prepare for your duties and lessons, to eat everything on your plate, etc. All my life I maintained respect for order and law. Order is one of the most perfect forms of civilization."

As a child, Le Chatelier attended the Collège Rollin in Paris. At the age of 19, after only one year of instruction in specialized engineering, he followed in his father's footsteps by enrolling in the École Polytechnique on 25 October 1869. Like all the pupils of the Polytechnique, in September 1870, Le Chatelier was named second lieutenant and later took part in the Siege of Paris. After brilliant successes in his technical schooling, he entered the École des Mines in Paris in 1871.

Le Chatelier married Geneviève Nicolas, a friend of the family and sister of four fellow students of the Polytechnique. They had seven children, four girls and three boys, five of whom entered scientific fields; two died preceding Le Chatelier's death.

== Career ==
Despite training as an engineer, and even with his interests in industrial problems, Le Chatelier chose to teach chemistry rather than pursue a career in industry. In 1887, he was appointed head of the general chemistry to the preparatory course of the École des Mines in Paris. He tried unsuccessfully to get a position teaching chemistry at the École polytechnique in 1884 and again in 1897.

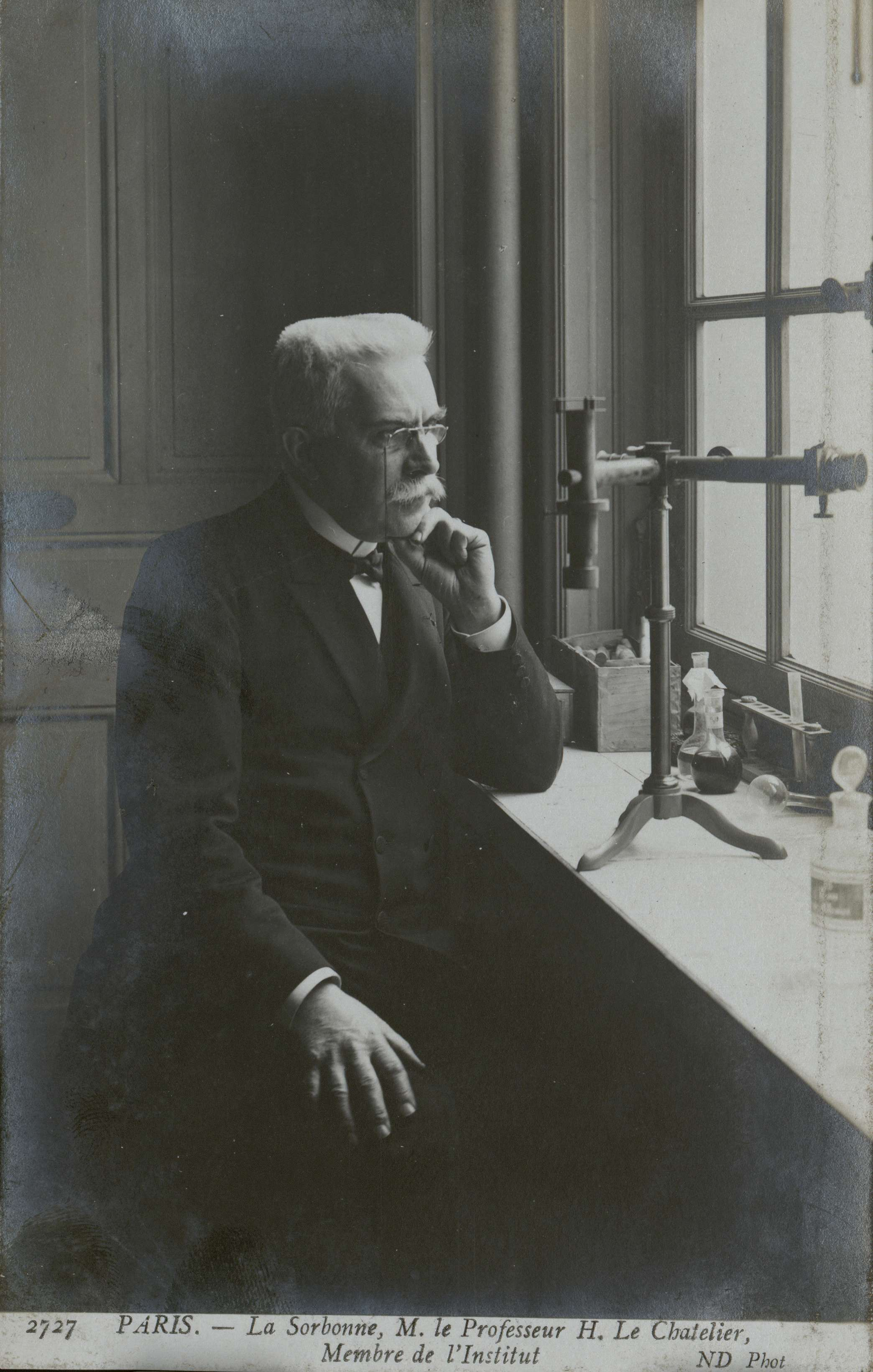
The Sorbonne. Professor Henry Louis Le Chatelier (Bibliothèque de La Sorbonne, NuBIS)

At the Collège de France, Le Chatelier succeeded Schützenberger as chair of inorganic chemistry. Later he taught at the Sorbonne university, where he replaced Henri Moissan.

At the Collège de France, Le Chatelier taught:

- Phenomena of combustion (1898)
- Theory of chemical equilibria, high temperature measurements and phenomena of dissociation (1898–1899)
- Properties of metal alloys (1899–1900)
- Iron alloys (1900–1901)
- General methods of analytical chemistry (1901–1902)
- General laws of analytical chemistry (1901–1902)
- General laws of chemical mechanics (1903)
- Silica and its compounds (1905–1906)
- Some practical applications of the fundamental principles of chemistry (1906–1907)
- Properties of metals and some alloys (1907)

After four unsuccessful campaigns (1884, 1897, 1898 and 1900), Le Chatelier was elected to the Académie des sciences (Academy of Science) in 1907. He was also elected to the Royal Swedish Academy of Sciences in 1907. In 1924, he became an Honorary Member of the Polish Chemical Society.

== Scientific work ==
In chemistry, Le Chatelier is best known for his work on his principle of chemical equilibrium, Le Chatelier's principle, and on varying solubility of salts in an ideal solution. He published no fewer than thirty papers on these topics between 1884 and 1914. His results on chemical equilibrium were presented in 1884 at the Académie des sciences in Paris.

Le Chatelier also carried out extensive research on metallurgy and was one of the founders of the technical newspaper La revue de métallurgie (Metallurgy Review).

Part of Le Chatelier's work was devoted to industry. For example, he was a consulting engineer for a cement company, the Société des chaux et ciments Pavin de Lafarge, today known as Lafarge Cement. His 1887 doctoral thesis was dedicated to the subject of mortars: Recherches expérimentales sur la constitution des mortiers hydrauliques (Experimental Research on the Composition of Hydraulic Mortars).

On the advice of a paper of Le Chatelier that the combustion of a mixture of oxygen and acetylene in equal parts rendered a flame of more than 3000 celsius, in 1899 Charles Picard (1872-1957) started to investigate this phenomenon but failed because of soot deposits. In 1901 the latter consulted with Edmond Fouché and together they obtain a perfectly stable flame and the oxyacetylene industry was born. In 1902 Fouché invented a gas welder tool with French patent number 325,403 and in 1910 Picard developed the needle valve.

Le Chatelier in 1901 attempted the direct combination of the two gases nitrogen and hydrogen at a pressure of 200 atm and 600 °C in the presence of metallic iron. An air compressor forced the mixture of gases into a steel Berthelot bomb, where a platinum spiral heated them and the reduced iron catalyst. A terrific explosion occurred which nearly killed an assistant. Le Chatelier found that the explosion was due to the presence of air in the apparatus used. And thus it was left for Fritz Haber to succeed where several noted French chemists, including Thenard, Sainte Claire Deville and even Berthelot had failed. Less than five years later, Haber and Carl Bosch were successful in producing ammonia on a commercial scale. Near the end of his life, Le Chatelier wrote, "I let the discovery of the ammonia synthesis slip through my hands. It was the greatest blunder of my scientific career”.

His brother Alfred Le Chatelier, a former soldier, opened the Atelier de Glatigny in the rural area of Glatigny (Le Chesnay), near Versailles, in 1897. The workshop made sandstone ceramics, high-quality porcelain and glassware. In 1901, the critic Henri Cazalis (alias Jean Lahor), listed the workshop as one of the best producers in France of Art Nouveau ceramics. Henry Louis seems to have encouraged Alfred's workshop and assisted with experiments in the composition of porcelain and the reactions of quartz inclusions, and also designed a thermoelectric pyrometer to measure temperature in the kilns.

=== Le Chatelier's principle ===
Le Chatelier's Principle states that a system always acts to oppose changes in chemical equilibrium; to restore equilibrium, the system will favor a chemical pathway to reduce or eliminate the disturbance so as to restabilize at thermodynamic equilibrium. Put another way,

If a chemical system at equilibrium experiences a change in concentration, temperature or total pressure, the equilibrium will shift in order to minimize that change.

This qualitative law enables one to envision the displacement of equilibrium of a chemical reaction.

For example: a change in concentration of a reaction in equilibrium for the following equation:

N_{2}(g) + 3H_{2}(g) ⇌ 2NH_{3}(g)

If one increases the pressure of the reactants, the reaction will tend to move towards the products to decrease the pressure of the reaction.

However consider another example: in the contact process for the production of sulfuric acid, the second stage is a reversible reaction:

2SO_{2}(g) + O_{2}(g) ⇌ 2SO_{3}(g)

The forward reaction is exothermic and the reverse reaction is endothermic. Viewed by Le Chatelier's principle a larger amount of thermal energy in the system would favor the endothermic reverse reaction, as this would absorb the increased energy; in other words the equilibrium would shift to the reactants in order to remove the stress of added heat. For similar reasons, lower temperatures would favor the exothermic forward reaction, and produce more products. This works in this case, since due to loss of entropy the reaction becomes less exothermic as temperature increases; however reactions that become more exothermic as temperature increases would seem to violate this principle.

== Politics ==
It was then typical for scientists and engineers to have a very scientific vision of industry. In the first issue of La revue de métallurgie, Le Chatelier published an article describing his convictions on the subject, discussing the scientific management theory of Frederick Winslow Taylor. In 1928, he published a book on Taylorism.

Le Chatelier was politically conservative. In 1934, he published an opinion on the French forty-hour work week law in the Brussels publication Revue économique internationale. However, in spite of certain anti-parliamentarian convictions, he kept away from any extremist or radical movements.

== Works ==
- Cours de chimie industrielle (1896; second edition, 1902)
- High Temperature Measurements, translated by G. K. Burgess (1901; second edition, 1902)
- Recherches expérimentales sur la constitution des mortiers hydrauliques (1904; English translation, 1905)
- Leçons sur le carbone (1908)
- Introduction à l'étude de la métallurgie (1912)
- La silice et les silicates (1914)

== Honours and awards ==
Le Chatelier named "chevalier" (knight) of the Légion d'honneur in 1887, became "officier" (officer) in 1908, "commandeur" (Knight Commander) in 1919, and was finally awarded the title of "grand officier" (Knight Grand Officer) in May 1927. He was admitted to the Académie des Sciences in 1907.

He was awarded the Bessemer Gold Medal of the British Iron and Steel Institute in 1911, admitted as a Foreign Member of the Royal Society in 1913 and awarded their Davy Medal in 1916. He was elected an honorary member of the American Society of Mechanical Engineers in 1927.

== Sources ==
- Arthur, Paul (2017), "Alfred Le Chatelier et l'Atelier de Glatigny" (PDF), Sèvres (in French) (26), archived from the original (PDF) on 2018-01-16
