= Les Châteliers =

- Commune
- Location of Les Châteliers
- Location within France Location within Nouvelle-Aquitaine
- Coordinates: 46°30′21″N 0°07′01″W
- Country: France
- Region: Nouvelle-Aquitaine
- Department: Deux-Sèvres
- Arrondissement: Parthenay
- Canton: La Gâtine
- Intercommunality: CC Parthenay-Gâtine

Government
  - Mayor (2020–2026): Nicolas Gamache
- Area^{1}: 26.42 km^{2} (10.20 sq mi)
- Highest elevation: 211 m (692 ft)
- Lowest elevation: 144 m (472 ft)
- Population (2023): 445
  - Density: 16.8/km^{2} (43.6/sq mi)
- Time zone: UTC+01:00 (CET)
  - Summer (DST): UTC+02:00 (CEST)
- INSEE/Postal code: 79105 /79340
- ^{1} French Land Register data, which excludes lakes, ponds, glaciers > 1 km^{2} (0.386 sq mi or 247 acres) and river estuaries.

Les Châteliers (French pronunciation: [le ʃatəlje]) is a commune in the Deux-Sèvres department in the Nouvelle-Aquitaine region in western France. It was established on 1 January 2019 by merger of the former communes of Coutières (the seat) and Chantecorps.

== See also ==
- Communes of the Deux-Sèvres department
