= Lisbourg =

Lisbourg Liegesboort
- Commune
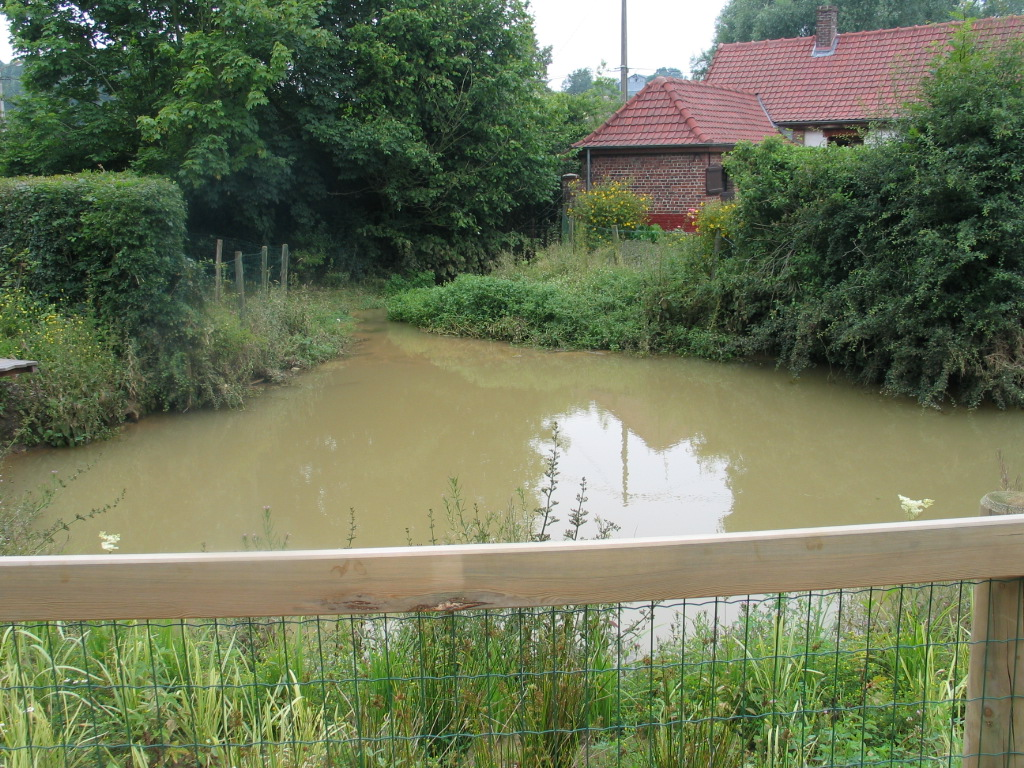
- Lys header pool

- Coat of arms
- Location of Lisbourg
- Location within France Location within Hauts-de-France
- Coordinates: 50°30′27″N 2°13′04″E
- Country: France
- Region: Hauts-de-France
- Department: Pas-de-Calais
- Arrondissement: Arras
- Canton: Saint-Pol-sur-Ternoise
- Intercommunality: CC Ternois

Government
  - Mayor (2021–2026): Willy Gallet
- Area^{1}: 17.77 km^{2} (6.86 sq mi)
- Elevation: 116 m (381 ft)
- Highest elevation: 184 m (604 ft)
- Lowest elevation: 103 m (338 ft)
- Population (2023): 582
  - Density: 32.8/km^{2} (84.8/sq mi)
- Time zone: UTC+01:00 (CET)
  - Summer (DST): UTC+02:00 (CEST)
- INSEE/Postal code: 62519 /62134
- ^{1} French Land Register data, which excludes lakes, ponds, glaciers > 1 km^{2} (0.386 sq mi or 247 acres) and river estuaries.

Lisbourg (French pronunciation: [lisbuʁ]; West Flemish: Liegesboort) is a commune in Pas-de-Calais, Hauts-de-France, France.

== Geography ==
Lisbourg is located at the source of Lys, which flows northwards to Belgium and the Scheldt estuary.

== History ==
The knight, Vollant de Berneville acquired the estate of Lisbourg in 1692 and was promoted to Marquise in 1694. His family ran the estate up until the French Revolution and were the last Lords of Lisbourg.

== Population ==
Historical population
Year	Pop.	±% p.a.
1968	656	—
1975	678	+0.47%
1982	706	+0.58%
1990	655	−0.93%
1999	587	−1.21%
2007	563	−0.52%
2012	571	+0.28%
2017	591	+0.69%
2023	582	−0.26%
Source: INSEE

== Places of interest ==
- The remains of the castle
- The War Memorial, in the graveyard of the church, commemorating the 44 that died for France in two world wars

== See also ==
- Communes of the Pas-de-Calais department
