= Aïn Taïba =

Oasis and pit cave in Ouargla Province, Algeria

- Location in Algeria
- Coordinates: 30.276654°N 5.819271°E
- Country: Algeria
- Province: Ouargla Province
- District: Ouargla District
- Elevation: 321 m (1,053 ft)

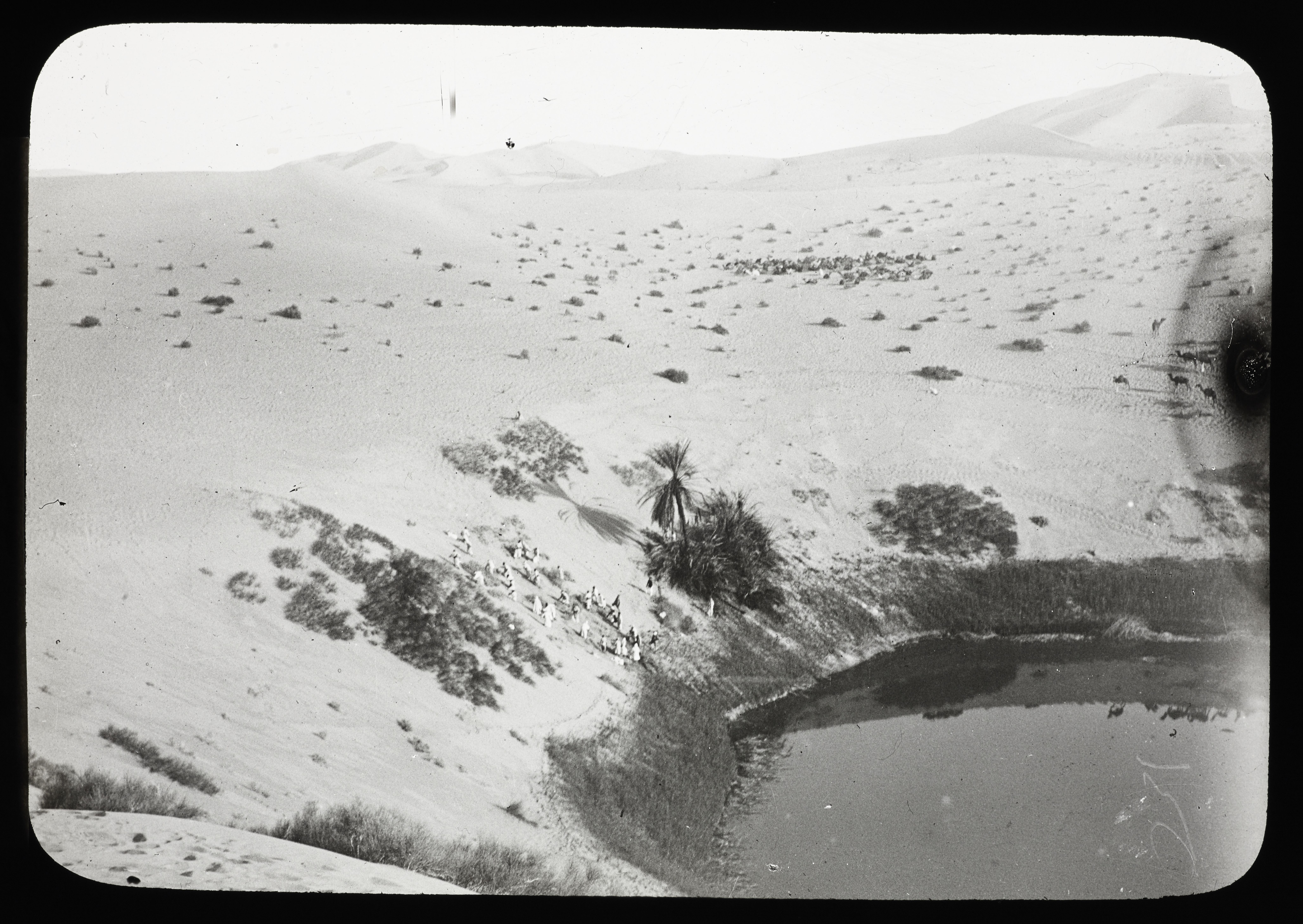
Sahara Expedition to Aïn-Taïba, extracting a camel that had fallen into the water, November 1, 1898

'Aïn Taïba (or Hassi Taïba) is an oasis and pit cave in Algeria.

== Location ==
Aïn Taïba is about 190 kilometres (120 mi) south of Ouargla and about 250 kilometres (160 mi) north of Bordj Omar Driss, in the middle of the desert. It is 231 metres (758 ft) above sea level. It is a water hole with a perimeter of about 100 metres (330 ft).

== History ==
Aïn Taïba was known to nineteenth-century explorers as the only water source in the Issaouane Erg (Grande Erg Orientale) dune massif. It was therefore a necessary stopping place. Among others the oasis was visited by Fernand Foureau, Ismaël Bou Derba, Paul Flatters and Gaston Méry. (Note: Gallica has copies of the photographs taken by Gaston Méry in 1892.)

== Sources ==
- Gaston Méry, 14 phot. de la Mission Gaston Méry dans le Sahara algérien en 1892-1893. Enregistré en 1931 (in French), Société de Géographie – via Gallica
- "Aïn Taïba", Bulletin de la Société de Géographie de Marseille (in French), 25, 1900
- Dubief, Jean (1999), L'Ajjer, Sahara central (in French)
- Grandjean, Charles, "Flatters", Imago Mundi (in French)
