= Lake Menghough =

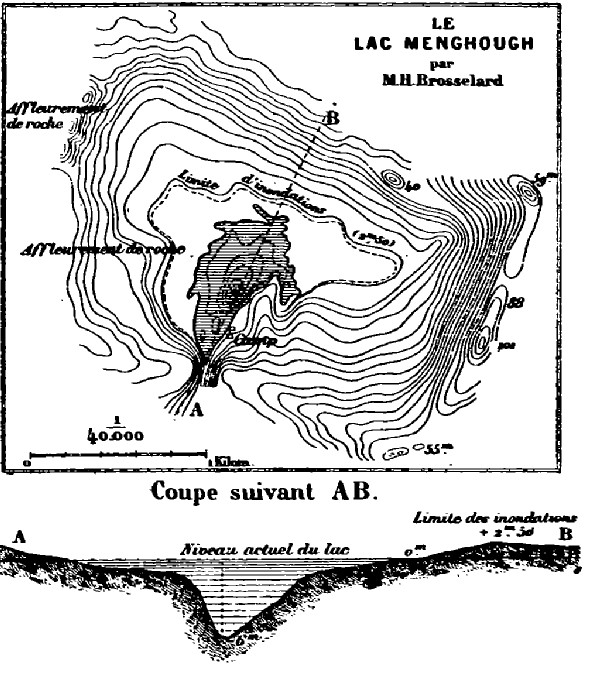
- Map and cross-section by Henri Brosselard-Faidherbe

- Location within Algeria
- Coordinates: 26.45°N 8.16°E
- Type: Lake
- Basin countries: Algeria

Lake Menghough was an intermittent lake in the southeast of Algeria. It is described in the account of the first Flatters expedition, which reached the lake in April 1880. Other European visitors found the lake dry or filled depending on rainfall.

== Location ==
The lake was to the north of the Tassili n'Ajjer mountain range and is about 35 kilometres west of Illizi. Flatter's expedition moved southwards from Temassinin (today Bordj Omar Driss) and soon followed the plain between the dune area of Erg Issaouane and the Tassili n'Ajjer mountains to the southeast. This valley was then called Oued Ighargharen (today: Oued Irarraren). They reached the Mennkhour dune area, where they were led to the hidden lake. This dune region also gave the lake its name. Lake Menghough was surrounded by dunes about 50 meters high, with a cut towards the southwest. The water that fed the lake after rainfall must have entered the lake from the south through the sand, as the lake bottom was a few meters lower than the valley floor. The nearby Oued Tadjeradjeri, which flows into the plain from the south, has a very large catchment area and can therefore carry a lot of water and flood the plain.

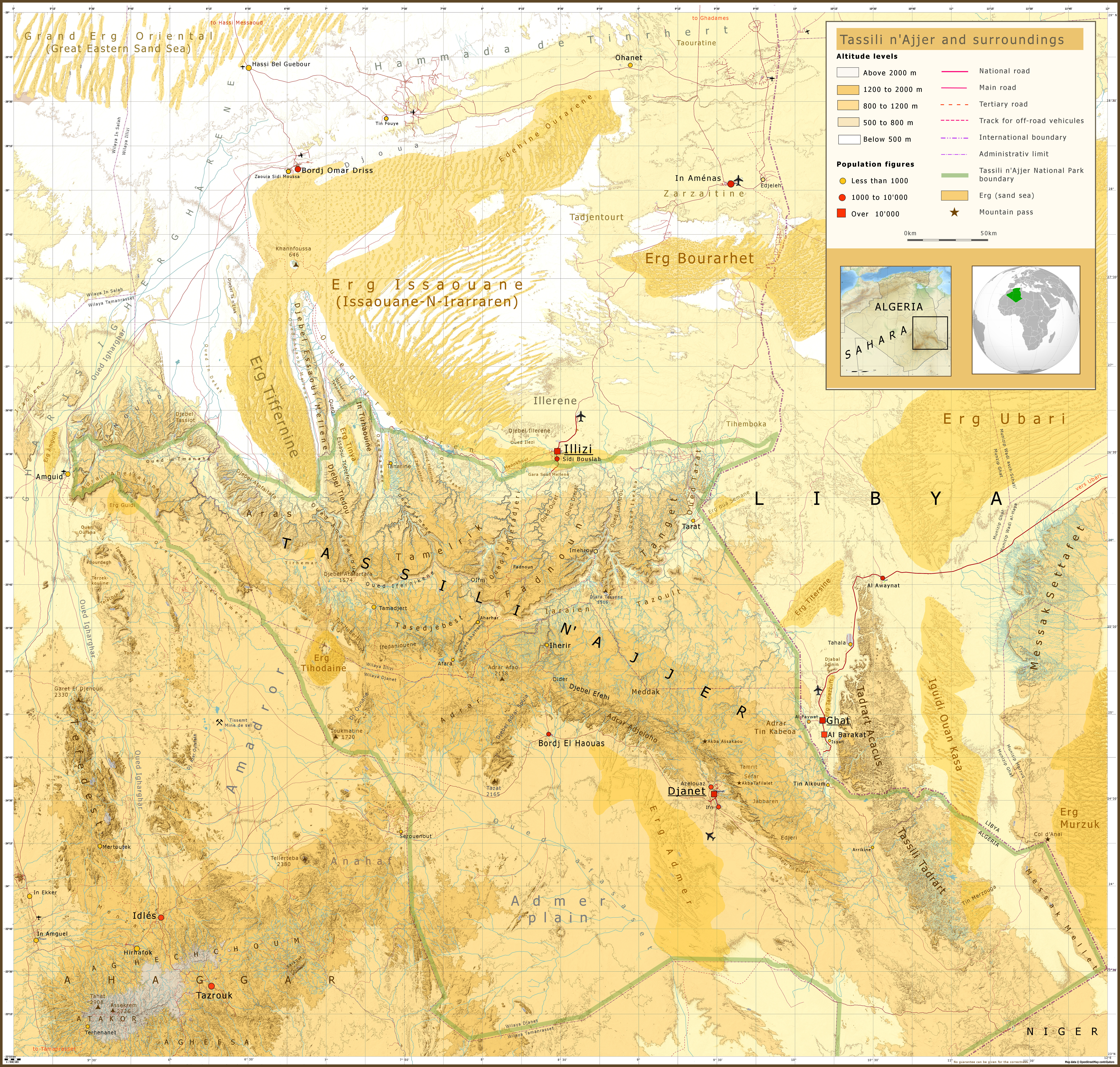
Tassili n'Ajjer with surroundings, Mennkhour is west of Illizi

== Flatters expedition ==
The first Flatters expedition left Biskra early in February 1880 and travelled south by Touggourt, Ouargla, Aïn-el-Taïba and Temassinin. The expedition encamped on shores of Lake Menghough on 16 April 1880. At this time the lake was about 1,100 by 100 yards (1,006 by 91 m), with creeks fringed by tamarisk and flowering plants on its southern side. The other shores were low and clayey. They found yellow-eyed Clarias lazera (African sharptooth catfish) in the lake. The expedition members swam in the lake, and caught five fish, the longest of which was 2 feet (0.61 m) long. Near Lake Menghough in the Ighargharen valley the expedition found two double stone tombs surrounded by a circular wall about 9 metres (30 ft) in diameter, with a gap in the wall towards the east. The Tuaregs could not supply any information about the tombs. With provisions running short and the local people showing hostility, Flatters decided to return by the same route.

A member of the Flatters expedition reported that:

The water was sweet, but slightly brackish at the western part, where the deposits brought down by the Tijoujelt form shallows, on which the saline ingredients of the water are concentrated by the action of the sun. A small island in it was frequented by snipe, herons, and other semi-aquatic birds; and many fish were observed in its waters, including Clarias lazera, Cuv. and Val., a Nile species found elsewhere in the Tuareg region by Duveyrier. After some difficulty, the bottom of the lake was reached and measured; soon after leaving the banks, the sides reached 13 to 16 feet, and towards the middle narrow transverse, fissures 25 feet in depth were found. This latter circumstance, added to the fact of the temperature rapidly diminishing from the sides, and the assurance of the Tuaregs that the lake was never dry, though of varying size according to season, led the author to the conclusion that there is a permanent source of supply; otherwise it would probably be classed with the neighbouring temporary lakes (Saghen) found north of Tajenout, on Duveyrier's route from Ghadames to Rhat.

== Later expeditions ==
The French explorer Gaston Méry visited the lake in 1893 after a long period of drought, and found it completely dry. Méry was the first French explorer to visit the region since the massacre of the second Flatters expedition. He and Guilloux were accompanied by five local Algerians. At Lake Menghough Méry met with some of the Kel Ajjer chiefs.

Antoine Bernard d'Attanoux found water in the lake when he visited it in March 1894. This was in a rainy period, and the rains in the preceding weeks had overwhelmed the wadis and turned the plain into a vast swamp. The expedition had to avoid the valley floors and travel with some difficulty by the higher land. Attanoux could not approach the lake very closely, and set up his camp a few kilometers to the southwest at the mouth of the Wadi Timatouiet. Attanoux noted that Colonel Flatters had thought the lake was fed by an underground source, and that this was plausible despite the lake drying up, since there was no permanent water table in the region and the source could therefore have dried up. He reported that the Ighargharen valley with its sand-clay soils seemed to have great potential for agriculture, particularly cereals. Boreholes would be enough to find water from the rains that sometimes fall in several consecutive years. However, the nomadic Tuaregs did not practice agriculture.

== Sources ==
- Asher, Michael (2008-05-17), Death in the Sahara: The Lords of the Desert and the Timbuktu Railway Expedition Massacre, Skyhorse Publishing, ISBN 978-1-5107-2016-9
- Attanoux (1894), "Bulletin Mensuel (7 Mai 1894)", Afrique explorée et civilisée: journal mensuel (in French), J. Sandoz.
- Grandjean, Charles, "Flatters", Imago Mundi (in French)
- Lanier, Lucien (1887), Choix de lectures de géographie (in French), Belin
- Nouvelles géographiques (in French), Librairie Hachette et Cie., 1893
- Porch, Douglas (2005-06-22), The Conquest of the Sahara: A History, Farrar, Straus and Giroux, ISBN 978-1-4299-2209-8
- Royal Geographical Society (1881), Proceedings of the Royal Geographical Society and Monthly Record of Geography, Edward Stanford
- Revue Archeologique (1885), The American Journal of Archaeology and of the History of the Fine Arts, Ginn
- Wahl, Maurice (1896), "La France au Sahara", La France aux colonies (PDF) (in French), Paris: Ancienne Maison Quantin
- Brosselard, Henri, "Les deux missions Flatters au pays des Touareg Azdjer et Hoggar", Jouvet (Paris), 1889 (in French)
- "Carte d'une partie du Sahara central, avec l'itinéraire des missions du Lt-colonel Flatters", BnF Gallica 1882 / 2011
