= Henri Brosselard-Faidherbe =

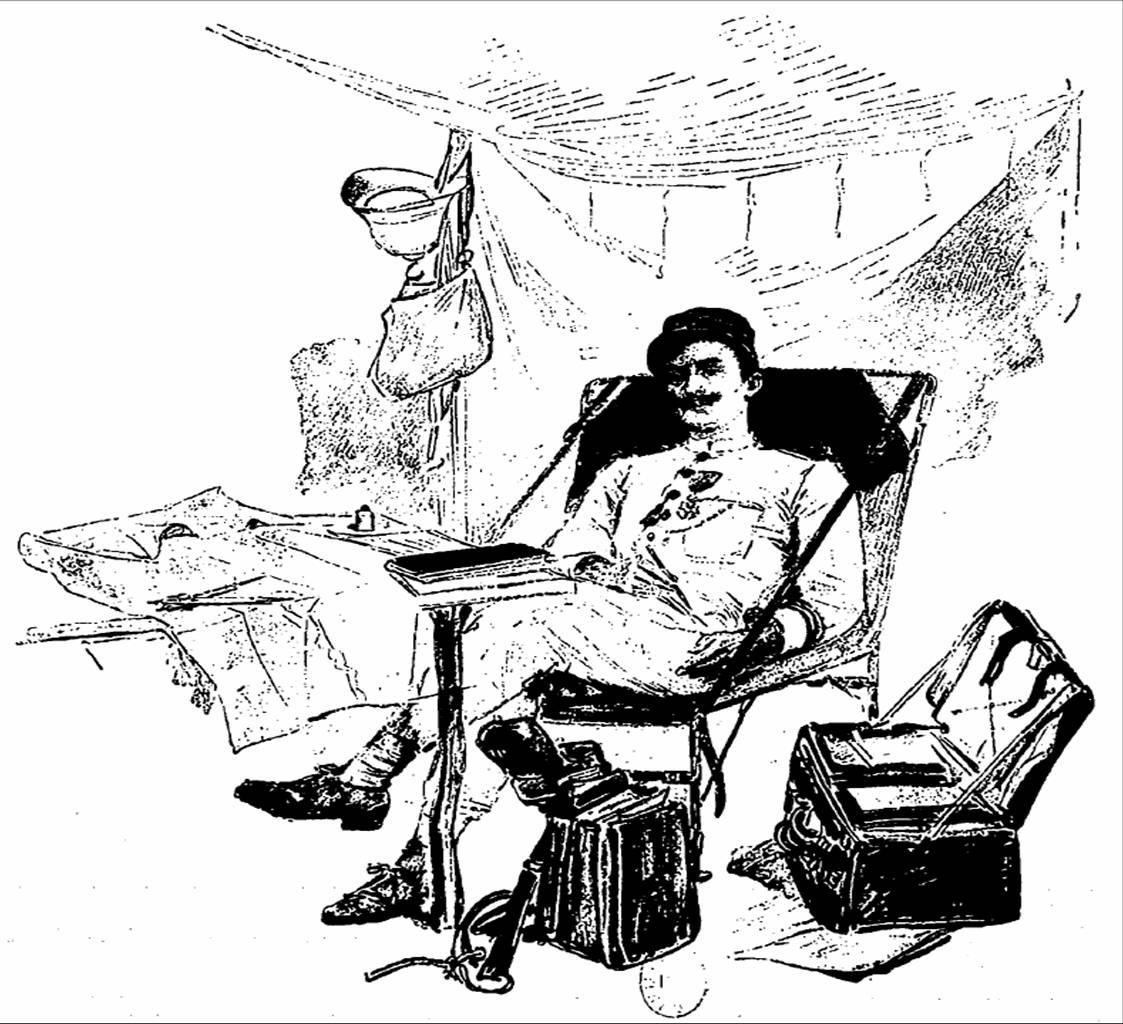
Portrait in Casamance et Mellacorée (1892)

Henri Brosselard-Faidherbe (1855–1893) was a French military officer and explorer.

== Biography ==
Henri François Brosselard was born on 3 June 1855. On 30 October 1883 he married Mathilde-Marie Faidherbe, the daughter of General Louis Faidherbe. He was permitted to attach the surname of his father-in-law to his own. Brosselard was a member of the first expedition of Colonel Paul Flatters to explore a possible route for a Trans-Saharan railway. Later he wrote a book on this and the second expedition, which ended in disaster. He died on 19 August 1893 in Coutances, Manche at the age of 38.

== Works ==
- Les deux missions du Colonel Flatters en Afrique : récit historique et critique par un membre de la première mission, Paris, Dreyfous, 1884
- Rapport sur la situation dans la vallée du Sénégal en 1886 : insurrection de Mahmadou-Lamine, 1888
- La Guinée portugaise et les possessions françaises voisines, Lille, 1889, 116 p.
- Les deux missions Flatters au pays des Touareg Azdjer et Hoggar, Paris, Jouvet, 1889, 304 p.
- Rivières du Sud, Paris, Sous-secrétariat d'État des colonies, Imprimerie des Journaux officiels, 1891
- Casamance et Mellacorée. Pénétration au Soudan, Paris, Librairie illustrée, 1892, 106 p. (original text )

== Honors and awards ==
Knight of the Order of Legion of Honour

== See also ==
- Casamance
- History of Guinea-Bissau
- History of Senegal
- Tuareg
