= Paul Flatters =

French soldier (1832-1881)

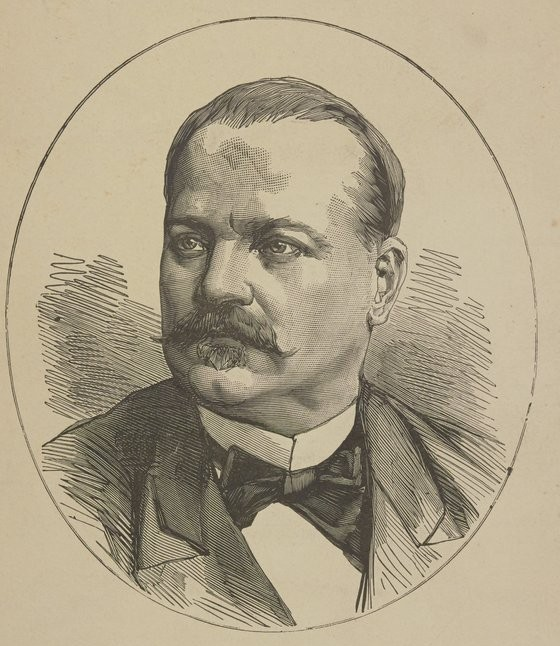
- Flatters around 1880
- Born: Paul-François-Xavier Flatters; 16 September 1832; Paris, France
- Died: 16 February 1881 (aged 48); Bir el-Garama, French Algeria
- Occupation: Soldier

Paul Flatters (16 September 1832 – 16 February 1881) was a French soldier who spent a long period as a military administrator in Algeria. He is known as leader of the Flatters expedition, an ill-fated attempt to explore the route of a proposed Trans-Saharan railway from Algeria to the Sudan. Almost all members of the expedition were massacred by hostile Tuaregs. The survivors resorted to eating grass and to cannibalism on the long retreat through the desert. After a brief outburst of public indignation the fiasco was forgotten.

== Background and early years (1832–53) ==
Paul-François-Xavier Flatters was the son of Jean-Jacques Flatters (1786–1845) and Émilie-Dircée Lebon. His father came from Westphalia to Paris to study sculpture and painting. He was a student of Jean-Antoine Houdon and Jacques-Louis David, and was second in the Prix de Rome for sculpture in 1813. He served in the French army from February to July 1814 at the close of the First French Empire. During the Bourbon Restoration Jean-Jacques Flatters earned a living by making busts of famous people such as Goethe and Byron. Paul Flatters' maternal grandfather, Simon Lebon, joined the National Guard in 1792 during the French Revolution and served in the army until retiring as a colonel on half pay in December 1815. He married into a leading family of the Naples aristocracy in 1807. His daughter, Émile-Dircée Lebon, married Jean-Jacques Flatters in 1830.

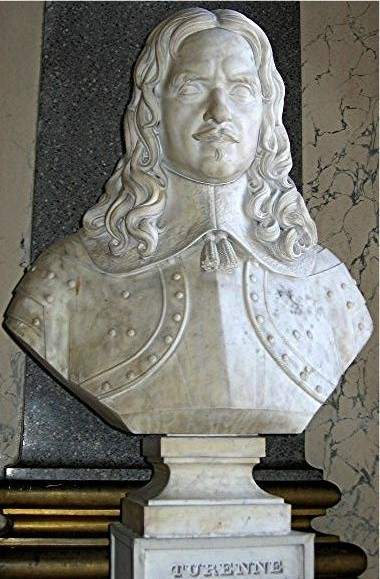
Bust of Turenne by Jean-Jacques Flatters c. 1834

Paul Flatters was born in Paris on 16 September 1832. In 1845, when he was just thirteen, he lost his father. A patron and friend of the family, Baron Isidore Taylor, paid for his education in the Lycée de Laval in Laval, Mayenne. Paul's mother died in 1850. He was admitted to the École spéciale militaire de Saint-Cyr in 1851. Flatters graduated from Saint-Cyr in October 1853, ranked 65th out of 230 students.

== Algerian administration (1853–80) ==
Flatters was made a second lieutenant and posted to Algeria with the 3rd Zouaves. He was appointed lieutenant in 1855. In 1856 he was granted a request to transfer to the Arab Bureaus (bureaux arabes), which had been created by Marshal Thomas Robert Bugeaud to administer the indigenous population. Flatters did not serve in the Crimean War of 1853–56 or the Franco-Austrian War of 1859. In January 1863 he spent three months' leave in Paris. There he met and became engaged to 19-year-old Sara-Marie Le Gros (1845–1933), sister of a former schoolmate at Laval. They married in Paris on 1 May 1864. Their son Étienne Paul Jean Flatters (1868–1950) would become a Brigadier General. Flatters was promoted to captain in 1864. Due to the rough conditions in Algeria his wife could not accompany him when he returned there, so for the next fifteen years they spent time together only when he was on leave or during the short periods when he was stationed in France.

Flatters learned to read classical Arabic and to speak the local vernacular form, and became interested in local history and culture, although his scholarship was always superficial. He published Histoire ancienne du Nord de l'Afrique avant le conquête des Arabes in 1863 for an Arab audience. The book asserted that North Africa was a Berber country to which both Islam and Arabs were alien newcomers. The governor general approved, and ordered the book to be distributed to all the Berbers of the Kabylie. In 1865 he published a revised version of the book for a European readership, Histoire de la géographies et géology de le province de Constantine.

Flatters served in the Franco-Prussian War of 1870, but was taken prisoner almost at once and transferred to Germany. He was in Paris in April–May 1871 when the Paris Commune was suppressed. In 1871 responsibility for administration in the departments of Constantine, Algiers and Oran was transferred to civilians, but the army continued to administer the interior of Algeria. In 1871 Flatters was promoted to major. He was based at Laghouat and worked on administrative tasks.

In 1876 and 1877 Flatters wrote three reports on the caravan trade between the Sudan and the Mediterranean, blaming some of the problems on the Senussi Sufi order and tribe. The reports show that Flatters was fully aware that any European who ventured into the desert without strong protection would almost inevitably be killed. He also observed that the Turks and the merchants of Tripoli, Ghadames, Ghat and Murzuk would be opposed to a Trans-Saharan railway that would divert trade to Algeria. He cast doubt on whether France would benefit from such a railway when the British were supplying much cheaper trade goods.

Locations in Algeria

Writing from Laghouat in the spring of 1877 Flatters noted that the Saharan trade was still mainly one of slaves. Many went to other parts of the Maghreb, but Flatters said that 1,000 were brought to Algeria each year. Due to French abolition of slavery, the merchants in the Sahara would not allow a French presence in the desert. Flatters argued that the French should therefore tolerate and regulate the trade in slaves, which was inevitable, so as to gain access to the interior. In 1879 he published a long article in the Revue historique titled Étude sur l'Afrique septentrionale des origines à l'invasion arabe. On 3 May 1879 he was promoted to lieutenant-colonel and returned to France.

== First expedition (1879–80) ==
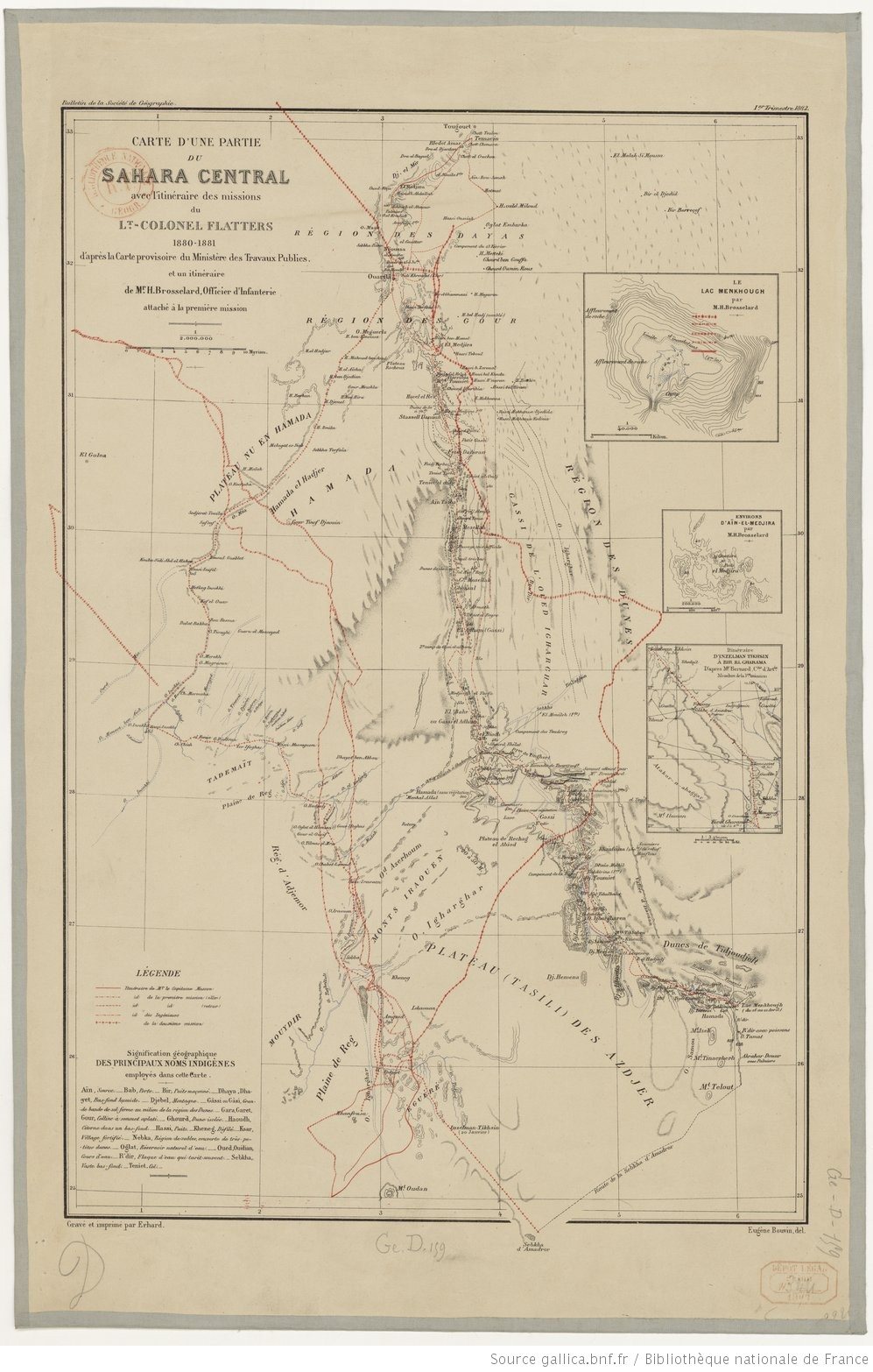
Part of the Central Sahara showing part of the route of the first mission from the draft Ministry of Public Works map and the itinerary of H. Brosselard, member of the 1st expedition

The Trans-Saharan expedition was appointed in 1879 by Charles de Freycinet, Minister of Public Works, to investigate construction of a railway across the Sahara. Three possible routes starting from Oran in the west, Algiers in the center and Constantine in the east were to be examined by three expeditions. The western expedition was led by the engineer Justin Pouyanne. The central one was led by the engineer Auguste Choisy and included Georges Rolland. These two expeditions would complete their work without difficulty. The eastern route was considered the most dangerous, going via the Hoggar Tuareg town of Rhat. Flatters lobbied in Paris to be chosen as leader of this mission. At the age of 48 he was relatively old to lead the expedition. He suffered from sciatica and depended on morphine to relieve his pain, and had unpredictable moods.

Flatters originally proposed a major expedition with more than 200 tirailleurs to provide strong protection, and was supported in this by the military members of the commission. He was opposed by Henri Duveyrier, who had experience of army blundering and was convinced that only small and unobtrusive expeditions whose members adapted to local customs could succeed. The mid-19th century explorer Duveyrier had developed a romantic view of the Tuaregs as peace-loving, honorable people. In fact they were ruthless in dealing with intruders into their land using whatever methods they saw fit. Duveyrier was supported by Ferdinand de Lesseps of Suez Canal fame and other civilian members. A compromise was agreed where the size of the expedition was cut in half, making it a target without adequate means of defense.

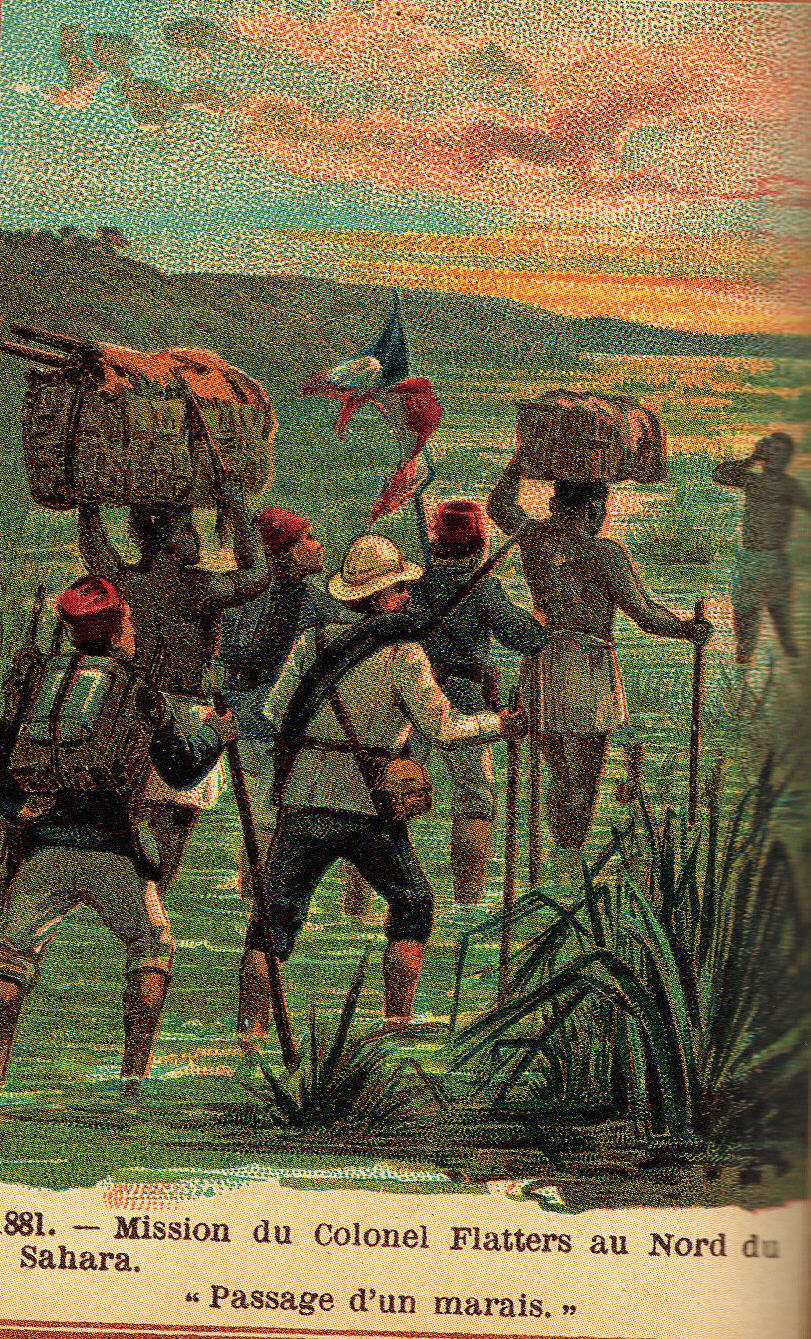
The Flatter expedition crosses a marsh. Chocolats Lombart trading card c. 1900

Flatters returned to Algeria in November 1879, charged with reconnoitering the route that he had himself said was the most favorable for the proposed railway. He left Constantine on 25 January 1880 with 12 Europeans supported by Algerian tirailleurs, cameleers and Chaamba guides. The future Islamologist Alfred Le Châtelier was an assistant topographer. The caravan travelled south to Ouargla. Flatters left from Ouargla on 5 March 1880 with thirty-nine people. They traveled south through the Igharghar valley past Aïn Taïba, El-Bodh and Timassinin. From Timassinin the expedition headed southeast along the Igharghar valley, and on 16 April 1880 encamped on shores of Lake Menghough on the fringe of the Tuareg of the Ajjer country. With provisions running short and the local people showing hostility, Flatters decided to return by the same route.

The French began their retreat northward on the morning of 21 April 1880. Captain Masson was given the rearguard with orders to "die to the last man if need be so the convoy can get away". In fact the Tuareg did little to harass the column. Pressed by Masson, who thought it necessary to save the expedition, on 27 April 1880 Flatters sent a letter to the Amenoukal of the Ahaggar Tuareg in which he promised to return the next winter. The expedition returned intact to Ouargla on 17 May 1880 with valuable information about the country. The valley of the Igharghar river offered a promising route to the Niger River.

== Second expedition (1880–81) ==
=== Advance ===
Flatters quickly returned to Paris to raise support for a second expedition. He received a less enthusiastic reception than with the first expedition, and some of the officers from the first expedition chose not to accompany him on the second attempt. Leaders of the expedition included Flatters, the civil engineers Beringer and Roche, Captain Masson of the artillery corps and Dr. Guiard, all of whom had served on the first expedition. Other members were Lieutenant de Dianous and the civil engineer Santin, who replaced the infantry second lieutenants Le Chatelier and Brosselard of the first expedition. There were also two French staff soldiers, Brame and Marjollet, 47 Algerian tirailleurs, 31 Arab volunteers who were veterans of the French military, seven Chaamba guides and a Muslim mullah of the Tedjini order

The second expedition of 93 men left Ouargla on 4 December 1880 and traveled south by a road west of that taken by the first expedition. It went up the Wadi Mia to Inifel, then along the Wadi Insokki to the Insokki well. From there it went southeast by Messeguem, bypassing the Tademait plateau in Amguid. After three months of travel through the desert the expedition reached Sebka. This is the most southern point reached by the Romans, and the expedition saw the ruins of a monument raised by General Cornelius Balbo in 44 BC. The expedition went on from Sebkha, heading towards Asiou, an important point in the central Sahara from which Flatters hoped to reach the Sudan without difficulty. On 16 February 1881 the expedition stopped at Bir el-Garama about 200 kilometres (120 mi) north of Asiou. The site is near today's city of Tamanrasset.

=== Massacre ===
Before the expedition left Ouargla, plans had been made to destroy it by the Kel Ahaggar Tuaregs of the Hoggar Mountains, the Awlad Sidi Shaykh confederation and the Senussi. They knew the planned route and were kept informed by the expedition's guides, who helped sabotage the expedition by leading it past wells. Six hundred men of the three tribes gathered to ambush the expedition near Bir el-Garama. Tuaregs had been shadowing the expedition for several days when it approached the wells of Bir-el-Gharama. However Flatters considered that Ahitagel ag Muhammad Biska, the Amenukal of the Kel Ahaggar, completely controlled the area and would ensure that no French were harmed in his land.

Near In-Uhawen, or the wells of Tadjenout, Flatters left his baggage in camp with half his troops while he and his officers and scientific staff went to find the well, followed by the camels. Flatters told a guide who warned of danger, "we have nothing to fear". Half an hour after they found the well, Flatters and his men were surrounded by a large force of Tuaregs armed with lances and muzzle-loading muskets. Some men tried to flee on the camels, but the animals refused to leave the well. Flatters, Masson, Beringer, Roche, Guiard and the expedition's commissary Deverny were killed, as were 30 camel drivers. Only ten men escaped. The Tuaregs took almost all of the 250 camels.

=== Retreat ===
The camp was not attacked. Lieutenant de Dianous took command. Without camels the survivors were limited in the amount they could carry. The 56 survivors, including 4 Frenchmen, were well armed against attack but had no transportation and very little water. Traveling by foot the 1,500 kilometres (930 mi) retreat to Ouargla would take 2–3 months. They decided to leave that night after burning most of their supplies and dividing the mission's 102,000 francs among them. They also divided the food and ammunition, and gave the strongest men the skins of water to carry. They struggled back, suffering from hunger and thirst. The Tuareg picked off beasts of burden and stragglers.

By 22 February 1881 the survivors were almost out of food, and a few days later were eating grass. They straggled on, with the strongest going ahead in the hope of finding game. When they had lost all hope, a group of Tuaregs approached and offered to sell them milk, meat and dates at a high price. The dates turned out to be poisoned with a substance that caused dizziness and psychosis. This came from the plant called Falezlez by the Tuaregs (Hyoscyamus muticus, or Egyptian henbane). The effect was to induce a burning sensation in the victims' lungs, and to cause them to rush about madly and fire off their guns. Many of the sharpshooters and Chaamba had avoided the dates and were able to restore calm, and the poisoned men recovered after vomiting. Some of the party escaped during this incident. The retreat continued the next day.

The wells at Amguid were guarded by a strong force of Tuaregs who were driven away after a fight in which de Dianous, Santin, Brame, Marjolet and 12 tirailleurs were killed. The only remaining Frenchman was the commissary Pobéguin. The survivors broke up into small groups, each suspicious that the others were hoarding. On 23 March 1881 an Algerian tirailleur in Pobéguin's group was shot. Several men built a large fire and cooked his corpse which they offered to Pobéguin, but he refused to eat it. With all discipline gone more victims were shot and eaten, and Pobéguin eventually joined in. He himself was killed and eaten by the end of March. Four tirailleurs reached Ouargla on 2 April 1881, and three others were picked up on the road. On 4 April 1881 the last survivors arrived at Messeguem. Towards the end of April about a dozen exhausted survivors reached Ouargla.

== Aftermath ==
The first response when the news reached France was shock, followed by calls to punish the Ahaggar Tuareg and make greater efforts to colonize the Sahara. However, interest soon faded and the tragedy was forgotten. Some of the newspapers held Duveyrier partly to blame for the disaster with his opposition to military force and utterly inaccurate depiction of the "vicious, cruel and barbaric" Tuareg. Duveyrier tried to vindicate his approach by two solo expeditions into the Rif mountains in Morocco. He became increasingly disturbed by guilt and anger, and took his own life on 24 April 1892. The disaster caused plans for a railway to be abandoned. From some of the letters written by Flatters before the disaster it was possible to assemble some information on the country the expedition had travelled through. For several decades this was the main source of information on the central Sahara. There is a marble column with a bronze plaque commemorating the Flatters Expedition in the Parc Montsouris in the 14th arrondissement of Paris. Another memorial was erected in Ouargla.

== Publications ==
Publications by Paul Flatters include:

- Paul François Xavier Flatters (1863), Histoire ancienne du Nord de l'Afrique avant le conquête des Arabes
- Paul François Xavier Flatters (1865), Histoire de la géographies et géology de le province de Constantine
- Paul François Xavier Flatters (1879), "Étude sur l'Afrique septentrionale des origines à l'invasion arabe", Revue historique
- P. Flatters (1879), "L'Afrique septentrionale ancienne", Revue africaine, Algiers: A. Jourdan: 91
- Paul François Xavier Flatters (1880), Chemin de fer transsaharien. Mission Flatters, février-mai 1880 ("Extrait de la carte provisoire au 1/1 250 000" (région au sud d'Ouargla); "Copie du registre des observations astronomiques et des comparaisons barométriques" (23 p. multigraphiées); "Détermination des longitudes et latitudes et comparaisons des baromètres" (36 p. multigraphiées); journal de route de la mission Flatters (4 pièces multigraphiées))
- P. F.-X. Flatters; F.-X. Béringer; Roche; Lucien Rabourdin; Dr Bonnet (1884), Documents relatifs à la mission dirigée au sud de l'Algérie (Journal de route. Rapports des membres de la mission. Correspondance), Paris: Impr. nationale / France. Ministère des travaux publics, p. 443
- Paul Flatters (1942), "Journal et correspondance", Les pionniers du Méditerranée-Niger, vol. 1 (4 ed.), Paris: Mercure de France, p. 181

== Sources ==
- Asher, Michael (2011-12-15), Sands of Death: An Epic Tale Of Massacre And Survival In The Sahara, Orion, ISBN 978-1-78022-254-7
- Brower, Benjamin Claude (2011), A Desert Named Peace: The Violence of France's Empire in the Algerian Sahara, 1844–1902, Columbia University Press, ISBN 978-0-231-15493-2
- Garric, Alain, "Paul FLATTERS", geneanet (in French)
- Grandjean, Charles, "Flatters", Imago Mundi (in French)
- Heffernan, Michael (November 1989), "The Limits of Utopia: Henri Duveyrier and the Exploration of the Sahara in the Nineteenth Century", The Geographical Journal, 155 (3), geographicalj: 342–352, Bibcode:1989GeogJ.155..342H, doi:10.2307/635209, JSTOR 635209
- Ney, Napoleon (1891), "The Proposed Trans-Saharian Railway", Scribner's Magazine, Charles Scribner's Sons
- Pastoureau, Mireille (2008), Le duel fatal Harry Alis - Alfred Le Chatelier, 1er mars 1895, un épisode d'histoire littéraire et coloniale (PDF) (in French), Bibliothèque de l’Institut de France
- Porch, Douglas (2005-06-22), The Conquest of the Sahara: A History, Farrar, Straus and Giroux, ISBN 978-1-4299-2209-8
- Strachan, John (2011), "Murder in the Desert: Soldiers, Settlers and the Flatters Expedition in the Politics and Historical Memory of European Colonial Algeria, 1830–1881" (PDF), French History and Civilization Papers from the George Rudé Seminar, 4: 2010 Seminar
