= Cheikh Bouamama =

Algerian leader (1841-1908)

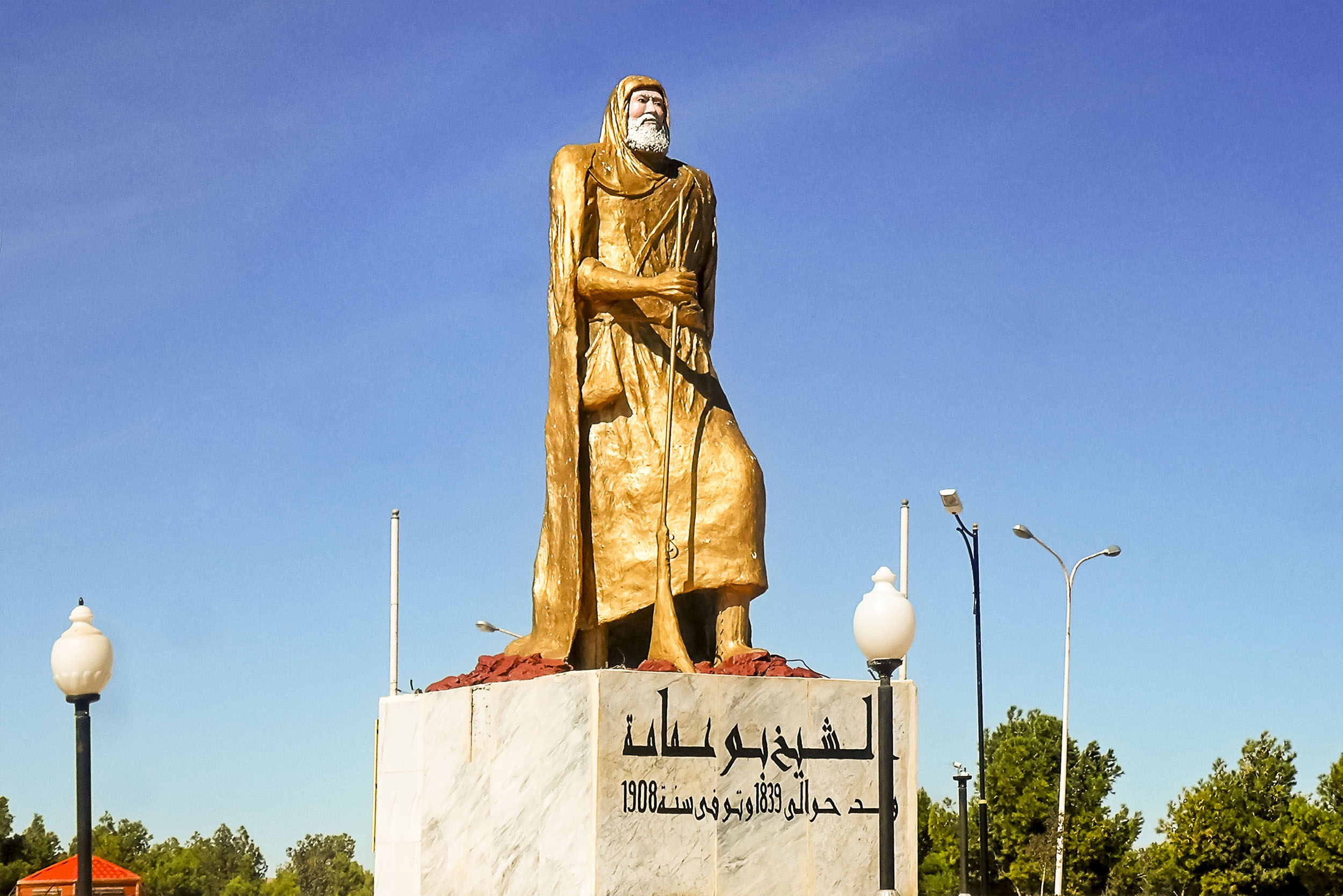
- Born: 1841; Figuig
- Died: October 7, 1908 (aged 66–67)
- Known for: Leader of the tribe Awlad Sidi Shaykh

Cheikh Bouamama or Shaykh Bu 'Amamah Al Bousheikhi Al Bakri (Arabic: الشيخ بوعمامة, romanized: Shaykh Bū ʿAmāma) led a popular resistance against French occupation in Algeria from 1881 to 1908.

Cheikh Bouamama was a leader of the tribe Awlad Sidi Shaykh. The resistance that he led in the southwest of Algeria from 1881 to 1908.

The Algerian filmmaker Benamar Bakhti made the 1983 film L'Épopée de Cheikh Bouamama ("The Epic of Cheikh Bouamama").

== See also ==
- Invasion of Algiers in 1830
- Abdelkader al-Jazairi
- Sherif Boubaghla
- Mokrani Revolt
- Algerian War
- Massacre of Saïda (1881)
