= Massacre of Saïda (1881) =

Massacre of Spanish immigrant workers

Khalfallah massacre
- Part of Mokrani Revolt
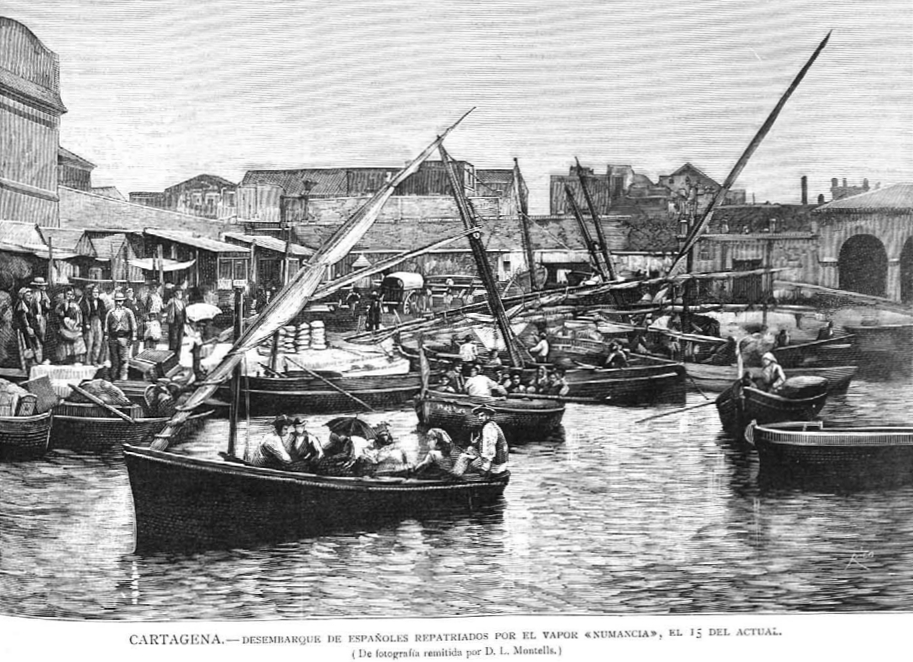
- Disembarkation of repatriated Spaniards in the port of Cartagena (published in July 1881 in La Ilustración Española y Americana).
- Location: Khalfallah, Saïda, French Algeria
- Date: 11 June 1881
- Target: Spanish immigrant workers
- Attack type: Massacre
- Deaths: ~190
- Perpetrator: Insurgents led by Bou-Amama
- Motive: Resistance against French occupation

Around 190 immigrants of Spanish origin, most of them day labourers working in the esparto harvest, were killed on 11 June 1881 in French Algeria (in the countryside around Saïda) by members of the insurgent movement led by Bou-Amama. (Note: The massacre has been both referred as "Massacre de Khalfallah" in French (Vilar Ramírez 1983, p. 279) or as "matanza de Saida" (Montes Bernárdez 2011, p. 129; Pérez Artés 2016, p. 16) in Spanish.)

== Development ==
The Franco-Algerian Company hired day labourers across the impoverished Spanish South-East to work in the esparto harvest in Algeria offering passage and travel to their families, although eventually day labourers were forced to pay for their travel and to buy their food at the company's store.

Following the outbreak of a rebellion in Tunisia, the instability moved to Algeria in late April 1881, with Bou-Amama taking the lead of the movement against the French occupation. Then, on 11 June 1881, following the seizure of Khalfallah by insurgents, around 190 Spanish esparto harvesters (most of them from Almería, and the rest from Murcia and Alicante) were put to the sword in Khalfallah, in the surroundings of Saïda (to the south of Oran), whereas many of their wives were raped, while the attackers also made 600 hostages and set 100,000 quintals of esparto on fire.

News about the event arrived in Oran (17 June) and then in Spain (18 June). For the rest of June and July many naked and hungry Spaniards moved to Oran to get a passage back to Almería. About 10,000 immigrants were repatriated to Spain.

== Bibliography ==
Notes

Citations

Bibliography

- Moisand, Jeanne (2015). "Migrant-e-s entre deux empires. Journaliers agricoles espagnols à Cuba et en Algérie dans les années 1880-1890". Revue d'histoire du XIXe siècle. 51 (51): 89–106. doi:10.4000/rh19.4925.
- Montes Bernárdez, Ricardo (2011). "La matanza de almerienses, murcianos y alicantinos en Khalfalah (Saida, Argelia), en 1881" (PDF). Murgetana (124). Murcia: Real Academia Alfonso X el Sabio: 119–132. ISSN 0213-0939.
- Pérez Artés, María del Carmen (2016). "El éxodo almeriense: entendiendo la emigración española finisecular" (PDF). Documentos de Trabajo. Asociación Española de Historia Económica. ISSN 2174-4912. Archived from the original (PDF) on 2021-09-21.
- Vilar Ramírez, Juan Bautista (1983). "Quelques conséquences en Espagne du soulèvement Algérien de 1881 (dans les courants migratoires hispano-algériens et dans relations hispano-françaises)" (PDF). Mélanges de la Casa de Velázquez. 19. Madrid: Casa de Velázquez: 275–291. doi:10.3406/casa.1983.2396. ISSN 2173-1306.
