= Jean-Jacques Flatters =

French sculptor (1786–1845)

- Born: Johann Jakob Flatters; 6 November 1786; Krefeld, Westphalia
- Died: 19 August 1845 (aged 58); Paris, France
- Occupation: Sculptor

Jean-Jacques Flatters, (6 November 1786 – 19 August 1845) was a French neo-classical sculptor. He was the father of Lieutenant-colonel Paul Flatters, who led a tragic mission in the Sahara in 1881.

== Life ==
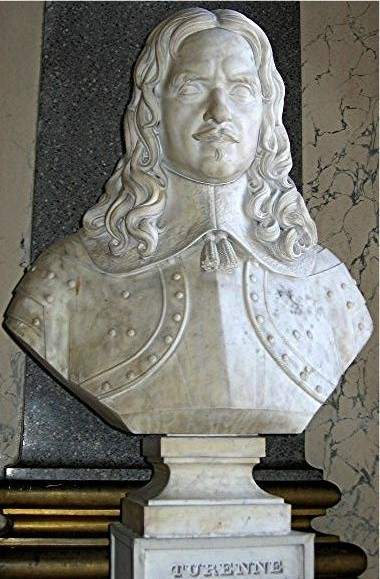
Bust of Turenne by Jean-Jacques Flatters c. 1834

Jean Jacques Flatters was born on 6 November 1786 in Krefeld, Westphalia. He came from Westphalia to Paris to study sculpture and painting. He was a pupil of Jean-Antoine Houdon (1741–1828) and Jacques-Louis David (1748–1825). Flatters began exhibiting at the Salon of 1810. On 25 September 1813, he won the second prize for sculpture in the Prix de Rome. Jean-Jacques Flatters served in the French army from February to July 1814 at the close of the First French Empire.

During the Bourbon Restoration, Flatters earned a living by making busts of famous people such as Goethe and Byron. He received only three official commissions before 1830: a bust in 1819 and two more busts in 1829. A letter of 9 November 1830 has survived that Flatters wrote to the Count of Montalivet, Minister of the Interior. In it he states that the Minister Perronnet [sic] had promised him the job of creating a marble statue of Saint Louis, while the sculptor James Pradier would make one of Charlemagne, but now both jobs had been given to Pradier. Flatters described the many difficulties he had experienced in his career and appealed to the minister to give him justice. On 4 September 1831, Flatters was given compensation of 5,000 francs for loss of the commission.

In 1830, Flatters married Emile-Dircée Lebon, daughter of the Napoleonic colonel Simon Lebon. Their son was Paul Flatters (1832–81), the future explorer. Jean Jacques Flatters died on 19 August 1845 in Paris, aged 58. A patron and friend of the family, Baron Isidore Taylor, paid for his son's education in the Lycée de Laval in Laval, Mayenne.

== Works ==
Statues made by Flatters include Hebe, Ganymede, Erigone, Satan (inspired by Milton and exhibited at the Salon of 1827) and Jacques Delille at Clermont-Ferrand. He made many busts including the writers and artists Byron, Goethe, Grétry and Talma; the actresses Mlle George and Mlle Raucourt; the famous contemporaries Foy, Manuel, Laffitte, and Louis XVIII (presented at the Salon of 1814); the historical figures Robert of Burgundy, Turenne and Piero Strozzi, Marshal of France.

== Sources ==
- Garric, Alain, "Jean Jacques FLATTERS", geneanet (in French)
- Porch, Douglas (2005-06-22), The Conquest of the Sahara: A History, Farrar, Straus and Giroux, ISBN 978-1-4299-2209-8
- Poulet, Anne L. (2005), Jean-Antoine Houdon: Sculptor of the Enlightenment, University of Chicago Press, ISBN 978-0-226-67649-4
- Siler, Douglas (1984), Correspondance (in French), Librairie Droz, ISBN 978-2-600-03603-0
