= Saïda, Algeria =

Saïda سعيدة
- City
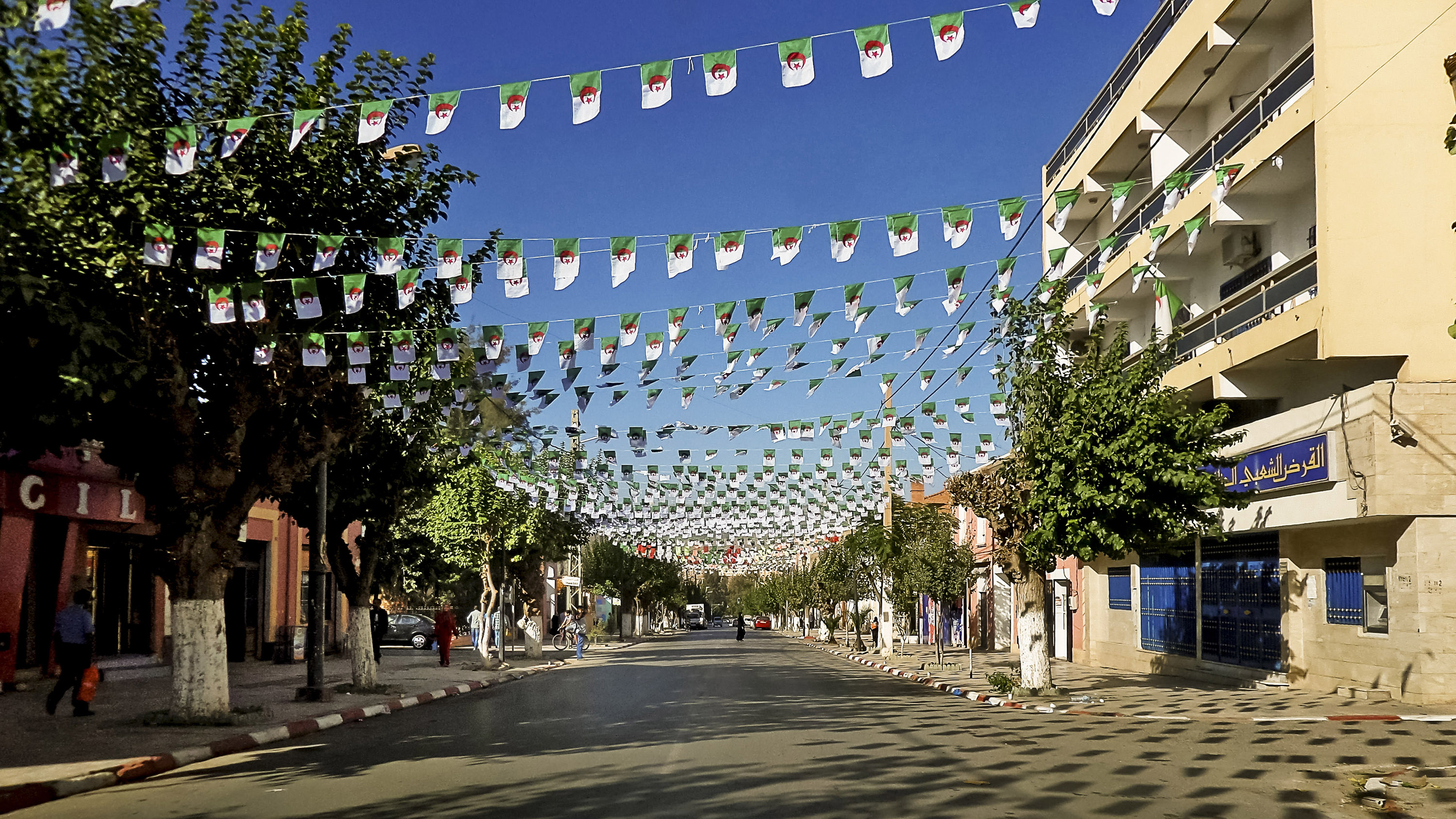
- Saïda
- Motto: "From the people, for the people"
- Location of Saïda in Saïda Province

- Location of Saïda in Algeria
- Coordinates: 34.833333°N 0.15°E
- Country: Algeria
- Province: Saïda Province
- District: Saïda District

Government
  - Type: Municipality

Area
  - Total: 75.62 km^{2} (29.20 sq mi)
- Elevation: 980 m (3,220 ft)

Population (2008 census)
  - Total: 142,497
  - Density: 1,884/km^{2} (4,881/sq mi)
- Time zone: UTC+1 (CET)
- Postal code: 20000
- ISO 3166 code: CP

Saïda (Arabic: سعيدة, saʿīda, pronounced [saʕiːda]) is a commune and the capital city of Saïda Province, Algeria.

== History ==
The city's site has been of military importance ever since the Romans built a fort there. Saïda was a stronghold of Abd al-Qadir, the Algerian national leader, who burned the town as French forces approached it in 1844.

Modern Saïda was founded as a French military outpost in 1854 and once housed a regiment of the French Foreign Legion. Its growth was stimulated by the arrival of the Oran-Béchar (narrow-gauge) railway in 1862.

In 2005 the population was 158,856 inhabitants. It is nicknamed the city of waters, because of its abundant underground springs. The area is forested and the main products of the town are cereals, wool, leather and bottled mineral waters.

== Geography ==
=== Location ===
Saïda is located in north-western Algeria, on the southern slopes of the Tell Atlas mountain range at the northern fringe of the High Plateaus. The city lies on the right bank of the Wadi Saïda, protected by wooded mountains on the opposite shore that rise steeply from the valley floor to an elevation of some 4,000 feet (1,200 metres).

=== Climate ===
Climate data for Saïda (1991–2020)
Month	Jan	Feb	Mar	Apr	May	Jun	Jul	Aug	Sep	Oct	Nov	Dec	Year
Record high °C (°F)	25.6 (78.1)	28.6 (83.5)	32.6 (90.7)	39.5 (103.1)	42.2 (108.0)	42.9 (109.2)	44.2 (111.6)	43.7 (110.7)	41.3 (106.3)	37.5 (99.5)	31.1 (88.0)	27.5 (81.5)	44.2 (111.6)
Mean daily maximum °C (°F)	14.1 (57.4)	15.2 (59.4)	18.4 (65.1)	21.4 (70.5)	26.4 (79.5)	32.1 (89.8)	36.6 (97.9)	36.1 (97.0)	30.3 (86.5)	25.1 (77.2)	18.2 (64.8)	15.0 (59.0)	24.1 (75.4)
Daily mean °C (°F)	8.5 (47.3)	9.3 (48.7)	11.9 (53.4)	14.2 (57.6)	18.5 (65.3)	23.4 (74.1)	27.6 (81.7)	27.5 (81.5)	22.8 (73.0)	18.4 (65.1)	12.7 (54.9)	9.7 (49.5)	17.0 (62.6)
Mean daily minimum °C (°F)	2.9 (37.2)	3.3 (37.9)	5.4 (41.7)	7.0 (44.6)	10.5 (50.9)	14.7 (58.5)	18.7 (65.7)	19.0 (66.2)	15.2 (59.4)	11.8 (53.2)	7.1 (44.8)	4.4 (39.9)	10.0 (50.0)
Record low °C (°F)	−9.3 (15.3)	−6.2 (20.8)	−5.8 (21.6)	−3.5 (25.7)	−0.6 (30.9)	5.4 (41.7)	8.4 (47.1)	7.0 (44.6)	6.6 (43.9)	2.0 (35.6)	−2.4 (27.7)	−11.0 (12.2)	−11.0 (12.2)
Average precipitation mm (inches)	42.9 (1.69)	36.5 (1.44)	43.0 (1.69)	38.7 (1.52)	30.1 (1.19)	12.1 (0.48)	6.0 (0.24)	10.8 (0.43)	25.7 (1.01)	43.0 (1.69)	44.4 (1.75)	36.7 (1.44)	369.9 (14.56)
Average precipitation days (≥ 1.0 mm)	7.1	6.3	6.1	5.7	4.7	2.1	1.1	1.6	3.7	4.8	6.4	6.4	56.0
Mean monthly sunshine hours	193.4	197.9	233.6	260.4	296.1	327.6	334.9	310.9	261.1	244.7	194.9	183.0	3,038.5
Source: NOAA

== Transport ==
Saïda is served by a narrow gauge railway from Mohammadia; however, a standard gauge line is proposed.

== Demographics ==
Saïda had a population of 110,865 in 1998, while the population grew to 124,989 in 2008, representing a 12.74% increase.

== Gallery ==
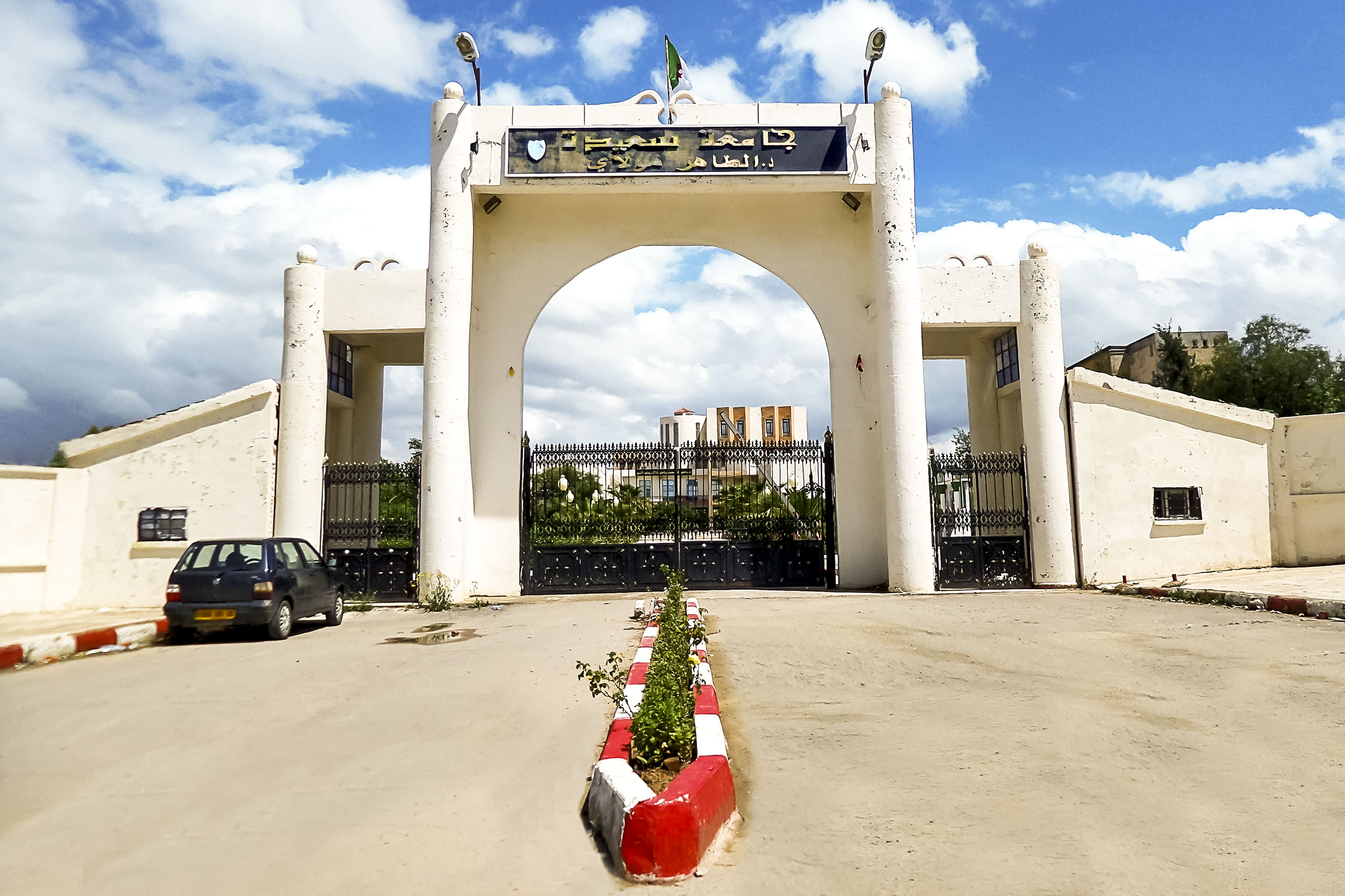

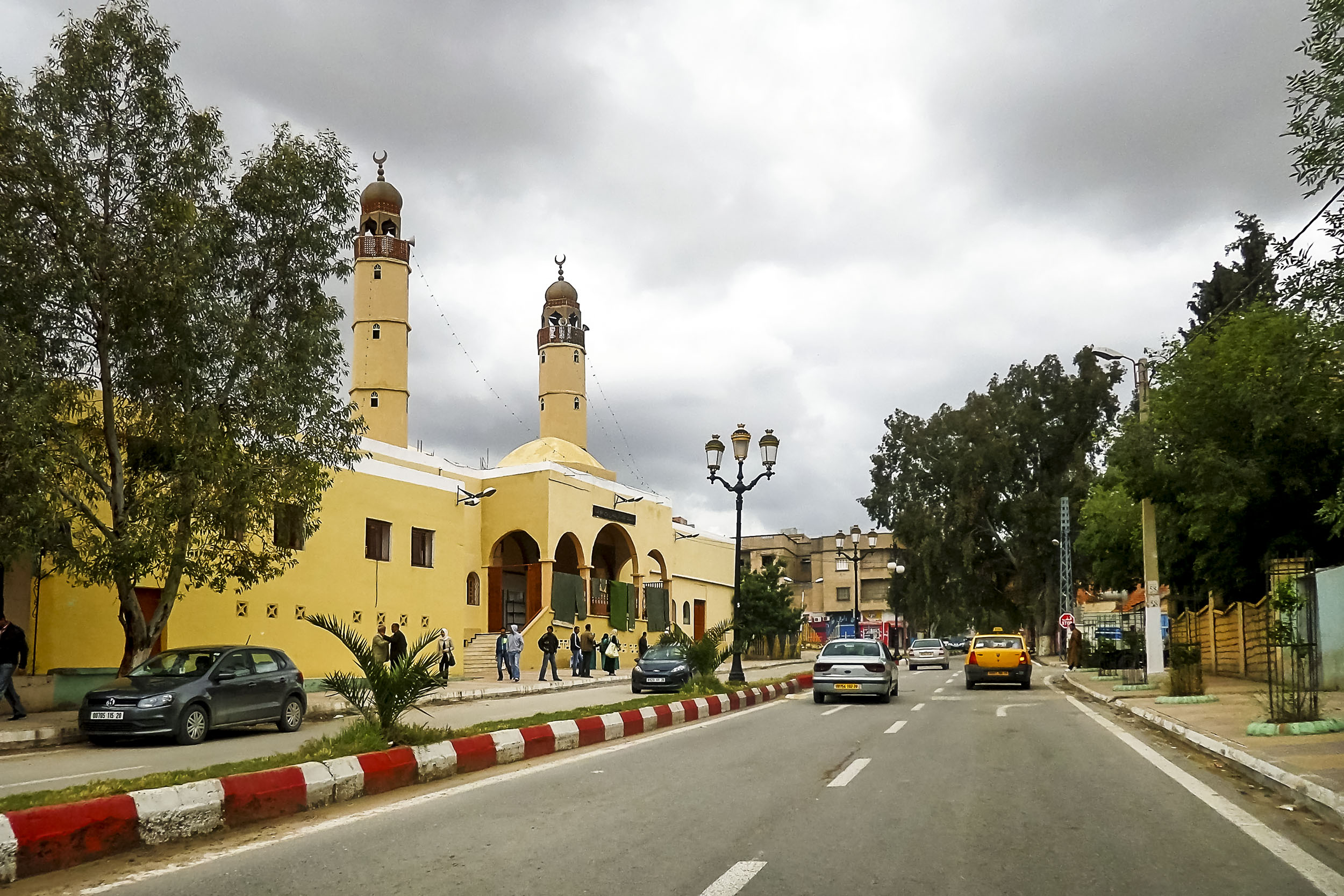

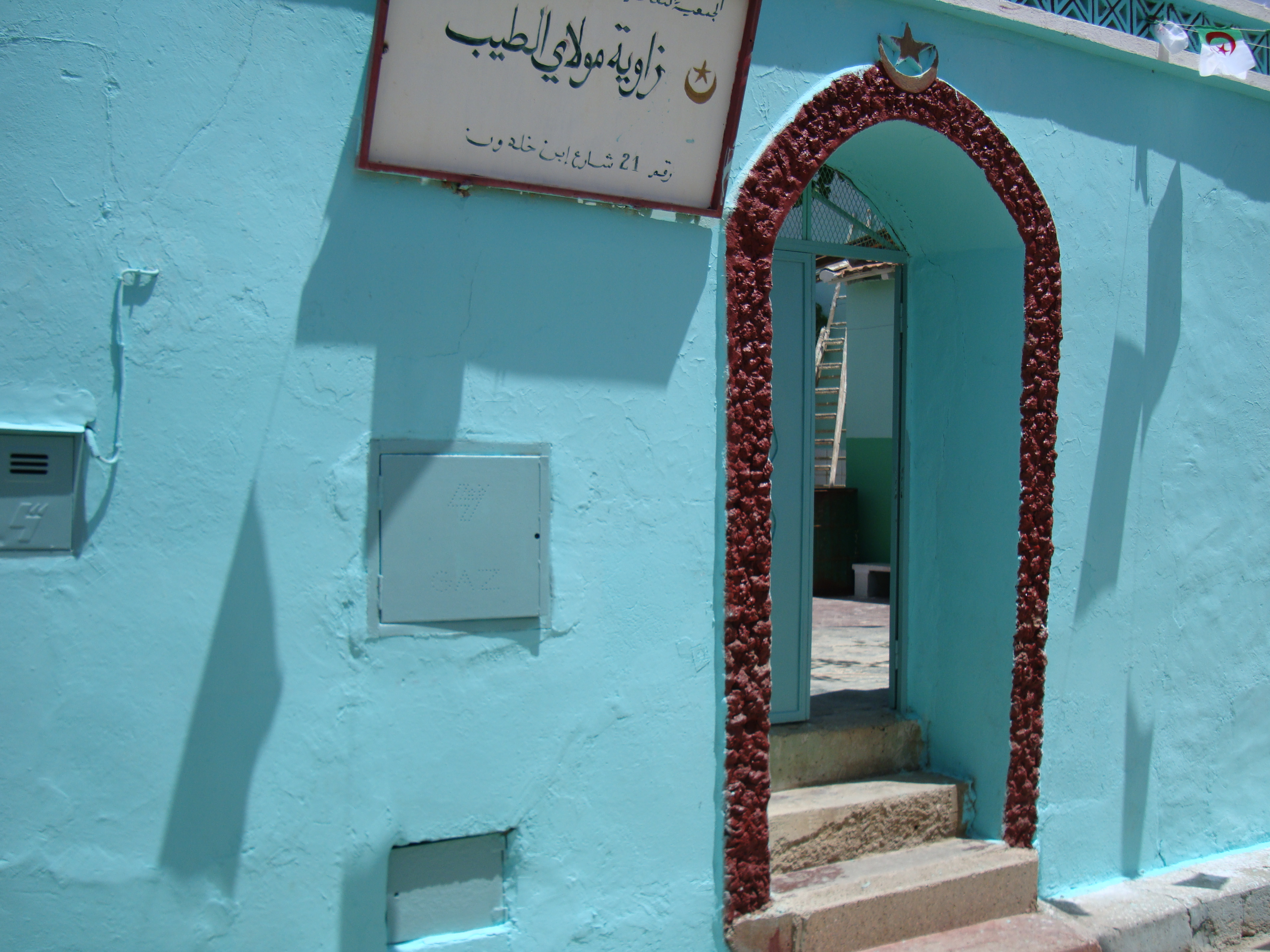

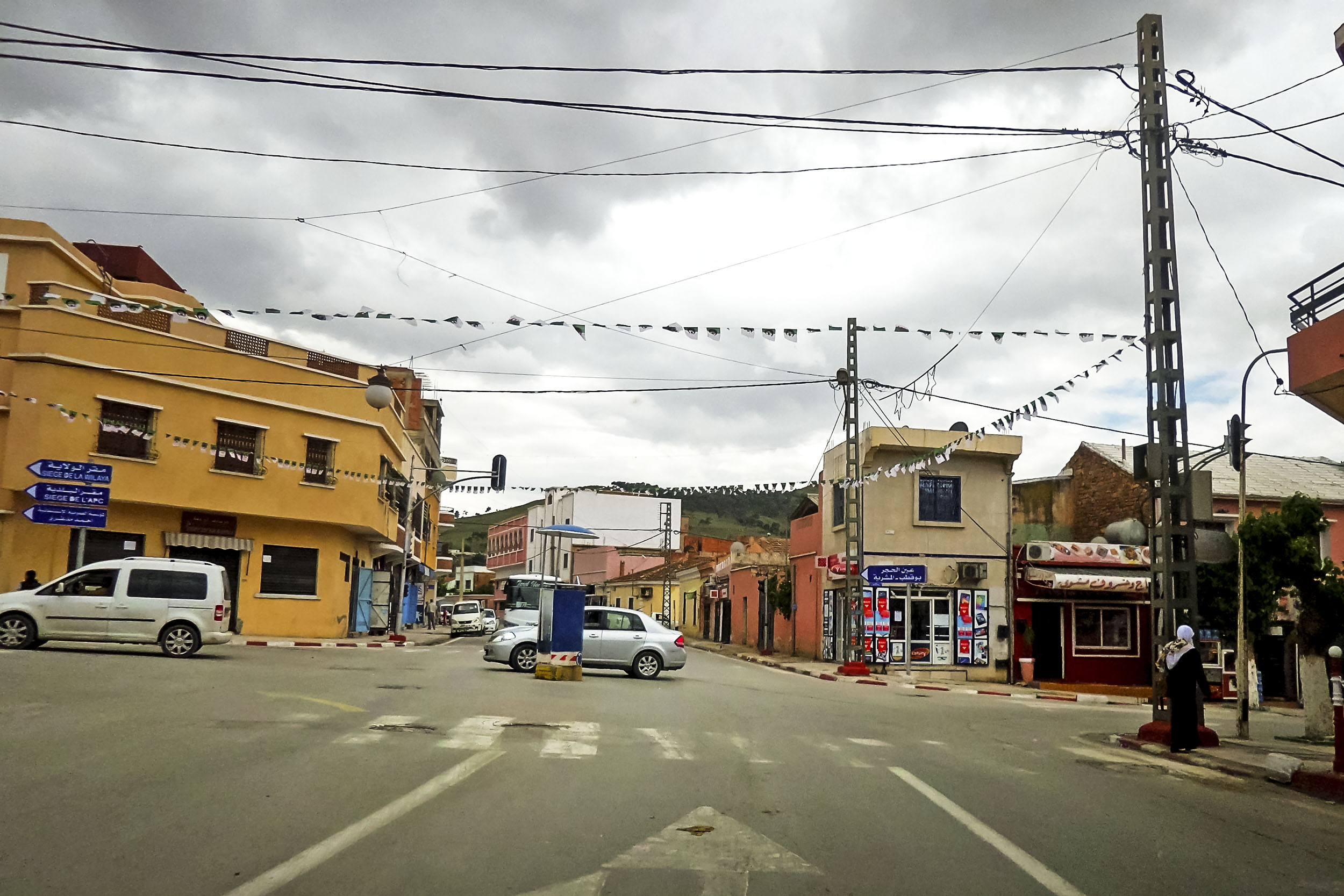

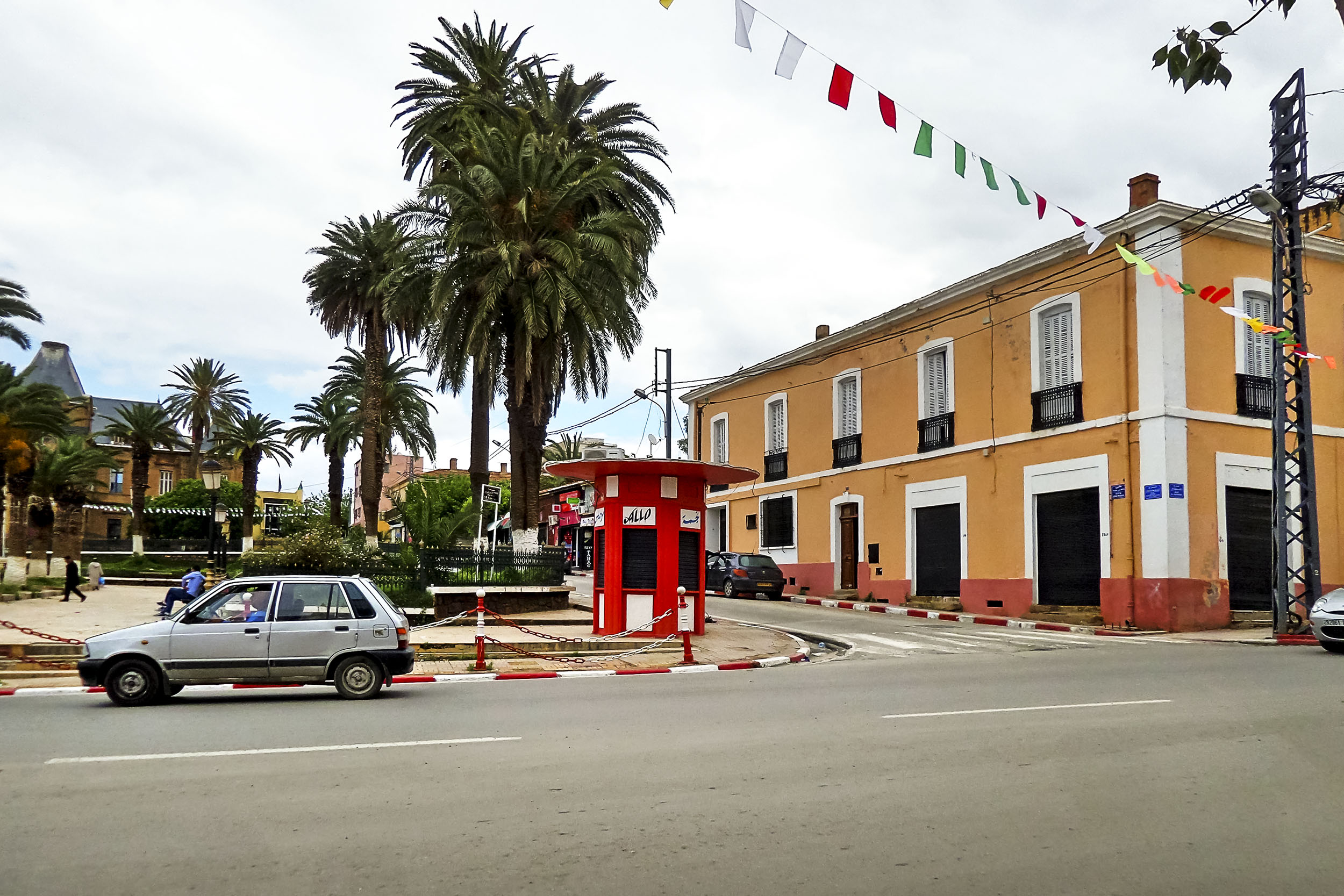

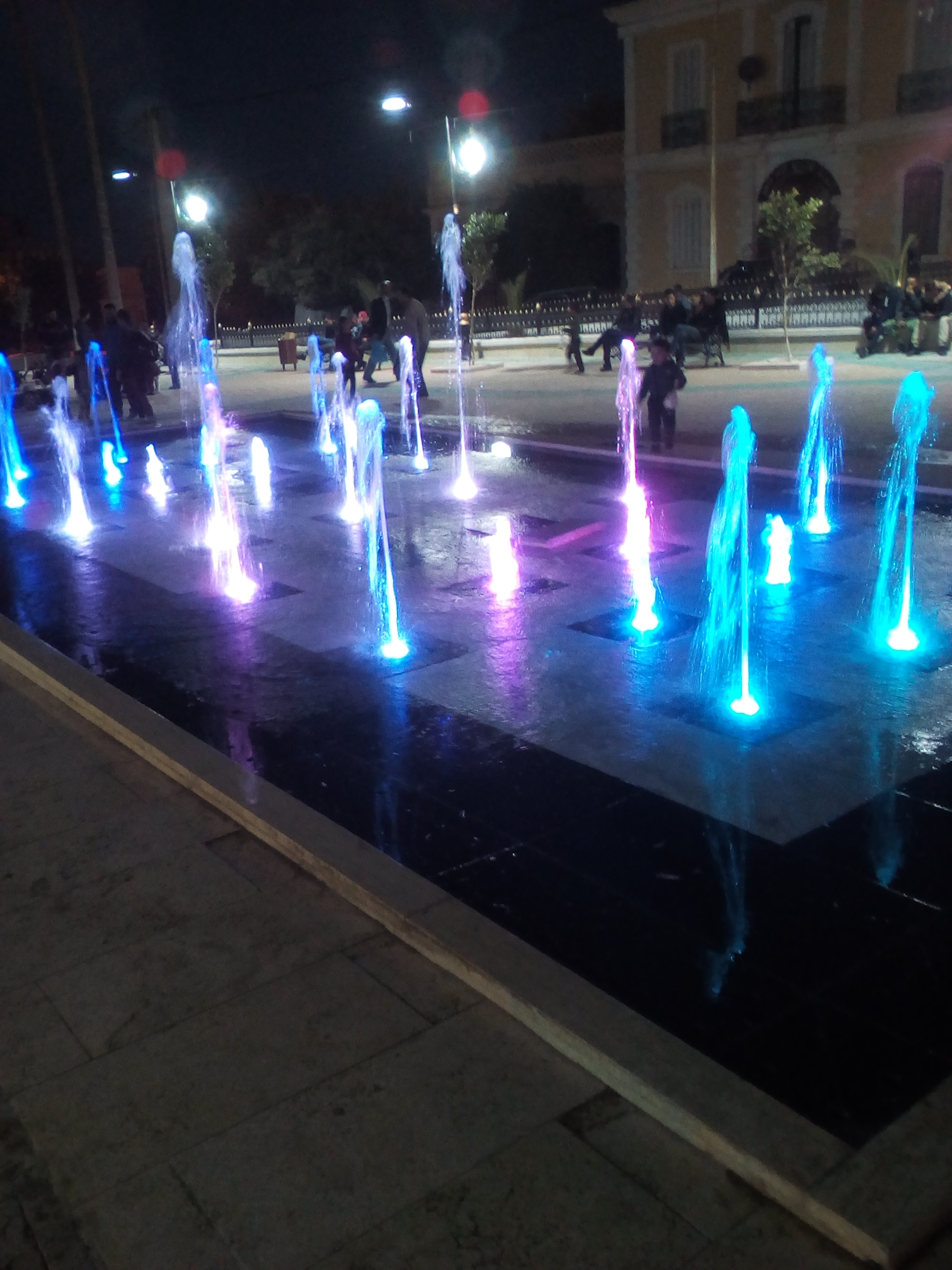

== See also ==
- Railway stations in Algeria
- Massacre of Saïda (1881)
