= Bir el-Garama =

- Well
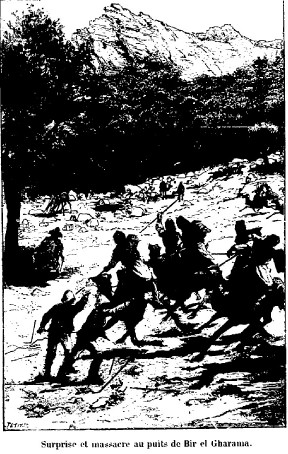
- The 1881 massacre at Bir el-Garama

- Location within Algeria
- Coordinates: 23.2667°N 6.85°E
- Country: Algeria
- Province: Tamanrasset
- Elevation: 1,102 m (3,615 ft)

Bir el-Garama is a well in the south of Algeria in Tamanrasset Province, 150 kilometres (93 mi) northeast of Tamanrasset, known as the site where a large part of the French colonial Flatters Expedition was wiped out by Tuaregs. It is better known on French maps by its Tamahaq language name: Tagmout T-an Koufar, or 'well of the foreigners'.

== Location ==
Bir el-Garama is also known as Tagmout, Taguienout or Tadjenout, but the latter are common Tuareg place names used all over their territory. It is about 1,177 metres (3,862 ft) above sea level. The Arabic name means "well of the Garamentes". It is close to the course of the Oued Ti-n-Tarabine which peters out into the desert near the Niger border close to the old border post of I-n- Azaoua.

== Flatters expedition ==
In 1881 Paul Flatters led an expedition south to survey a route for a trans-Saharan railway. Before the expedition left Ouargla plans had been made to destroy it by the Kel Ahaggar Tuaregs of the Hoggar Mountains, the Awlad Sidi Shaykh confederation and the Senussi. They knew the planned route and were kept informed by the expedition guides, who helped sabotage the expedition by leading it past wells. It is said six hundred men of the three tribes gathered to ambush the expedition near Bir el-Garama. Tuaregs had been shadowing the expedition for several days when it approached the wells of Bir-el-Gharama. However Flatters considered that Ahitagel ag Muhammad Biska, the Amenukal of the Kel Ahaggar, completely controlled the area and would ensure that no French were harmed in his land.

Near In-Uhawen, or the wells of Tadjenout, Flatters left his baggage in camp with half his troops while he and his officers and scientific staff went to find the well, followed by the camels. Flatters told a guide who warned of danger, "we have nothing to fear". Half an hour after they found the well, Flatters and his men were surrounded by a large force of Tuaregs armed with lances and muzzle-loading muskets. Some men tried to flee on the camels, but the animals refused to leave the well. Flatters, Masson, Beringer, Roche, Guiard and the expedition's commissary Deverny were killed, as were 30 camel drivers. Only ten men escaped. The Tuaregs took almost all of the 250 camels.

== Sources ==
- Brower, Benjamin Claude (2011), A Desert Named Peace: The Violence of France's Empire in the Algerian Sahara, 1844–1902, Columbia University Press, ISBN 978-0-231-15493-2
- Grandjean, Charles, "Flatters", Imago Mundi (in French)
- Hennebert, Lieutenant-colonel (1890), "Le Soudan Français", Le correspondant (in French), Bureaux du Correspondant
- National Geospatial-Intelligence Agency, "Bir el Garama: Algeria", Geographic.org, Bethesda
- Ney, Napoleon (1891), "The Proposed Trans-Saharian Railway", Scribner's Magazine, Charles Scribner's Sons
- "Taguienout", geonames
- "Taguienout", geoview.info
